= List of Sydney light rail stops =

The Sydney light rail system has four lines. The system is owned by the Government of New South Wales. The first three lines are operated under contract by Transdev Sydney, while the L4 Westmead & Carlingford Line is operated by Great River City Light Rail, a joint venture between Transdev and CAF.

The first light rail line in Sydney is the Inner West Light Rail, operated under the name L1 Dulwich Hill Line. This line is mostly within the corridor of a closed heavy rail goods line, with a small section running along streets in the Sydney central business district (CBD). This line has 12.7 kilometres (7.9 mi) of track and twenty-three stops. The first section, ten stops between Central station and Wentworth Park via Darling Harbour and Pyrmont, opened on 11 August 1997. A four-stop extension from Wentworth Park to Lilyfield opened on 13 August 2000, and a nine stop extension from Lilyfield to Dulwich Hill opened on 27 March 2014.

The second and third light rail lines opened as part of the CBD and South East Light Rail, which has nineteen stops in total and consists of two branches that combine within the CBD. The L2 Randwick Line branch has four unique stops and the L3 Kingsford Line branch has five unique stops. The L2 Randwick Line opened on 14 December 2019 with fourteen new stops, and the five remaining stops opened on 3 April 2020, when the L3 Kingsford Line began.

On 20 December 2024, stage one of the Parramatta Light Rail opened under the name L4 Westmead & Carlingford Line. This stage has sixteen stops over 12 kilometres (7 mi) of track. Stage two is expected to begin construction in 2025, with fourteen additional stops over 10 kilometres (6 mi) of track.

== List of current stops ==
List of current stops
Stop	Image	Served by	Location	Opened	Transfers
Arlington	Light rail stop	Dulwich Hill Line	Dulwich Hill	27 March 2014	
Bank Street	Light rail stop in a trench	Dulwich Hill Line	Pyrmont	11 August 1997	
Benaud Oval	Light rail stop in the middle of a street	Parramatta Light Rail	North Parramatta	20 December 2024	
Bridge Street	Light rail stop on the street	CBD and South East Light Rail	Sydney CBD	14 December 2019	
Capitol Square	Tram at a light rail stop on the street	Dulwich Hill Line	Haymarket	11 August 1997	Light rail at Chinatown
Carlingford	Tram at a light rail stop	Parramatta Light Rail	Carlingford	20 December 2024	
Central Chalmers Street	Tram at a modern light rail stop at night	CBD and South East Light Rail	Haymarket / Surry Hills	14 December 2019	Sydney Trains; Sydney Metro; Light rail at Central Grand Concourse
Central Grand Concourse	Tram at a light rail stop outside a heritage railway station	Dulwich Hill Line	Haymarket	11 August 1997	Sydney Trains; Sydney Metro; Light rail at Central Chalmers Street
Childrens Hospital	Light rail stop in the middle of a street	Parramatta Light Rail	Westmead	20 December 2024	
Chinatown	Tram at a light rail stop on the street	CBD and South East Light Rail	Haymarket	14 December 2019	Light rail at Capitol Square
Church Street	Light rail stop under construction	Parramatta Light Rail	Parramatta	20 December 2024	
Circular Quay	Light rail stop on the street	CBD and South East Light Rail	Sydney CBD	14 December 2019	Sydney Trains; Sydney Ferries
Convention	Light rail stop	Dulwich Hill Line	Sydney CBD	11 August 1997	
Dulwich Grove	Tram at a light rail stop	Dulwich Hill Line	Dulwich Hill	27 March 2014	
Dulwich Hill	Tram at a light rail stop	Dulwich Hill Line	Dulwich Hill	27 March 2014	
Dundas	Light rail stop	Parramatta Light Rail	Dundas	20 December 2024	
ES Marks	Light rail stop on the street	CBD and South East Light Rail	Kensington	3 April 2020	
Exhibition Centre	Light rail stop	Dulwich Hill Line	Sydney CBD	11 August 1997	
Fennell Street	Light rail stop	Parramatta Light Rail	Parramatta	20 December 2024	
Glebe	Light rail stop	Dulwich Hill Line	Glebe	13 August 2000	
Hawthorne	Light rail stop	Dulwich Hill Line	Leichhardt	27 March 2014	
Haymarket	Tram at a light rail stop on the street	CBD and South East Light Rail	Haymarket	14 December 2019	
John Street Square	Light rail stop in a large trench	Dulwich Hill Line	Pyrmont	11 August 1997	
Jubilee Park	Light rail stop	Dulwich Hill Line	Glebe	13 August 2000	
Juniors Kingsford	Light rail stop on the street	CBD and South East Light Rail	Kingsford	3 April 2020	
Kensington	Light rail stop on the street	CBD and South East Light Rail	Kensington	3 April 2020	
Kingsford	Light rail stop on the street	CBD and South East Light Rail	Kingsford	3 April 2020	
Leichhardt North	Light rail stop	Dulwich Hill Line	Lilyfield	27 March 2014	
Lewisham West	Light rail stop	Dulwich Hill Line	Lewisham	27 March 2014	
Lilyfield	Light rail stop viewed from a bridge	Dulwich Hill Line	Lilyfield	13 August 2000	
Marion	Light rail stop on an embankment	Dulwich Hill Line	Leichhardt	27 March 2014	
Moore Park	Light rail stop	CBD and South East Light Rail	Moore Park	14 December 2019	
Ngara	Light rail stop	Parramatta Light Rail	North Parramatta	20 December 2024	
Paddy's Markets	Tram at a light rail stop on the street	Dulwich Hill Line	Haymarket	11 August 1997	
Parramatta Square	Light rail stop	Parramatta Light Rail	Parramatta	20 December 2024	Sydney Trains; Sydney Ferries
Prince Alfred Square	Light rail stop	Parramatta Light Rail	Parramatta	20 December 2024	
Pyrmont Bay	Underground light rail stop	Dulwich Hill Line	Pyrmont	11 August 1997	
QVB	Light rail stop on the street	CBD and South East Light Rail	Sydney CBD	14 December 2019	
Randwick	Light rail stop on the street	CBD and South East Light Rail	Randwick	14 December 2019	
Robin Thomas	Light rail stop	Parramatta Light Rail	Parramatta	20 December 2024	
Rosehill Gardens	Light rail stop	Parramatta Light Rail	Camellia	20 December 2024	
Royal Randwick	Light rail stop	CBD and South East Light Rail	Centennial Park / Randwick	14 December 2019	
Rozelle Bay	Light rail stop	Dulwich Hill Line	Annandale	13 August 2000	
Surry Hills	Light rail stop on the street	CBD and South East Light Rail	Surry Hills	14 December 2019	
Taverners Hill	Light rail stop	Dulwich Hill Line	Leichhardt	27 March 2014	
Telopea	Light rail stop	Parramatta Light Rail	Telopea	20 December 2024	
The Star	Underground light rail stop	Dulwich Hill Line	Pyrmont	11 August 1997	
Town Hall	Light rail stop on the street	CBD and South East Light Rail	Sydney CBD	14 December 2019	
Tramway Avenue	Light rail stop	Parramatta Light Rail	Parramatta	20 December 2024	
UNSW Anzac Parade	Light rail stop on the street	CBD and South East Light Rail	Kensington	3 April 2020	
UNSW High Street	Light rail stop on the street	CBD and South East Light Rail	Randwick	14 December 2019	
Wansey Road	Light rail stop on the street	CBD and South East Light Rail	Randwick	14 December 2019	
Waratah Mills	Light rail stop	Dulwich Hill Line	Dulwich Hill	27 March 2014	
Wentworth Park	Light rail stop	Dulwich Hill Line	Pyrmont	11 August 1997	
Westmead	Light rail terminus stop	Parramatta Light Rail	Westmead	20 December 2024	Sydney Trains
Westmead Hospital	Light rail stop in the middle of a street	Parramatta Light Rail	Westmead	20 December 2024	
Wynyard	Light rail stop on the street	CBD and South East Light Rail	Sydney CBD	14 December 2019	
Yallamundi	Light rail stop	Parramatta Light Rail	Rydalmere	20 December 2024	
