= Camellia railway station =

Former railway station in Sydney, Australia

Camellia
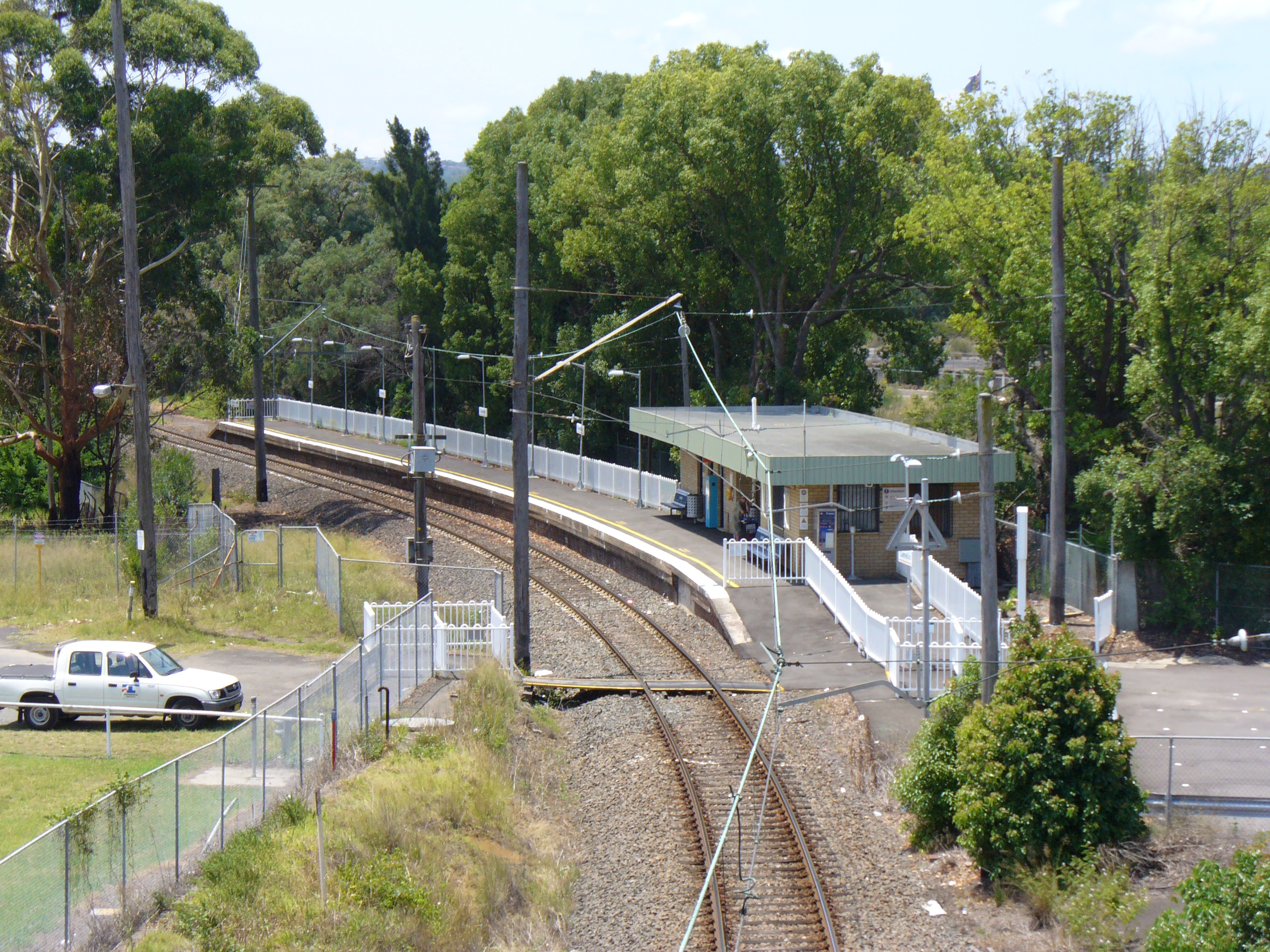
- Northbound view of station platform in December 2006

General information
- Location: Grand Avenue North, Camellia; Sydney, New South Wales; Australia
- Coordinates: 33°49′06″S 151°01′28″E
- Owner: Transport Asset Manager of New South Wales
- Operator: Sydney Trains
- Line: Carlingford
- Distance: 22.95 km (14.26 mi) from Central
- Platforms: 1 (1 side)
- Tracks: 1

Construction
- Structure type: Ground

Other information
- Status: Demolished
- Station code: CEL
- Website: Transport for NSW

History
- Opened: 1 August 1901 (125 years ago)
- Closed: 5 January 2020 (6 years ago)
- Former names: Subiaco (1901)

Passengers
- 2018: 140 (daily) (Sydney Trains, NSW TrainLink)

Former services
Preceding station	Sydney Trains	Following station
Rydalmere towards Carlingford	Carlingford Line (1885–2020)	Rosehill towards Clyde
Location

Camellia railway station was a suburban railway station located on the Carlingford line, serving the Sydney suburb of Camellia. Open between 1901 and 2020, at the time of closure it was served by Sydney Trains T6 Carlingford Line services.

== History ==
The private Simpson's Railway from Rosehill Racecourse to Carlingford was constructed through the site of the future Camellia station in 1896. However, no station was provided at Camellia at this time. The private railway line was purchased by the NSW State Government in July 1899, with a view to provide passenger services along the line.

The site of the future Camellia station was located at the perpendicular flat crossing of the railway line and the Parramatta Steam Tramway to Redbank Wharf, which had opened in 1883. The idea to provide an interchange between the two railways meant that construction of a station at the site was proposed as early as January 1899 before the government's purchase of Simpson's Railway, though by as late as 18 July 1901, no decision had yet been publicly reported on the construction of said station.

However by 27 July, a station platform had been constructed at to ensure an interchange between the two services. The station was provisionally labelled as the "Parramatta platform" of the line, due to its intended role to provide service for travellers coming from Parramatta by tram. The station had previously appeared under the name Parramatta Tram Junction in proposed timetables from 1900.

Camellia station opened on 1 August 1901 as Subiaco, named after a local estate which housed a convent of Benedictine nuns. The station was renamed Camellia on 14 September 1901, due to public confusion as Subiaco railway station was located on the southern bank of the Parramatta River, with the Subiaco estate on the northern side closer to Victoria Road railway station. The new name was devised from a local nursery called Camellia Grove.

As per its original intention, Camellia station served as an interchange between the Carlingford railway line and steam tram services, until the latter ceased operations in March 1943.

By 2014, Camellia was the least patronised station on the Sydney Trains network, with 70 boardings per day being recorded.

The section of the Carlingford railway line north of Camellia was converted to light rail as part of the Parramatta Light Rail project with Carlingford line services ceasing on 5 January 2020, after which Camellia station closed permanently. The station and surrounding area were fully demolished in May 2020. The area immediately north of Camellia station is the branching point for the lines to Carlingford and the future line to Sydney Olympic Park. Rosehill Gardens light rail station is also located north of the site of Camellia station.

== Former services ==
=== Platforms ===
At the time of closure, Camellia had the following services:

Platform	Line	Stopping pattern	Notes
1	T6	services to Carlingford services to Clyde	

=== Transport links ===
Camellia station was served by one NightRide route:

- N61: Carlingford station to Town Hall station
