= Carlingford railway line =

Defunct railway line in Sydney, New South Wales, Australia

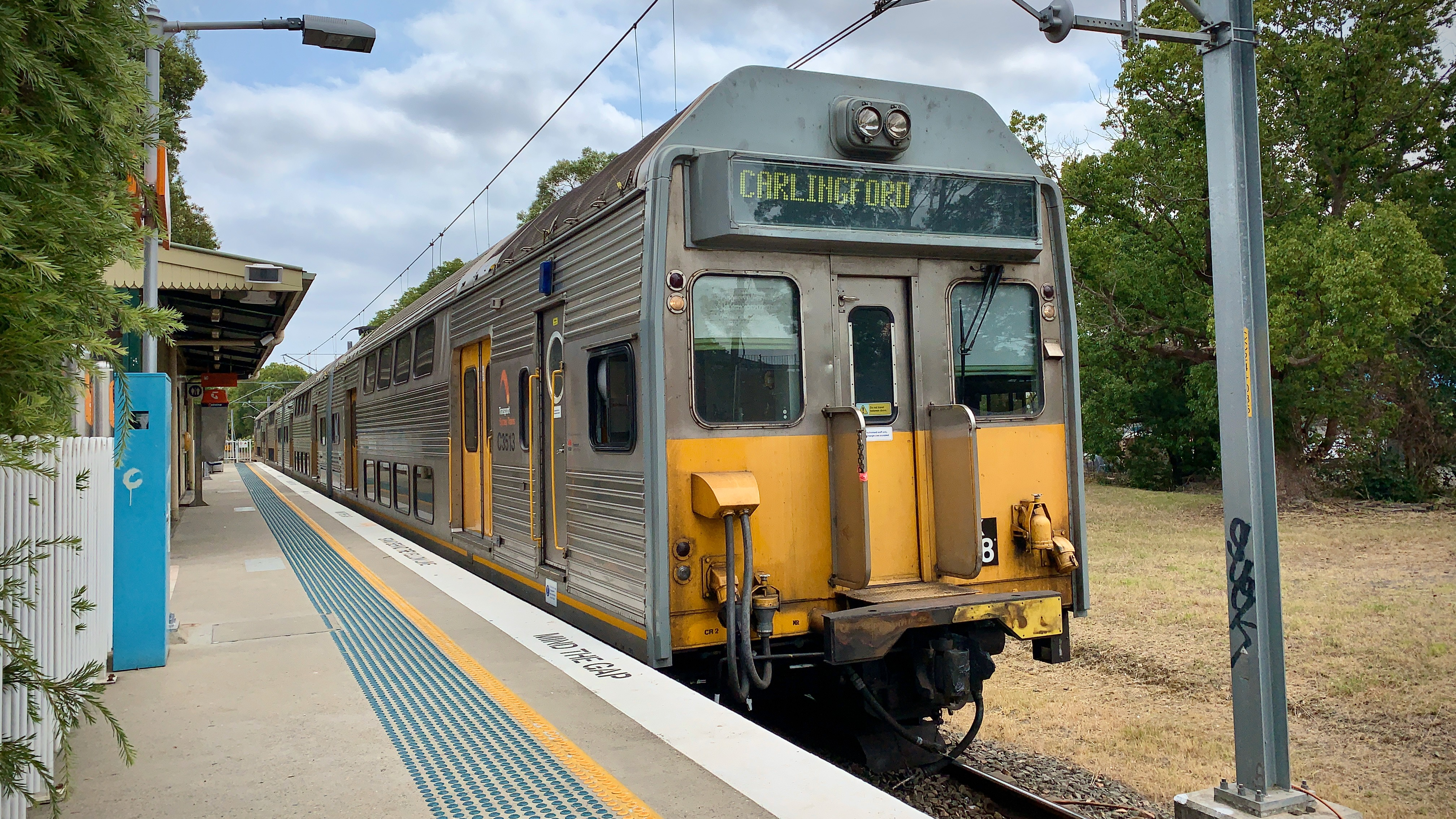
- A K set at Rydalmere station in December 2019, during the final days of heavy rail operation

Overview
- Status: Converted to light rail
- Owner: RailCorp (2004–2019)
- Locale: Sydney, New South Wales, Australia
- Termini: Clyde; Carlingford
- Stations: 7

Service
- Services: T6 Carlingford Line
- Operator: Sydney Trains
- Ridership: 569,000 (2018/19)

History
- Opened: 17 January 1888 to Rosehill Racecourse
- Extended to Carlingford: 20 April 1896
- Electrified to Rosehill: 12 December 1936
- Electrified to Carlingford: 9 August 1959
- Closed: 5 January 2020

Technical
- Line length: 7.19 km (4.47 mi)
- Track gauge: 1,435 mm (4 ft 8 1/2 in) standard gauge
- Electrification: 1,500 V DC overhead catenary

The Carlingford railway line is a former heavy rail line in Sydney, New South Wales, Australia. It was opened from Clyde to Rosehill Racecourse (later renamed Rosehill) in January 1888, then by means of the construction of a bridge across the Parramatta River, to Carlingford in April 1896. It closed on 5 January 2020 with most of the line converted to be part of Parramatta Light Rail which opened in December 2024. A short section of the line was retained for use by Sydney Trains.

== Line description ==
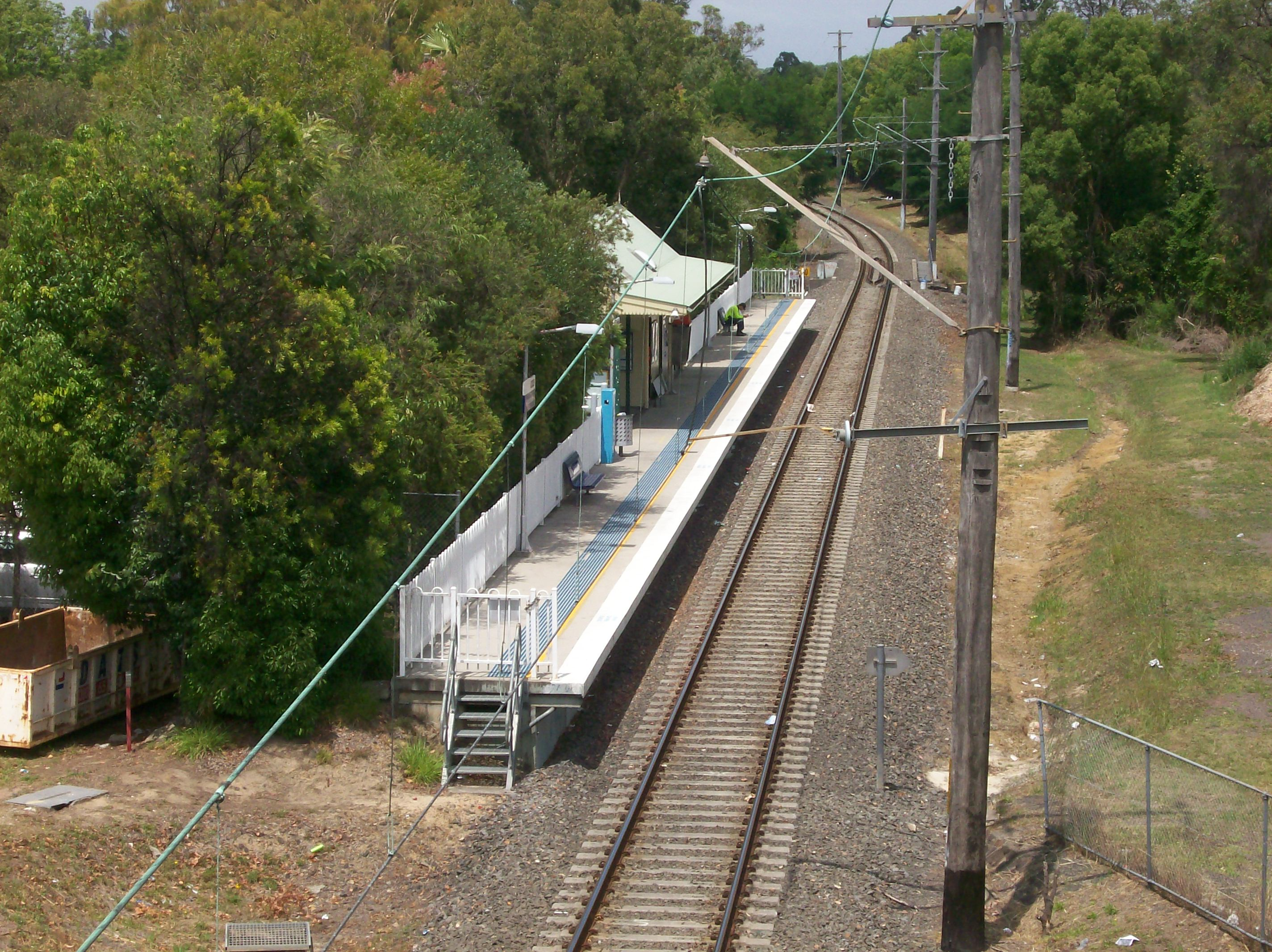
The railway line viewed from Rydalmere station

The Carlingford line branched off the Western line at Clyde heading north and crossing Parramatta Road via a level crossing, before passing under the M4 Western Motorway to Rosehill station. It was a double track line to this point.

Immediately south of Rosehill, the two tracks joined, before dividing into two bi-directional tracks, the Sandown line and the Carlingford line. Rosehill station had two platforms; one four-car long platform on the Carlingford line and one platform which was approximately sixteen-cars long on the Sandown line track which was used for special events at Rosehill Gardens Racecourse.

Originally these operated as conventional platforms; the shorter platform being served by northbound services and the longer one by southbound services with the double track merging into a single track to the north of the station. However, on race days, the shorter platform would be served by services in both directions to allow for the section immediately north of the station on the southbound track to stable race day trains. In June 1992, the junction was moved to south of Rosehill station with the shorter platform served by Carlingford line services in both directions and the longer platform only by race day trains and Sandown line services.

The line then headed in a north-easterly direction over the Parramatta River to Carlingford. The stations from Camellia to Carlingford consisted of a single platform of a sufficient length to accommodate four-carriage trains. There were no crossing loops or any further sections of double track on the line, and thus no capacity for trains to pass each other.

There were no signals past Rosehill, meaning the entire section of line was one block, meaning only one train could be in this section at any time. Trains entering or exiting this block were detected using an axle counter. The section between Rosehill and Clyde was controlled using conventional track circuits and signals.

=== Stations ===
Former T6 interactive map

Name	Distance from Central	Opened	Railway line	Suburbs served	Other lines
Clyde - Carlingford
Clyde	20.66 km	1882	Main Suburban	Clyde, Granville	T1 North Shore & Western Line T2 Leppington & Inner West Line
Rosehill	22.42 km	1888	Carlingford	Rosehill	
Camellia	22.95 km	1901	Carlingford	Camellia	
Rydalmere	24.01 km	1896	Carlingford	Rydalmere	
Dundas	24.84 km	1896	Carlingford	Dundas	
Telopea	26.34 km	1925	Carlingford	Telopea	
Carlingford	27.85 km	1896	Carlingford	Carlingford	

=== Sidings ===
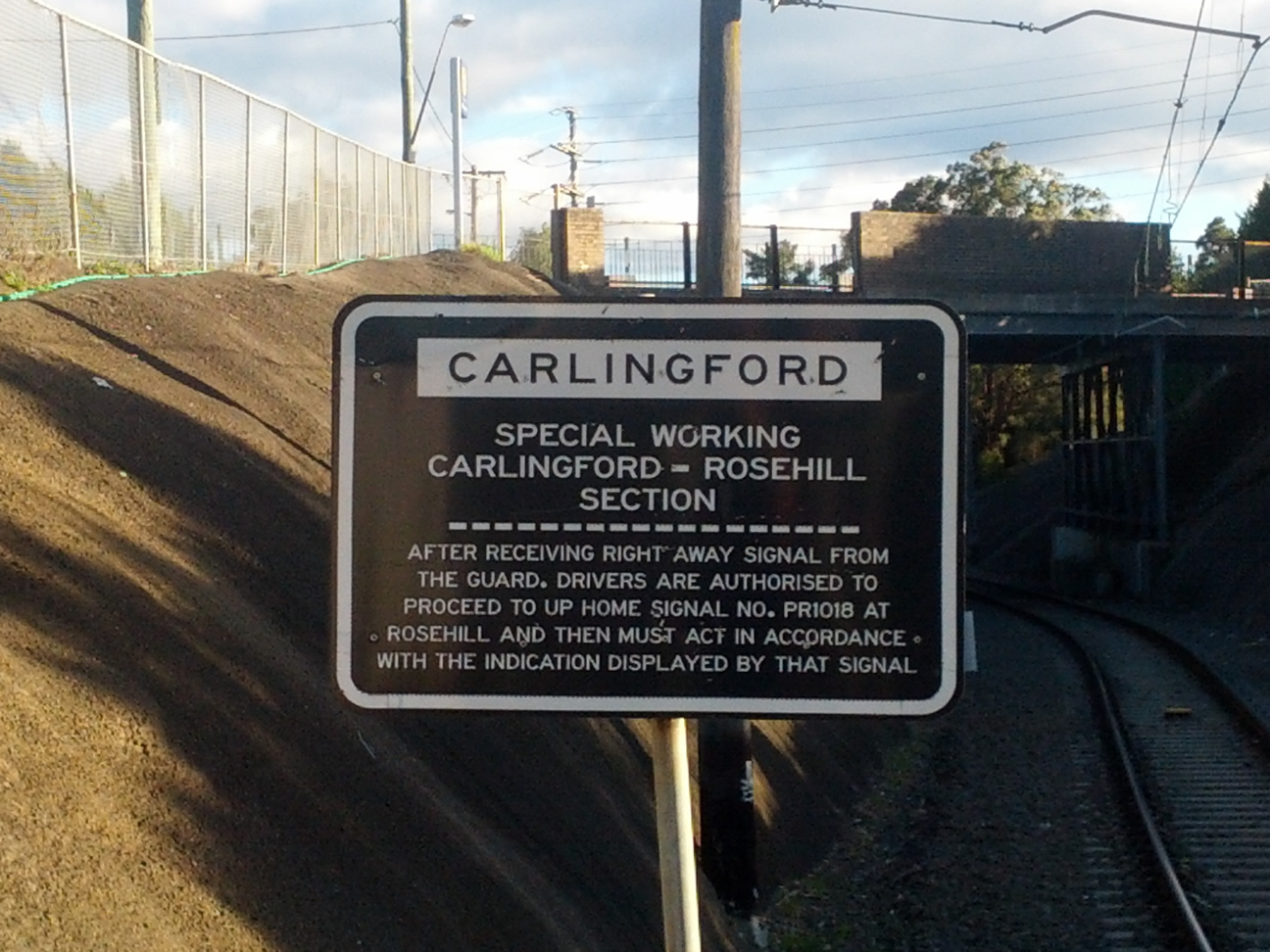
Sign giving permission for terminating trains to proceed from Carlingford, as there are no signals past Rosehill.

A number of industrial and car storage sidings have been built on the line.

Starting from the Clyde end:

- Prestressed Concrete Siding: located between Clyde station and the Parramatta Road crossing. Served the railways prestressed concrete manufacturing plant which no longer operates. Currently used to stable an automated track recording vehicle. The junction is on the branch down line with the points facing north (down).
- Shell Refinery Siding: located between A'Beckett Creek and Rosehill station. The siding and junctions points have been removed. Junction was on the branch up line with the points facing south (up).
- Rheem Siding and Loop: located at Rydalmere station. Served the Rheem factory. The siding consisted of a short loop line with junctions north and south of the original Rydalmere station and a siding branch into the factory itself at the southern end of the yard. The loop, factory branch and all junctions have been removed. The new Rydalmere station is now situated on the opposite side of the branch line from the original station and occupies the site of the former loop.
- Electricity Commission Siding: located at the southern end of Carlingford station. The siding was built to move large electrical transformers into the Carlingford Electrical sub-station, one of the major substations distributing electric power to Sydney. The siding and junction points have been removed. The junction was on the run-around loop with the points facing north.
- Carlingford Produce Siding and Loop: a locomotive run-around loop alongside Carlingford station and a siding serving the Carlingford Produce store. The produce store siding joined the run-around loop at the southern end of the station with the points facing south. The loop and siding, together with all their junctions, have been removed.
- Carlingford Car Storage Sidings: a two track siding north of Carlingford station connected to both the branch line and the locomotive run-around loop. The sidings and junctions have been removed.

== History ==
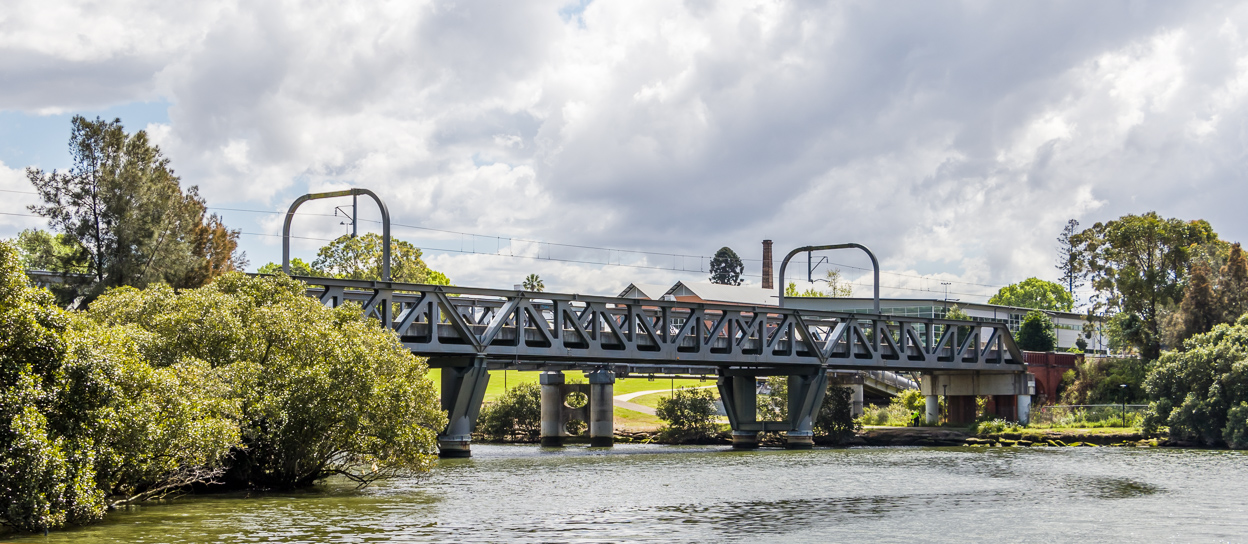
Bridge over the Parramatta River

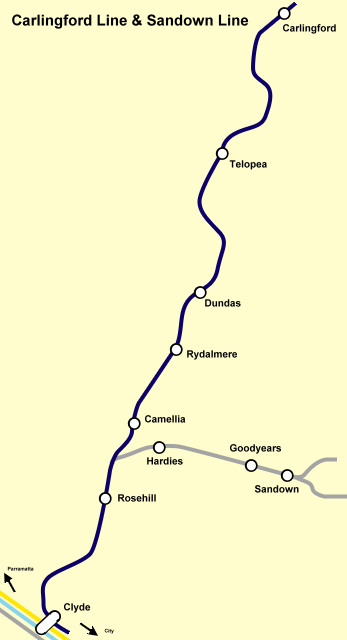
The Carlingford and Sandown lines

The first sod for the future Carlingford railway line was turned on 12 November 1886. The line was opened in two sections: Clyde to Rosehill was opened on 17 January 1888, and Rosehill to Carlingford (then known as Pennant Hills) was opened on 20 April 1896. Camellia station was added in 1901 and Telopea station was added in 1925. Originally the line was privately owned by two companies: the line from Clyde to Rosehill was owned by John Bennett and the line from Rosehill to Carlingford was owned by the Rosehill Railway Company. The lines were taken over by their bank in 1896, with the Government purchasing the line in 1898 and recommencing services on 1 August 1901. The line was duplicated to just south of Camellia station on 19 June 1902.

The line from Clyde to Rosehill was electrified on 12 December 1936. The electrification was extended to Carlingford on 9 August 1959. Passenger services to Sandown ceased on 19 December 1991.

In 1996, the original iron lattice bridge over the Parramatta River was replaced. The new bridge only has one track, although it was built to allow a second track to be laid in the future. It sits on the refurbished piers of the original bridge.

In early 2007, the pedestrian crossings at Telopea and Dundas stations were rebuilt. The new automatic crossings provide audible and visual warnings of an approaching train and a short time later close the metal gates.

Over the week of 20 to 26 October 2007, the section of track from Telopea to Carlingford was completely replaced, utilising concrete sleepers instead of timber ones. The section from Telopea to Rosehill was similarly upgraded over the fortnight of 22 June to 3 July 2009. The railway remains on timber sleepers from Rosehill to Clyde.

The line was colour-coded orange in CityRail promotional material until 1991 when it was coded yellow (along with the Western Line). From 2000 until closure, it was colour-coded dark blue.

Until June 2010, the line carried oil trains to and from the Clyde Refinery on the Sandown line. In October 2016, Sandown line traffic was officially suspended. A Stop Block was placed on the Sydney side of Access Road level crossing.

== Modification proposals ==
The line's low frequency and low level of patronage led to various inquiries and studies into its future. A major problem was the level crossing over Parramatta Road, which held up traffic when trains travelled across it. Proposals included tunnel links to Clyde or Granville stations, or replacing the line altogether with a more frequent light rail or busway service.

The New South Wales Government originally planned for the Carlingford line to be part of Stage 2 of the Parramatta Rail Link. That plan would have incorporated the majority of the line, with the section between Carlingford and Camellia duplicated. Telopea, Dundas, and Rydalmere stations would also have been duplicated and upgraded to allow eight car trains. Camellia station would have been demolished, and Rosehill station closed and replaced by a new underground station with a preliminary name of 'Rosehill/Camellia'. Carlingford station would also have been replaced by an underground station. Various proposals were put forward, including a three-way underground junction near Carlingford, linking the station to the proposed North West Rail Link, as well as the line to Chatswood. In 2003, the Minister for Transport, Michael Costa announced that only Stage 1 of the line, from Chatswood to Epping, would be built, but the Carlingford line section was indefinitely postponed.

Under the Rail Clearways Project, announced in 2004, the line was to have had a crossing loop at Rydalmere, thus allowing an increase in train frequency to half-hourly throughout the day. However, that part of the Clearways Project was cancelled in November 2008.

In August 2010, the federal government promised $2.6 billion towards the project, which, along with funding from the New South Wales Government, would have allowed the line to be extended from Epping to Parramatta via the Carlingford line. Work was to commence in 2011, with a projected 2017 finish. Following a change of government at the 2011 state election, the project was shelved. A large amount of land lies behind Carlingford station, for future extensions of the line.

=== Parramatta Light Rail ===
In 2013, Parramatta City Council published a feasibility study into a Western Sydney Light Rail network. The study proposed the construction of a light rail line from Parramatta to the Macquarie Centre, running parallel to the Carlingford line between Camelia and Dundas. The report noted that while the future of the railway line was a matter for the state government, conversion of the line to light rail would reduce the cost of the light rail's construction significantly.

In December 2015, the NSW government announced the Camellia to Carlingford section of the line would be converted to light rail, forming a branch of the Parramatta Light Rail network. That would replace the connection to the Sydney Trains network at Clyde with a link to Parramatta and Westmead. As a consequence, the Carlingford line north of Parramatta Road was closed on 5 January 2020 to allow conversion works to take place. Much of the remaining section closed permanently. That included Rosehill station, which is not on the light rail route. The short section between Clyde and the Parramatta Road level crossing will remain open to allow access to Sydney Trains' track inspection depot. The Sandown line was formally closed in July 2019. A replacement bus service, the route 535, was introduced from Parramatta to Carlingford, and is operated by Hillsbus. The level crossing across Parramatta Road was removed in late January 2020.

== Services ==
In its last years, all services on the line operated as shuttle services from Clyde. A few peak hour services operated to and from Central, but these had been withdrawn years before the line closed. With annual patronage of 569,000 for the year 2019, the Carlingford line was Sydney's least-used suburban railway line.

== Remains ==
The original tracks and overhead wiring were removed in January 2020 with the stations at Rydalmere, Telopea, Camellia and Carlingford demolished from April to May 2020. The only remnants of the original railway that were integrated with the light rail were the Parramatta River bridge at Rydalmere and the former Dundas station building.

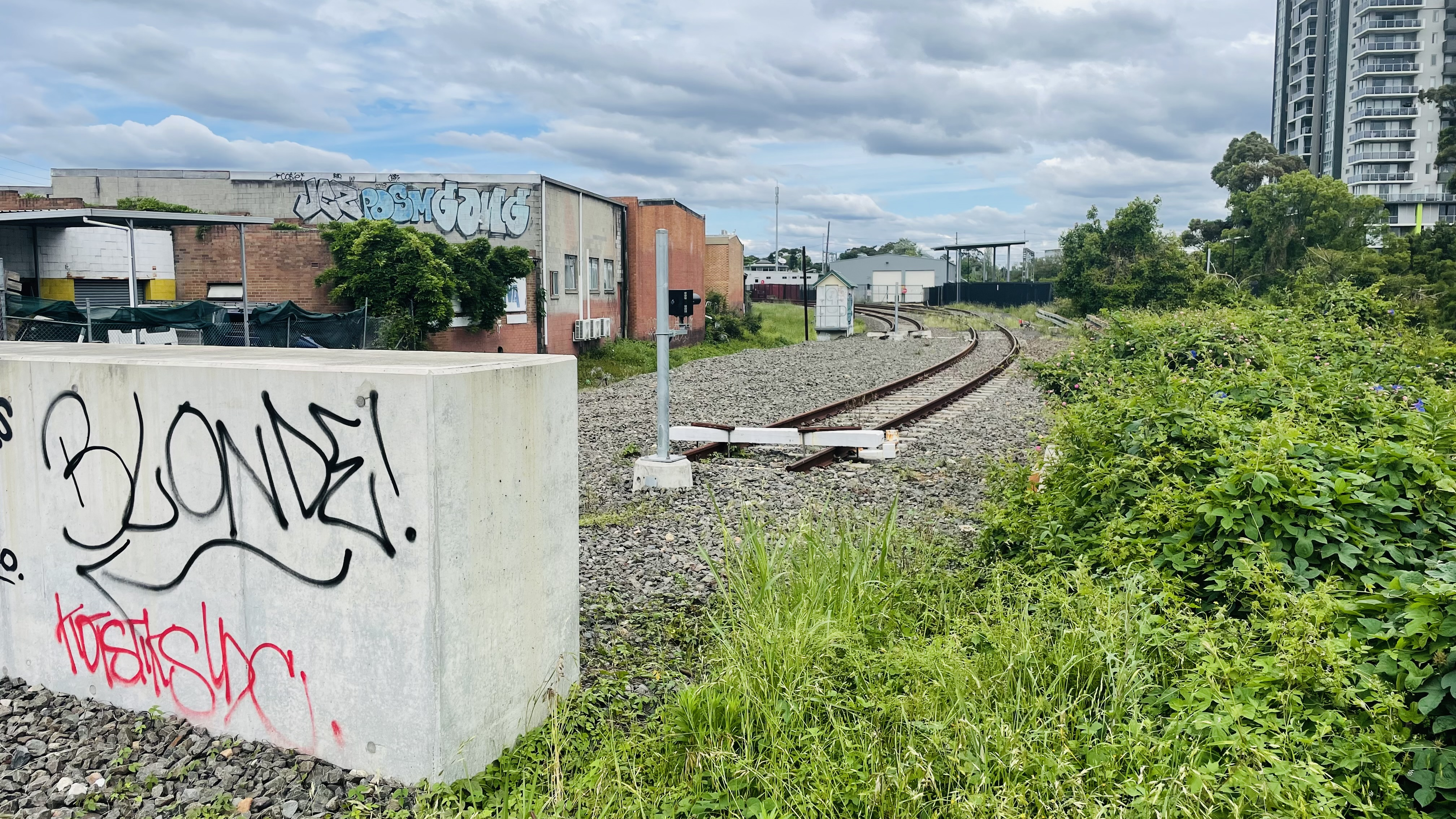
Truncation of the line just south of Parramatta Road, October 2022

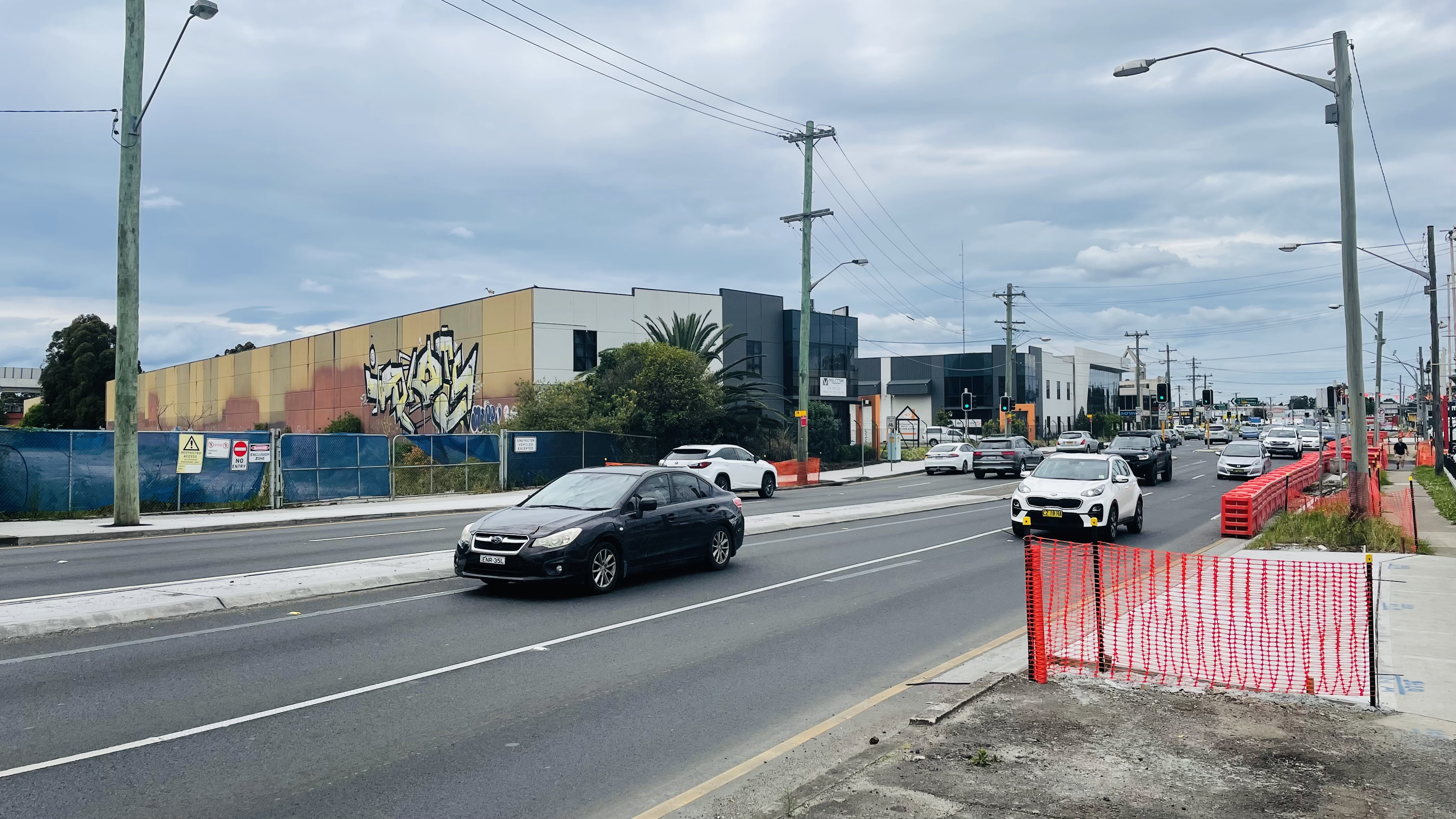
The site of the former level crossing at Parramatta Road, October 2022

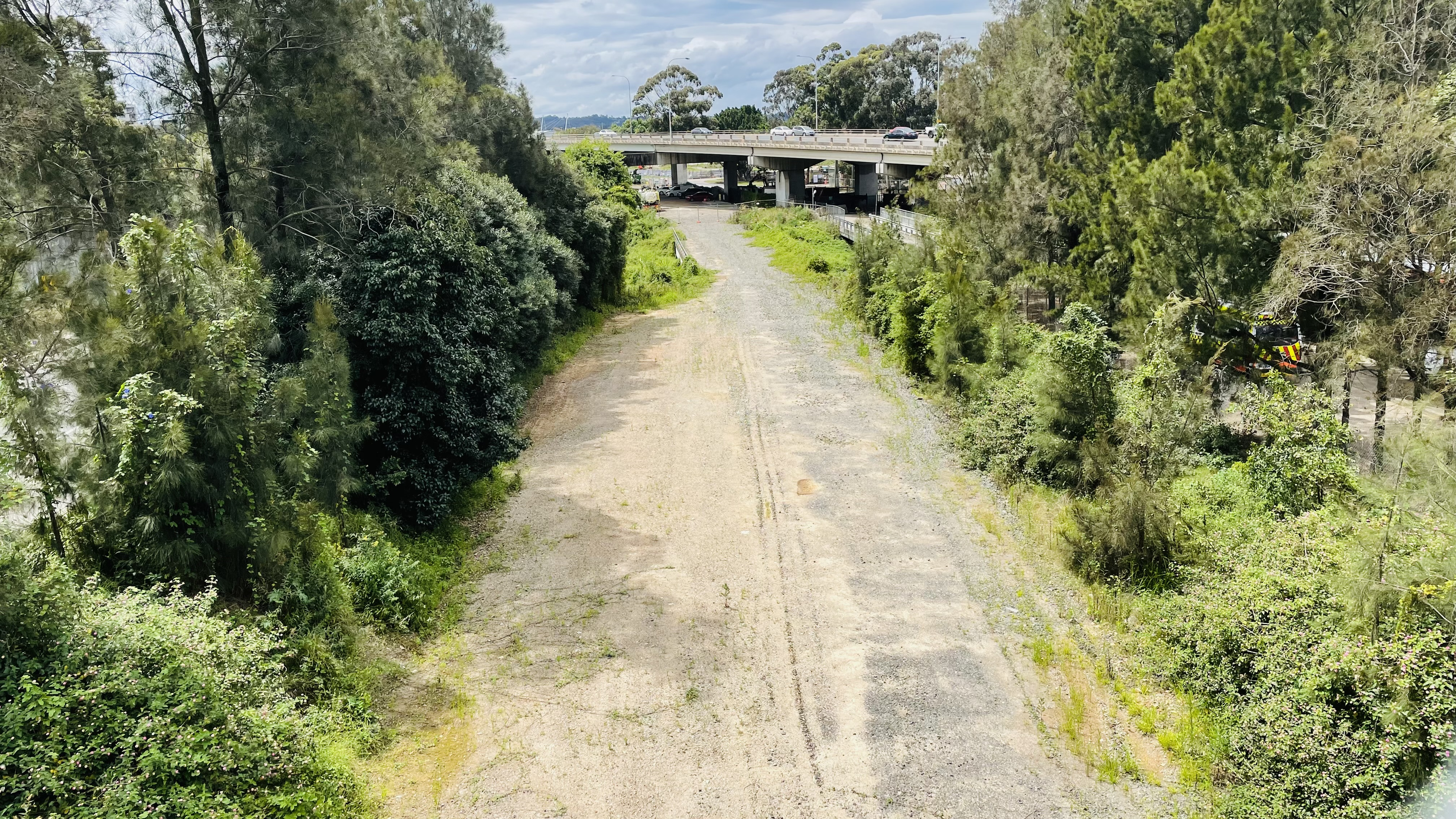
The former alignment alongside James Ruse Drive, October 2022

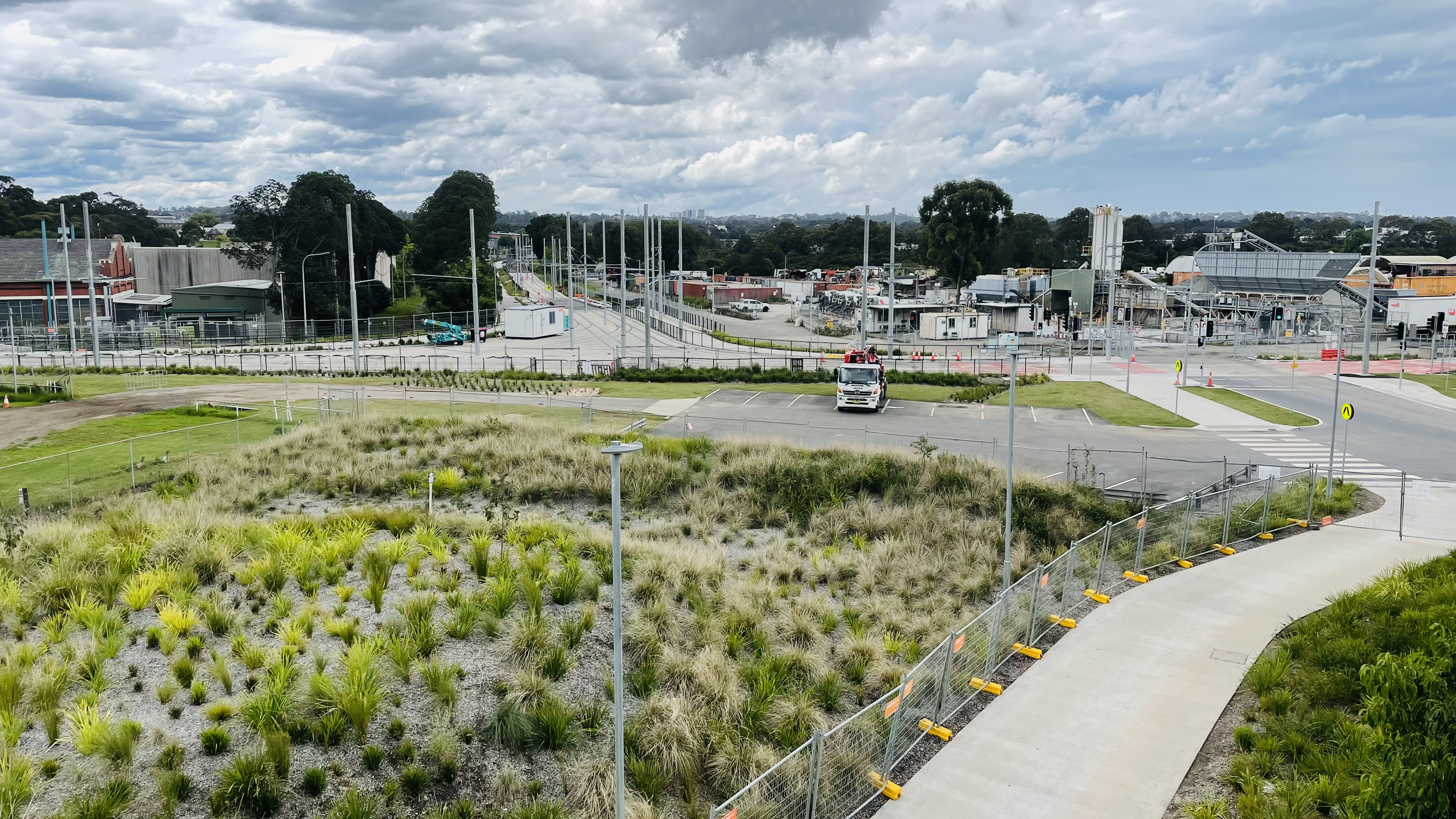
The site of the former Camellia Station, construction of Light Rail underway,
October 2022

== Rolling stock ==
Prior to the line being electrified, services were hauled by Z13 and Z20 class locomotives. Some services were operated by CPH railmotors. Electric services were operated by Standard suburban carriages and Sputnik Carriages then S sets and C sets in two and later four carriage formations from 1993 to 2019 then finally K and M sets from July 2019 to the line's closure. Set M30 held the honour of running the final revenue service for the T6 Carlingford Line.
