= Yallamundi light rail station =

Light rail station in Sydney, New South Wales, Australia

Yallamundi
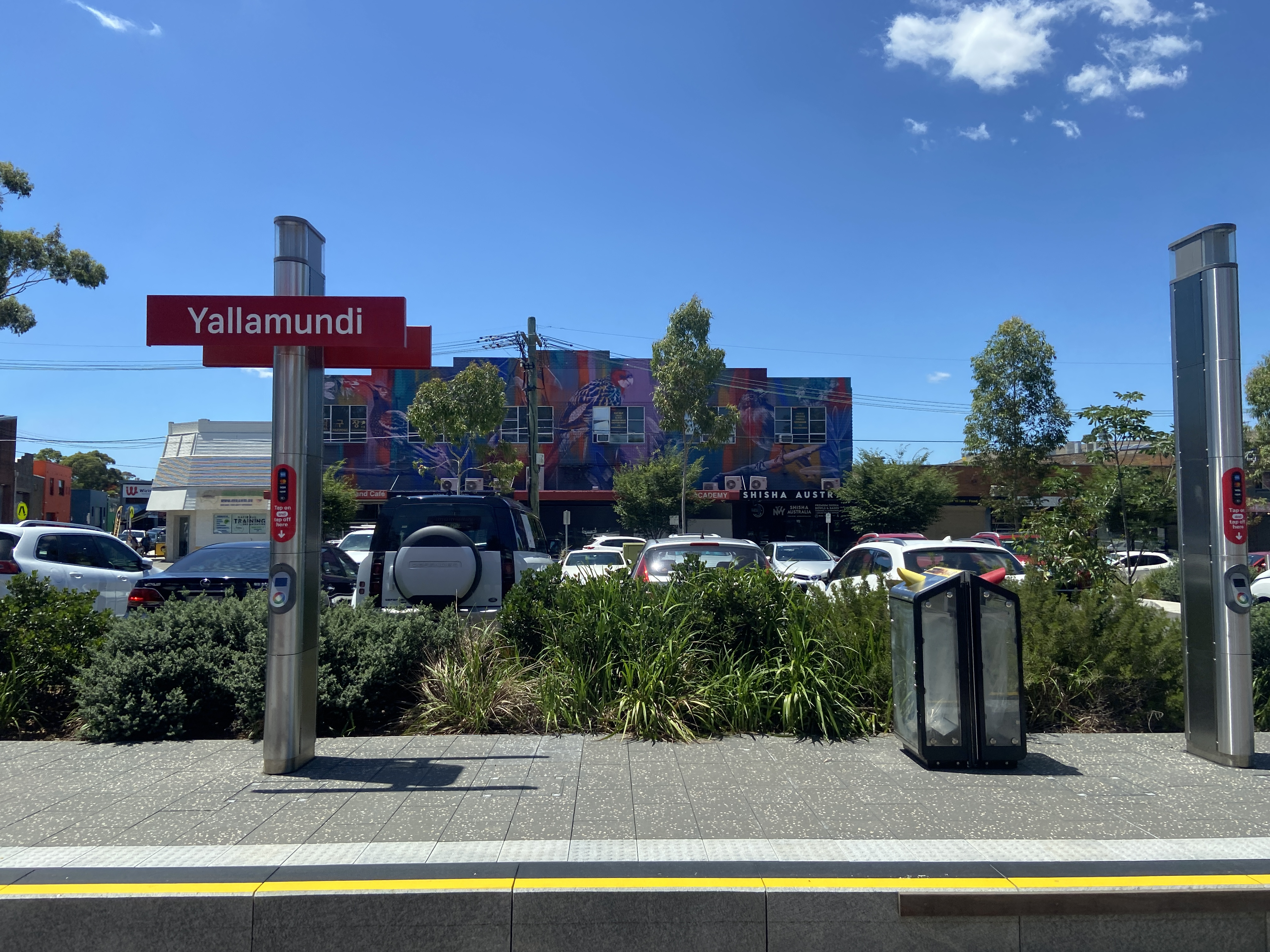
- View of a station sign on the platform, December 2024

General information
- Location: Brodie Street, Rydalmere; Sydney, New South Wales; Australia
- Coordinates: 33°48′37″S 151°01′45″E
- Owner: Transport Asset Manager of New South Wales
- Operator: Transdev Australasia
- Line: Parramatta Light Rail
- Platforms: 2 (2 side)
- Tracks: 2

Construction
- Structure type: Ground
- Accessible: Yes

Other information
- Status: Unstaffed
- Website: Yallamundi Light Rail

History
- Opened: 20 April 1896 (130 years ago) (as heavy rail); 20 December 2024 (20 months ago) (as light rail)
- Closed: 5 January 2020 (6 years ago) (as heavy rail)
- Rebuilt: 28 June 1993; 2020–2024
- Former names: Victoria Road (1896–1901); Rydalmere (1901–2022)

Passengers
- 2013: 150 (daily) (Sydney Trains, NSW TrainLink)
- Rank: 236

Services
Preceding station	Parramatta Light Rail	Following station
Rosehill Gardens towards Westmead	Westmead & Carlingford Line	Dundas towards Carlingford
Former services
Preceding station	Sydney Trains	Following station
Dundas towards Carlingford	Carlingford Line (1885–2020)	Camellia towards Clyde
Location

Yallamundi light rail station is a light rail station and former suburban railway station located on the Parramatta Light Rail, serving the Sydney suburb of Rydalmere. It is served by Sydney Light Rail L4 Westmead & Carlingford line services.

Before closure and conversion to light rail, the original station was located on the Carlingford line, and was served by Sydney Trains T6 Carlingford line services.

== History ==
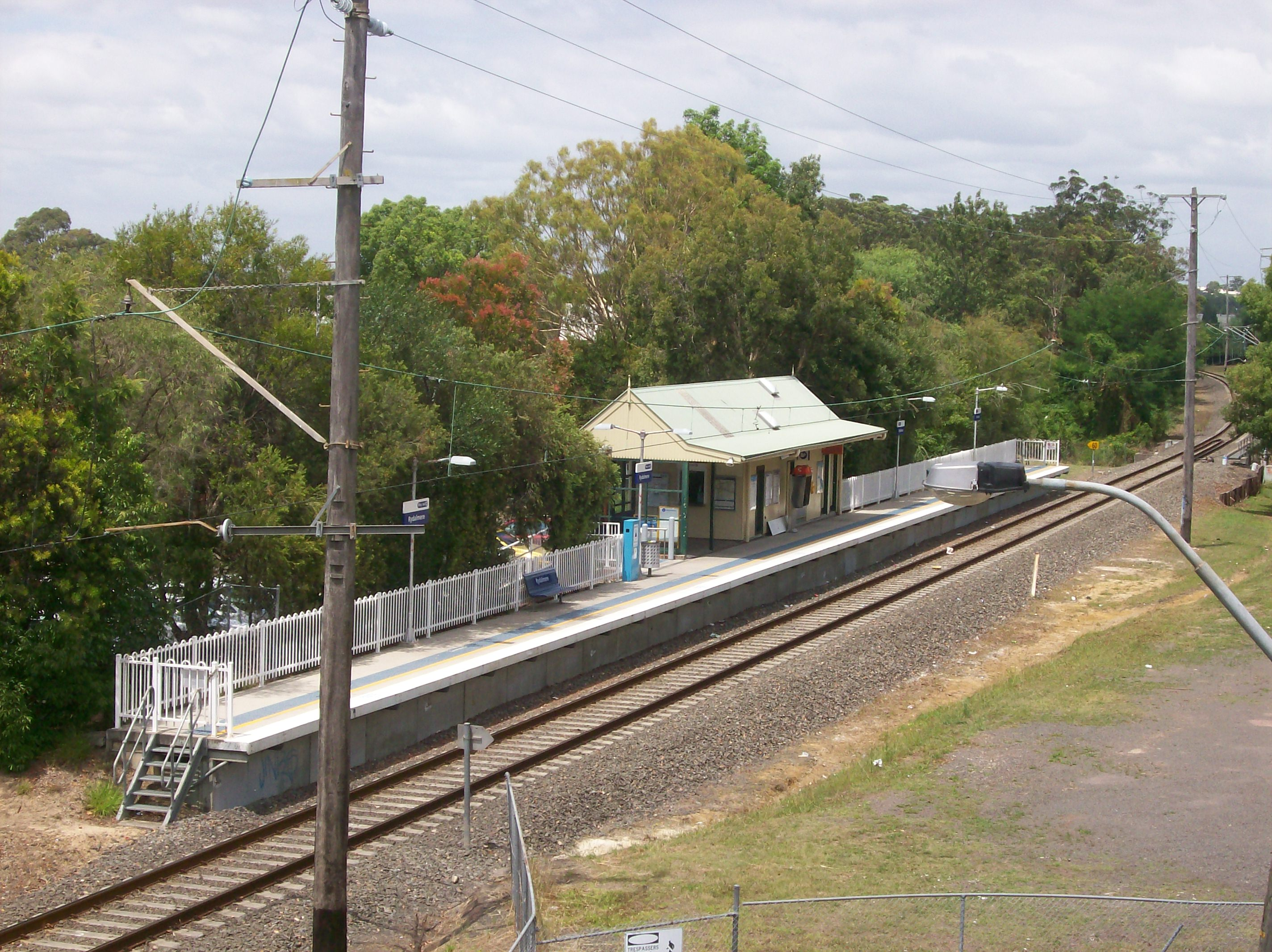
Rydalmere station platform and building in November 2012

=== Rydalmere railway station ===
The original station opened on 20 April 1896 as Victoria Road. It was renamed Rydalmere on 1 August 1901. The station was originally located on the western side of the line. It was replaced by a new station on the eastern side over the former goods siding on 28 June 1993.

=== Conversion to light rail ===
The station along with the rest of the Carlingford railway line closed on 5 January 2020, due to the conversion of the Camellia to Carlingford section of the Carlingford line to light rail as part of the Parramatta Light Rail project. The station and surrounding land were fully demolished in April 2020 .

Initial plans for the proposed light rail station retained the name Rydalmere. However, following extensive community consultation the new station was renamed Yallamundi in June 2022, a Darug word reflecting "storytelling" and connecting to the nearby Western Sydney University (Parramatta South) Campus. The light rail station opened on 20 December 2024 as part of Stage 1 of the Parramatta Light Rail.

== Services ==
=== Platforms ===
The station is served by light rail as follows:

Line	Stopping pattern	Notes
Parramatta Light Rail	services to Westmead & Carlingford	

At the time the station closed to suburban services, it was served as follows:

Platform	Line	Stopping pattern	Notes
1	T6	services to Carlingford services to Clyde	

=== Transport links ===
Yallamundi station is not served by any transport links.

However, before conversion State Transit operated six bus routes via Rydalmere station:

- 500X: Hyde Park via to Parramatta station
- 521: Eastwood to Parramatta station
- 523: West Ryde station to Parramatta station
- 524: West Ryde station to Parramatta station via Melrose Park
- 525: Westfield Burwood to Parramatta station

Rydalmere station was served by one NightRide route:

- N61: Carlingford station to Town Hall station
