= Dundas light rail station =

Light rail station in Sydney, New South Wales, Australia

Dundas
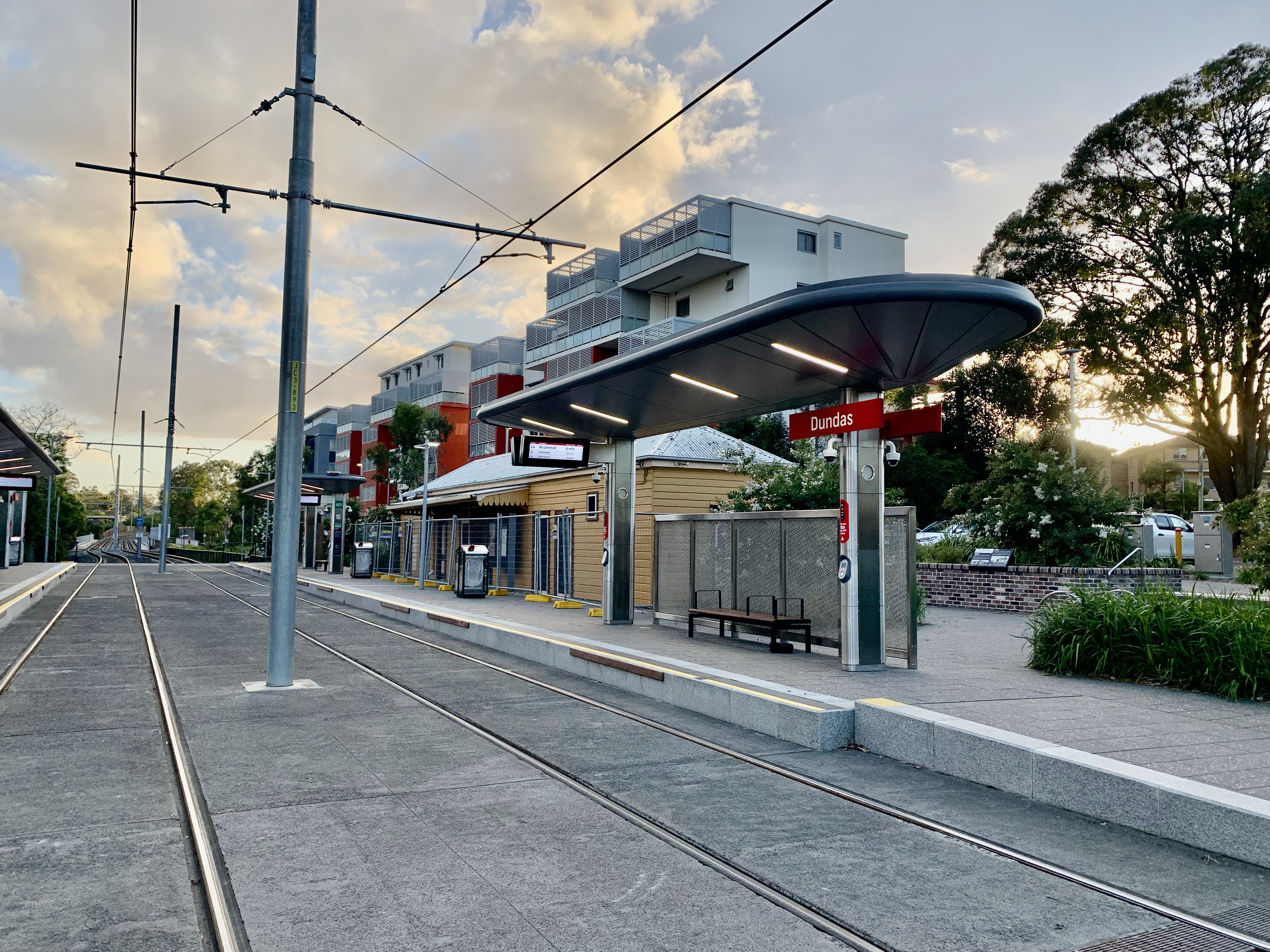
- Northbound view of the station, 2024

General information
- Location: Station Street, Dundas; Sydney, New South Wales; Australia
- Coordinates: 33°48′14″S 151°01′59″E
- Owner: Transport Asset Manager of New South Wales
- Line: Parramatta Light Rail
- Platforms: 2 (2 side)
- Tracks: 2
- Connections: Bus

Construction
- Structure type: Ground
- Accessible: Yes

Other information
- Status: Unstaffed
- Website: Dundas Light Rail; Dundas (pre-conversion)

History
- Opened: 20 April 1896 (as heavy rail); 20 December 2024 (as light rail)
- Closed: 5 January 2020
- Rebuilt: 2020–2024
- Electrified: 9 August 1959
- Former names: Kissing Point Road (1896–1901)

Passengers
- 2018: 390 (daily) (Sydney Trains, NSW TrainLink)

Services
Preceding station	Parramatta Light Rail	Following station
Yallamundi towards Westmead	Westmead & Carlingford Line	Telopea towards Carlingford
Former services
Preceding station	Sydney Trains	Following station
Telopea towards Carlingford	Carlingford Line (1885–2020)	Rydalmere towards Clyde
Location

Dundas light rail station is a light rail station and heritage-listed former suburban railway station serving the suburb of Dundas in Sydney, Australia. It was originally open between 1896 and 2020 on the Carlingford line, now forming part of the Parramatta Light Rail, served by L4 Westmead & Carlingford Line services.

== History ==
The station opened in 1896 as Kissing Point Road railway station. It was part of Bennett and Simpson's Railway, a private railway that was aimed at serving property subdivisions to the north and provide better transport options for producers from the fruit growing districts around Baulkham Hills, Castle Hill and Dural. It also comprised Bennett's private railway from Clyde to Rosehill constructed 1888, and the extension to Carlingford. This extension was constructed after investigations in 1891 and 1892 by the Minister for Works into the state of roads in the fruit growing district which saw the Simpson's Railway Act passed on 13 June 1893. The Act authorised the private construction of a railway line in three sections from Bennett's Railway line to Dural. Freight facilities were intended to be provided at the station to serve the nearby quarries.

The first section was to terminate at Carlingford, the second at Castle Hill (Rogans Hill) and the third at Dural. The Carlingford line was opened on 16 April 1896 but due to the increased costs and poor return from the freight and passenger service, it was decided not to proceed with the remaining sections. By the end of 1896, both Bennett's and Simpson's railways were in the hands of the Bank of New Zealand. The high cost of the Parramatta River bridge caused the financial collapse of the company and the station (along with the railway to Carlingford) was taken over in 1901 by the New South Wales Government Railways. The station was renamed Dundas at this time.

Dundas station was the last privately built and owned station building in New South Wales. It is also one of a very small number of platforms where access is at grade by crossing an operational railway line.

There was a severe fire in the station building in 2006, which destroyed the majority of the building's original fabric. It was reconstructed to the same design in 2007.

The Camellia to Carlingford section of the Carlingford railway line was closed for conversion to light rail as part of the Parramatta Light Rail project on 5 January 2020. It was reopened as part of the light rail line on 20 December 2024.

== Services ==
The station is served by light rail as follows:

Line	Stopping pattern	Notes
Parramatta Light Rail	services to Westmead & Carlingford	

At the time the station closed to suburban services, it was served as follows:

Platform	Line	Stopping pattern	Notes
1	T6	services to Carlingford services to Clyde	

== Transport links ==
Busways operates one bus route via Dundas station:

- 545: Parramatta station to Macquarie Park station via Eastwood

Dundas station is served by one NightRide route:

- N61: Carlingford station to City (Town Hall)

== Description ==
The station complex includes the reconstructed type 8 timber station building, metal passenger waiting area and concrete pedestrian crossing, all dating from 2007, and the original brick-faced platform, dating from 1896.

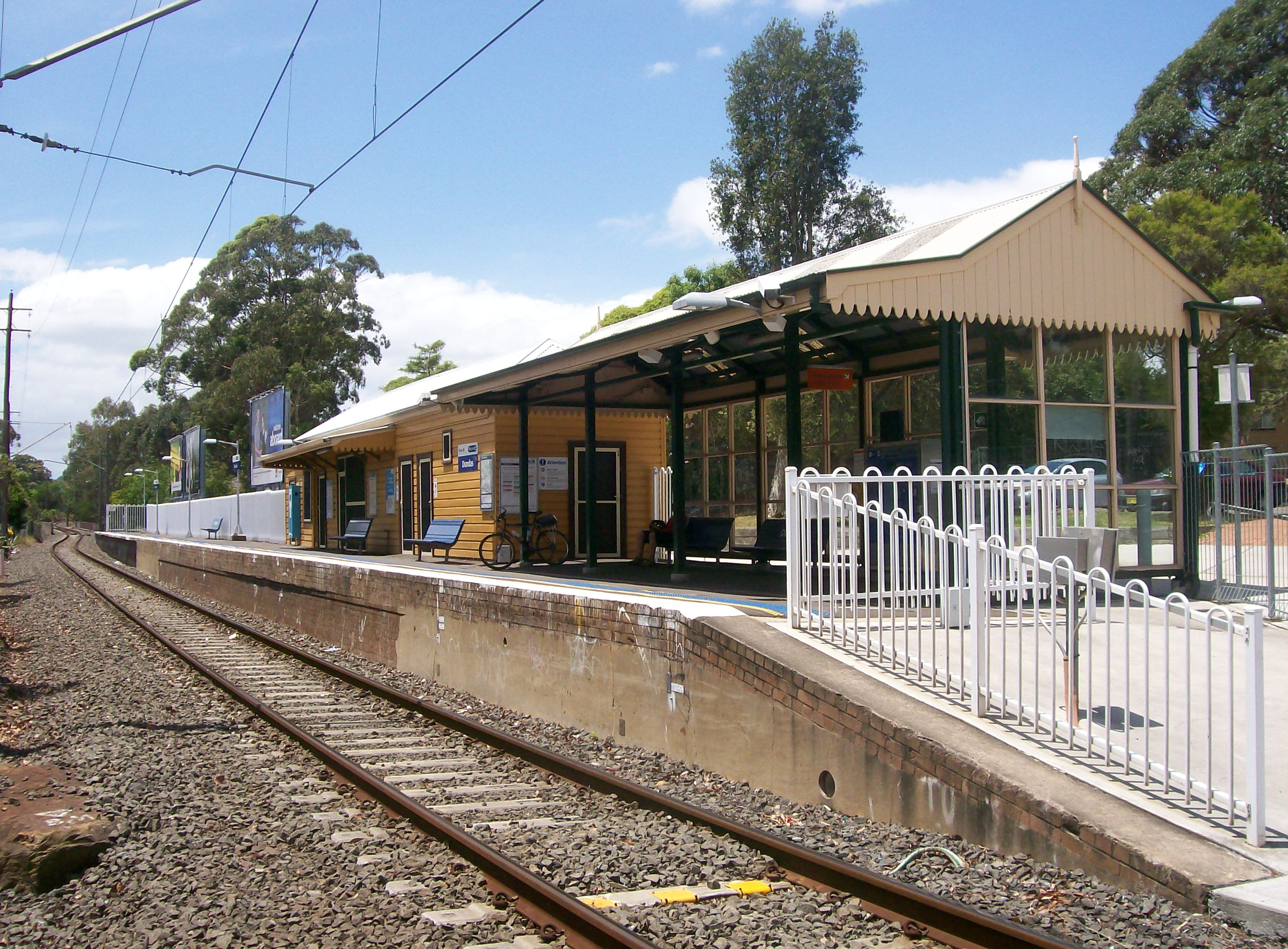
North-east bound view of the station platform, November 2012

=== Station building (2007) ===
The station building is a reconstruction of the original timber narrow awning building (type 8). It is a painted timber building with a hip and gabled galvanised iron roof, and a skillion extension on the Carlingford (Up) end of the building. Four entry points, a large window and a small square window are located on the platform side and are covered with security screens. These are also used on all other windows and doors and hide the timber panelled doors and four paned timber framed windows. Some of the window frames appear to be original. The Station Street elevation is characterised by one double door entry, two large windows and several high, small square windows. The Station Street entry, together with the main entry area on the other side of the building have small, cantilevered awnings with corrugated iron sheeting and decorative ends.

=== Passenger waiting area (2007) ===
Immediately adjacent to the timber building on the Rydalmere (Down) end of the building is a modern passenger waiting area with a gabled, galvanised metal roof canopy with a post supported awning to the platform side and vertical timber board ends. Glass and steel form the remainder of the structure.

=== Platform (1896) ===
The platform is brick faced with pedestrian access at grade by crossing an operational railway line. Modern lighting, information signs and fencing is located in appropriate areas on the platform and around the station. A commuter carpark is located on the Station Street side of the station.

=== Pedestrian Crossing (2007) ===
The pedestrian crossing with concrete approaches over the single line track is located just off the Down end of the platform.

=== Modifications and dates ===
- Post-1950: Footbridge and goods siding removed
- 1959: Toilets built
- 1992: Platform canopy attached to building at the Sydney end;
- 2006: Severe fire destroyed the Station Master's office and general waiting room
- 2007: The station building was largely reconstructed and repaired.
- date unknown: The skillion-roofed out-of shed attached to the Carlingford (Up) end
- 2010: Platform re-surfaced

== Heritage listing ==
Dundas railway station is significant for its small timber platform building which is the only known example of its type, characterised by close eaves with a small platform awning. The building however has lost its integrity having been reconstructed in 2007 after the original timber structure was destroyed by fire. The station is evidence of the construction of the private Bennett and Simpson Railway under the Simpsons' Railway Act in 1893, which provided transport to the northern suburbs, including Baulkham Hills, Castle Hill and Dural.

Dundas railway station was listed on the New South Wales State Heritage Register on 2 April 1999 having satisfied the following criteria.

The place is important in demonstrating the course, or pattern, of cultural or natural history in New South Wales.

Dundas Railway Station has historic significance as the only former privately built station building on the railway network. It is evidence of the construction of the Bennett and Simpson Railway to the northern suburbs, which was abandoned following construction of Stage 1 due to financial difficulties.

The original atypical "Type 8 – Narrow Awning Building" was destroyed by fire and largely reconstructed in 2007. It is however, the only extant example of its type providing evidence of the 'Type 8' style station building and is significant due to its construction as a good and true replica of the original building.

The place has a strong or special association with a person, or group of persons, of importance of cultural or natural history of New South Wales's history.

The station has historical associations with the construction of a private railway under the Simpson's' Railway Act in 1893, which provided transport to the northern suburbs such as Baulkham Hills, Castle Hill and Dural.

The place is important in demonstrating aesthetic characteristics and/or a high degree of creative or technical achievement in New South Wales.

Despite being largely reconstructed, the timber station building is aesthetically significant as an example of small atypical "Type 8" buildings featuring a small platform awning and close eaves.

The place has strong or special association with a particular community or cultural group in New South Wales for social, cultural or spiritual reasons.

The place has the potential to contribute to the local community's sense of place, and can provide a connection to the local community's past. Its historical associations with the local fruit producers of the time who agitated for the line is not considered as a special or strong association, and is no longer valid.

The place has potential to yield information that will contribute to an understanding of the cultural or natural history of New South Wales.

The timber building has the research potential for study into the type of building constructed on a private railway in Sydney in its reproduced form together with early plans.

The place possesses uncommon, rare or endangered aspects of the cultural or natural history of New South Wales.

Dundas station building, despite being a reconstruction, is the only known example of "Type 8" narrow awning railway station building. It provides evidence of such small timber atypical railway buildings. It has some rarity in this regard.

The place is important in demonstrating the principal characteristics of a class of cultural or natural places/environments in New South Wales.

The building is representative of a railway station building type no longer extant on the railway network in NSW although it is unknown how many of the 23 planned buildings were built.
