= New South Wales K set =

Retired class of electric multiple unit operated in Sydney, Australia

K set
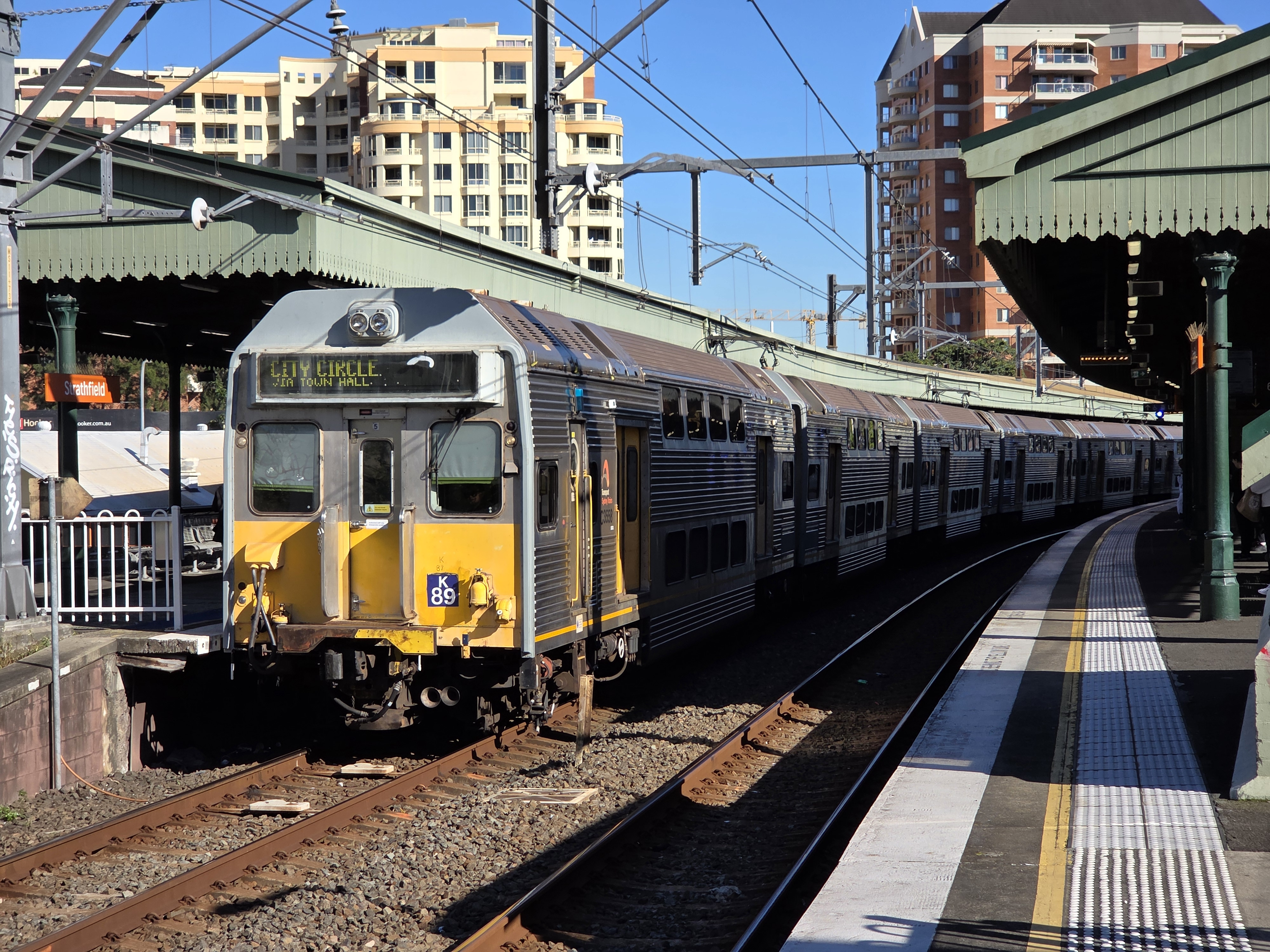
- K89 and K66 at Strathfield on a City Circle service in 2025

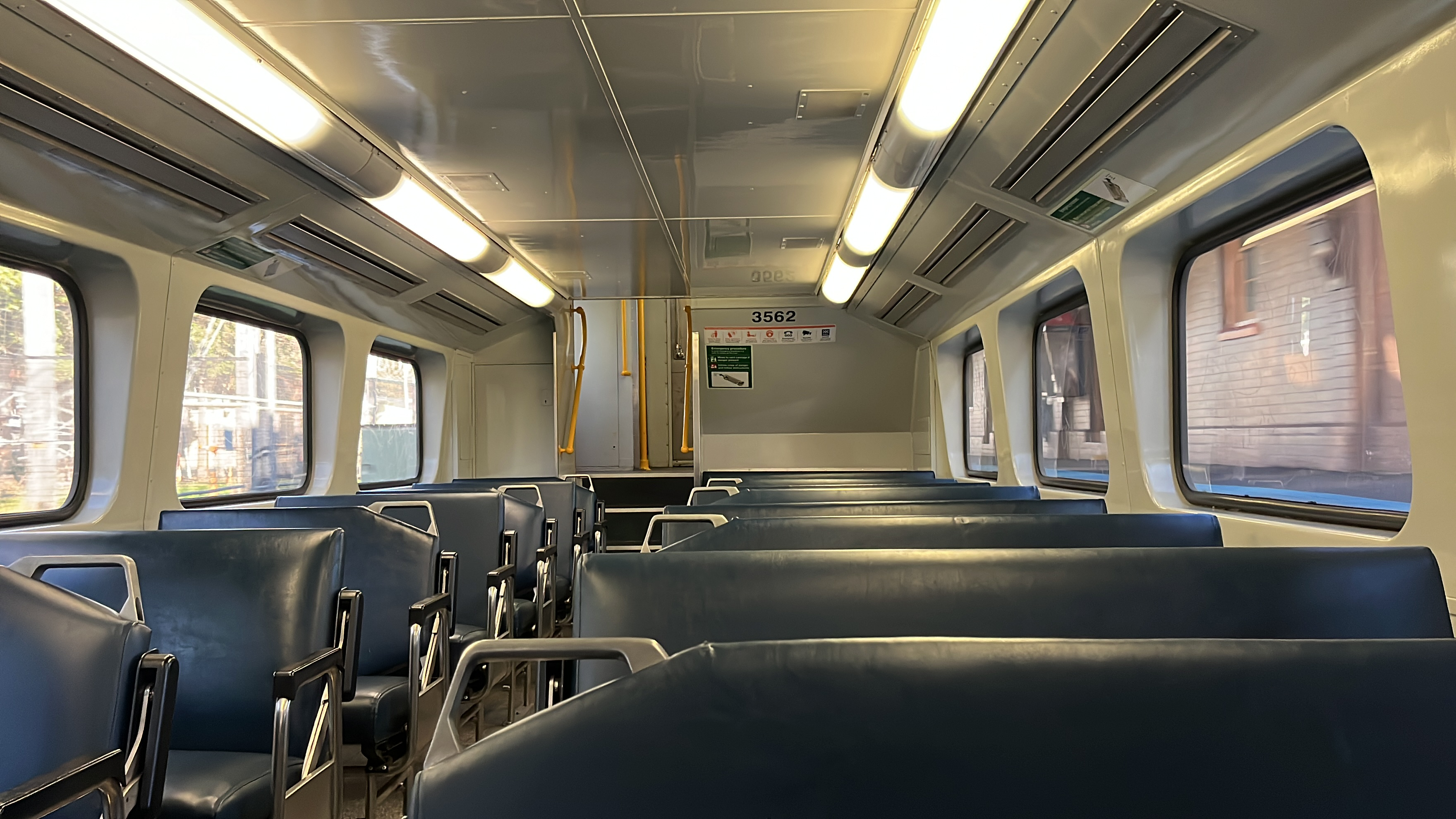
- Lower deck
- Stock type: Electric multiple unit
- In service: 15 October 1981 – 2 October 2026
- Manufacturer: A Goninan & Co
- Built at: Broadmeadow
- Constructed: 1981–1985
- Refurbished: late 1990s, early 2020s (life extensions)
- Number built: 160 carriages (40 sets)
- Number retired: 18 carriages (4.5 sets)
- Number scrapped: 142 carriages
- Successor: Converted H sets
- Formation: 4-car sets
- Fleet numbers: C3501–C3580; D4096–D4099; T4171–T4246; K60–K99 (full 4-car sets)
- Capacity: 452 (108 in power cars, 118 in trailers)
- Operators: State Rail Authority; CityRail; Sydney Trains
- Depot: Flemington
- Lines served: North Shore & Western (ceased 2017); Leppington & Inner West; Liverpool & Inner West (ceased April 2026); Carlingford (ceased 2020); Airport & South

Specifications
- Train length: 81.54 m (267 ft 6 1/4 in)
- Car length: 20,385 mm (66 ft 10 1/2 in)
- Width: 3,036 mm (9 ft 11 1/2 in)
- Height: 4,368 mm (14 ft 4 in)
- Doors: Sliding pocket, 2 per side
- Maximum speed: 115 km/h (71 mph)
- Weight: 188 t (185 long tons; 207 short tons)
- Traction system: Mitsubishi camshaft resistance control
- Traction motors: 4 × Mitsubishi 150 kW (201 hp) series wound DC motor
- Power output: 1.2 MW (1,609 hp)
- Transmission: 5.73:1 (86:15) gear ratio
- Electric systems: 1,500 V DC (nominal) from overhead catenary
- Current collection: Pantograph
- UIC classification: Bo′Bo′+2′2′+2′2′+Bo′Bo′
- Track gauge: 1,435 mm (4 ft 8 1/2 in) standard gauge

The New South Wales K set is a class of double-decker electric multiple unit trains (EMUs) that formerly operated on Sydney's suburban railway network. Built by A Goninan & Co, the K sets first entered service in 1981 operating under the State Rail Authority, and later CityRail and Sydney Trains before being retired from service in October 2026. The first set entered service as 8 car R1 (not used for 6 car trains until 1984).

When R sets later started to include sets made up of older Comeng and Goninan stock, the newer Goninan sets were retargeted as K sets and later reduced to four cars. The carriages are of stainless steel, double deck construction and share much of their design with the older S sets.

In June 2026, the K sets were temporarily suspended from service due to vandalism and security-related concerns. The K sets received a farewell tour for their final regular timetabled service from 28 September–2 October and ran a farewell service on 5 October for the Transport Heritage Expo.

== Design and construction ==
The K sets were the first New South Wales suburban trains to be air-conditioned and have headlights.

Two orders were placed for the K sets with all manufactured between 1981 and 1985 by A Goninan & Co in Broadmeadow:

- Order 1

Qty	Class	Carriage numbers	Notes
50	Power cars	C3501–C3550	Built without pantographs for AC. Pantographs instead built on trailers.
4	Driving trailers	D4096–D4099	converted to trailer cars 2014
46	Trailer cars	T4171–T4216	Pantographs at the leading end for AC on power cars

- Order 2

Qty	Class	Carriage numbers
30	Power cars	C3551–C3580
30	Trailer cars	T4217–T4246

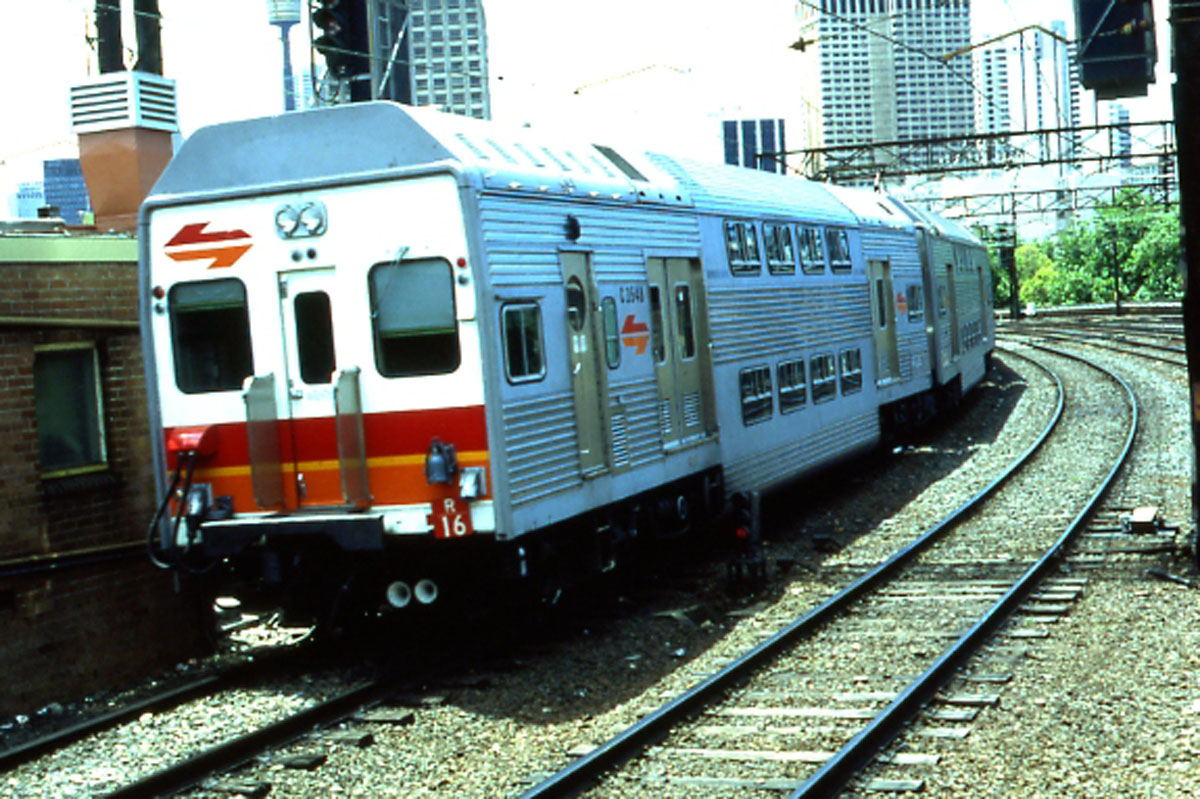
A Series 1 K set in State Rail Authority candied livery in the 1980s. It is identified as a Series 1 by having less fluting around the upper deck and a straight roofline. Some sets were originally classified as R sets.

The first order featured low-mounted upper-deck windows, off-white and sagebrush grey interiors, and unpainted fronts, though at least one had its front painted in State Rail Authority candy livery (see picture to the left).

The second order featured higher mounted upper deck windows, yellow and mustard interiors and State Rail Authority candy livery fronts. These cars can be distinguished from the first batch by more fluting around the top deck windows, and a raised roofline in the middle to accommodate the higher windows.

The first four trailers were built as driving trailers allowing them to operate in two-car formation, although in practice they were formed into four carriage sets and often ran together as one eight-car set until 1988. These also differed in the subsequent deliveries in being fitted with air conditioning from new, rather than pressure ventilation.

To provide a spare to the first 8 car air conditioned cars, C3550 and T4216 were also built with air conditioning. All ten carriages were fitted with different windows, being sheet glass with small opening hoppers. This was replaced with sheet glass in 1993.

To accommodate the air conditioning and associated equipment, the pantograph had to be shifted to the adjacent trailer car to which the power car is semi-permanently coupled with high-voltage cables connecting the two cars. Although some power cars and trailers have been broken up and married with others during periods of heavy maintenance, many original combinations remain.

The control carriages have a flat front, with headlights at the top. They were built with four sets of marker lights, standard at the time. Different combinations of white marker lights were used to indicate different destinations. Flip-dot destination displays were installed later on, which covered the upper middle marker light. Since destination displays have been installed, marker light combinations are no longer necessary, so usually only the two upper marker lights are used.

However, some trains still retain the switch for the lower marker light. The front of the train also has an emergency door for the guard compartment and windscreen wipers for the driver window only. Hoses and receptacles are provided below the windows to connect another set, since, unlike newer trains, the coupler does not carry electrical or air connections.

Like other trains of the time, the crew compartment contains a smaller compartment for the driver on the left side (in direction of travel). The guard uses the area outside of the driver's compartment, with two manual hinged doors on either side providing access to platforms. Above these doors, on the outside are blue lights indicating which compartment the guard is in.

Each vestibule has two-panel sliding doors on either side. Each door also has a vent underneath the window, which was covered when air-conditioning was installed. The doors cannot detect obstacles and continue pushing against the obstruction until it is removed or the guard reopens the doors. Small orange LEDs are located above the doors on the outside that flash when the doors are closing. They assist the guard in locating doors that have not closed successfully. All trains were retrofitted with traction interlocking, meaning the driver cannot apply power when the doors are open.

== In service ==
All K sets are crewed with a driver and guard. The guard uses the rear cab on a four-car train. On eight car trains, the guard usually uses the fifth carriage so that the entire platform can be seen. However the fourth carriage cab can also be used if there is a problem with the fifth carriage one.

All the K sets were delivered to either Hornsby or Punchbowl depots. With the trials on the ten experimental carriages judged successful, in 1986 a programme commenced to retrofit air conditioning to the second order. This saw the Beclawat windows replaced with sheet glass. It would be July 1990 before the programme was completed.

In April 1989, K sets commenced operating peak-hour services via the North Shore line to Gosford. This was extended to Wyong in January 1992. In September 1990, all Punchbowl based sets were transferred to Hornsby.

In January 1991, four sets were transferred to Flemington Maintenance Depot to operate peak-hour Illawarra line services to Port Kembla.

To replace U sets on stopping services between Gosford and Newcastle, the sets with driving trailers were re-marshaled as two-car sets from October 1996.

Following the delivery of the outer suburban Tangara sets in 1994, the K sets ceased operating the Central Coast and Illawarra services.

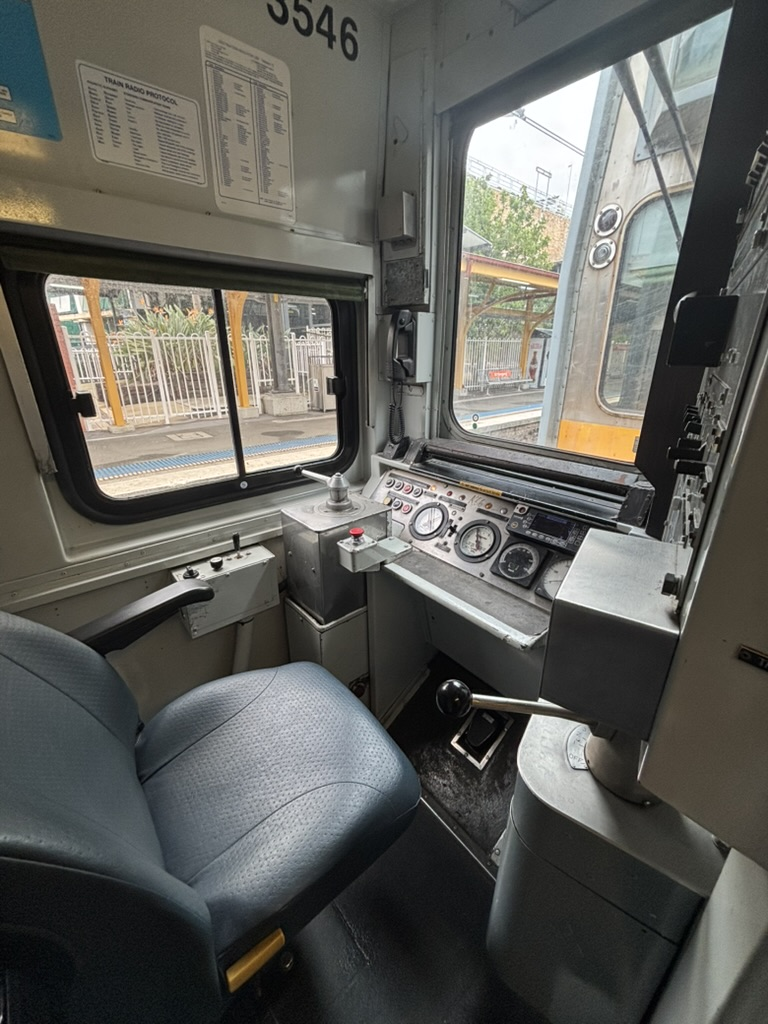
Cab of K66 C3546

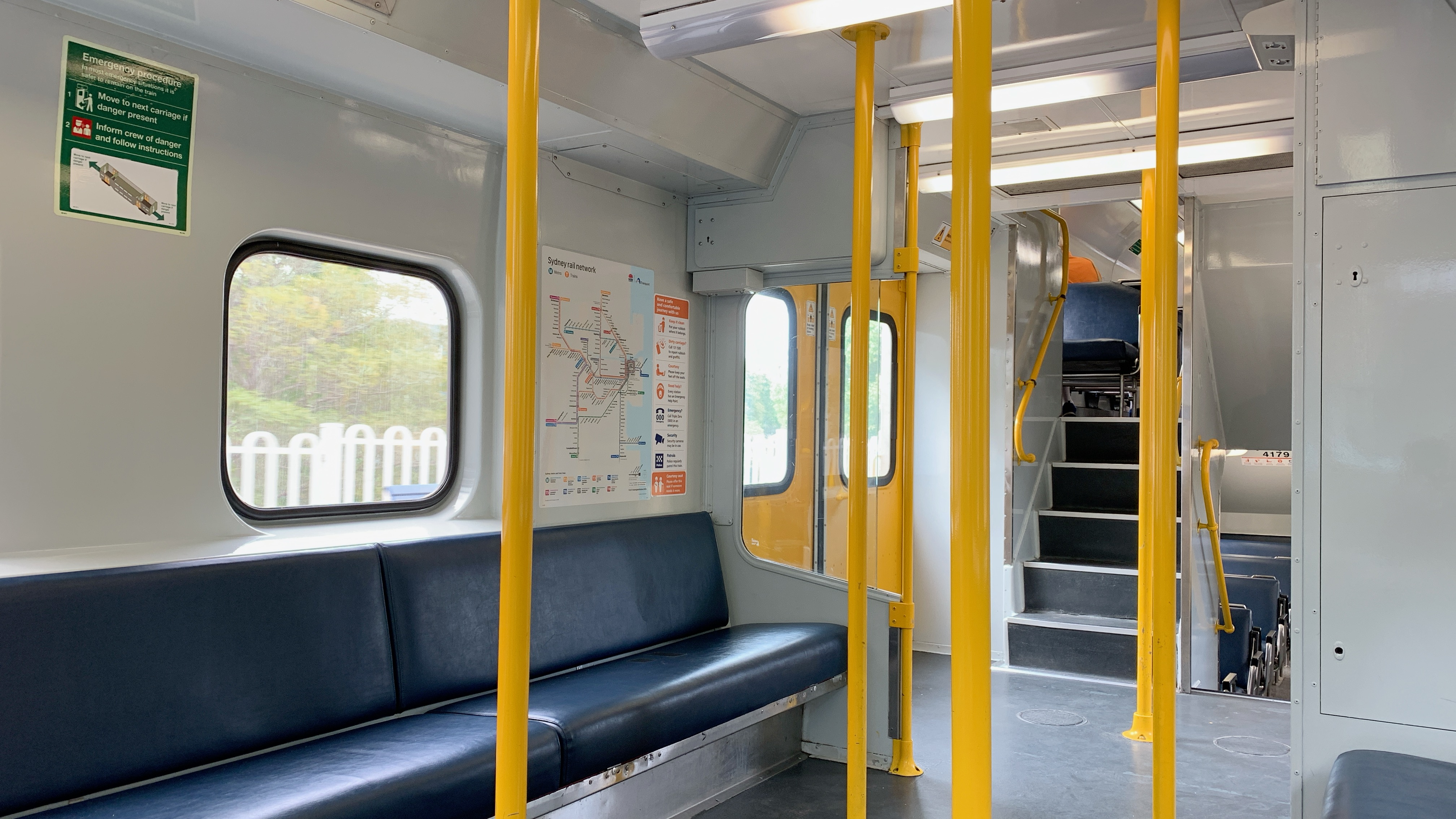
Refurbished vestibule

During the late 1990s, all were refurbished by A Goninan & Co as part of the CityDecker program. This saw the interiors refurbished with white walls and ceilings, grey floors and blue seats. Power cars received a destination indicator and had yellow applied to the lower half of their fronts. Sliding Beclawat windows on the pressure ventilated cars were replaced with hopper windows and doors painted yellow. The first order was finally retrofitted with air conditioning just prior to the Sydney 2000 Olympics.

These cars retained the hopper windows until the late 2000s, but were sealed shut with an adhesive to avoid the loss of air conditioning. After the introduction of a new timetable in October 2009, all K sets were allocated to Hornsby to operate North Shore, Northern & Western line services, operating in 8-car formations.

This was due to the noise levels inside trains when operating on the Epping to Chatswood segment. Older S sets lack sufficient sound insulation for passengers, while newer Tangara sets do not have sufficient cooling in the braking system to deal with extended shuttle runs through the tunnel.

In October 2013, the 2-car K sets (K1–K4) were withdrawn from NSW TrainLink Gosford to Newcastle services. The four driving trailers were converted to ordinary trailers at Hornsby and the sets returned to service on Sydney Trains services in March 2014 as K98 and K99. The existing K98 was re-numbered K91.

The driver cabins in these carriages were stripped of controls however the actual walls were kept intact. The doors to the driver cabin are kept locked and the blinds are kept down. There are no passenger seats where the crew compartment used to be. Also, unlike converted S set cars, the round window on the crew compartment doors were removed and covered with a metal plate.

In mid-2014, K sets were gradually transferred from Hornsby to Flemington resulting in their resumption of service on the Airport, Inner West & South, Bankstown, Carlingford and Olympic Park lines. K60 to K86 were previously running these lines, based out of Flemington Depot. Prior to 2017, K87–99 continued to run part-time on the T1 North Shore, Northern & Western lines.

In July 2017, asbestos was found in the circuit breaker panels, which is inside the driver compartment of the K sets, with all withdrawn for inspection for a few weeks. All have since returned to service.

After the introduction of a new timetable in November 2017, all K sets were transferred to Sector 2.

In late 2017 and early 2018, all K sets and C sets were slightly refurbished with all poles and other safety features repainted yellow.

In 2019, set K96 was withdrawn from passenger service and had automatic train protection (ATP) equipment installed. It conducted ATP testing and it was initially decided that K96 will be retained following the retirement of the rest of the fleet for this purpose. In 2022, set K96 was retired and stripped for parts to keep other K sets in service.

K sets previously operated on the following lines:

- T1 North Shore, Northern & Western Line (until 26 November 2017)
- T2 Leppington & Inner West Line: Leppington or Parramatta to City Circle via Granville (until 28 September 2026)
- T3 Liverpool & Inner West Line: Liverpool to City Circle via Regents Park (until 17 April 2026)
- T8 Airport & South Line: Macarthur to City Circle via Airport or Sydenham (until 30 September 2026)

They were formerly in operation on the T6 Carlingford Line until it was closed in January 2020.

K sets were taken out of service in June 2026 due to persistent vandalism, causing delays across the wider Sydney Trains network. Sydney Trains CEO Matt Longland confirmed that the trains would not be retired at this time.

Final revenue service K set at Central

On 11 September 2026, a farewell tour for the K sets was announced, it took place across the network between 28 September and 2 October. The final runs saw the train travel on the T2 Leppington & Inner West, T6 Lidcombe & Bankstown, T4 Eastern Suburbs & Illawarra, T1 North Shore & Western, T5 Cumberland and T9 Northern Lines. However, following vandalism and security-related concerns the planned service to Emu Plains and Bankstown were cancelled, along with the early termination of the Leppington-bound service at Liverpool. An extra two services took place at the Transport Heritage Expo on 5 October, this saw the train travel along the T1 North Shore & Western and T9 Northern Lines.

=== Tekno Train ===
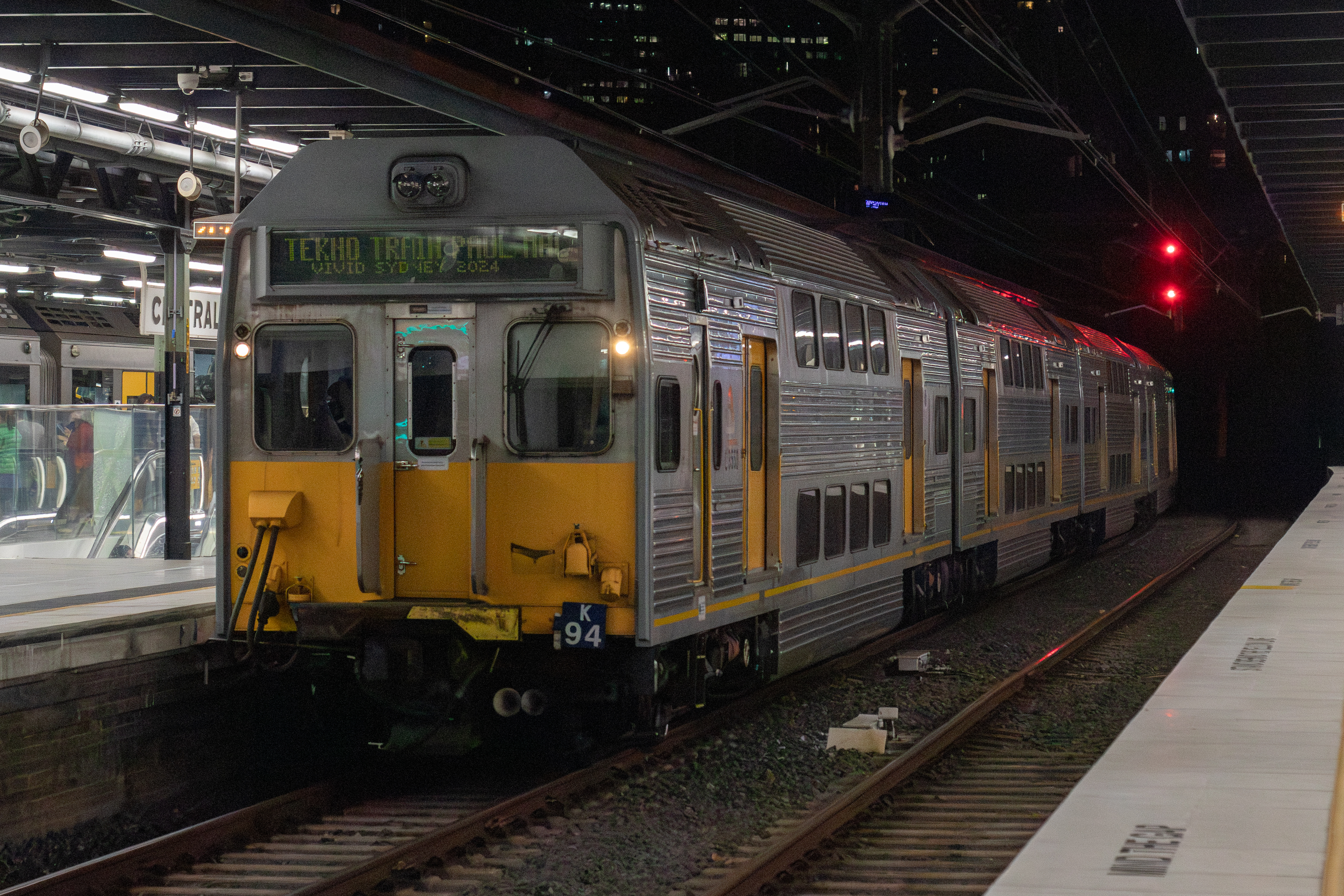
Tekno Train at Central station

As part of Vivid Sydney 2024, set K94 was modified with LED strip lights, large-scale speakers and strobe lights for the 'Tekno Train', an event organised by Australian musician Paul Mac. The train departed from Central station on three different trips, one over the Harbour Bridge to Milsons Point and back, and two around the City Circle and through to Turrella via the Illawarra line and the Airport Link; using the Macdonaldtown stabling sidings to turn around after each trip. It featured a mix of classic and purpose-written music by Mac to accompany the train on its journey, with occasional commentary included. The Tekno Train ran every night from 24 May to 15 June 2024.

=== Retirement ===
As of 5 October 2026, all K sets have been retired.

On 23 January 2026, three sets, K91 (C3576, T4242, T4232, C3566), K80 (C3511, T4177, T4202, C3536), and K68 (C3513, T4179, T4208, C3542), were transferred by locomotives 42103 and 42105. On 12 April 2026, two sets, K65 and K73, were taken by 4827 and 4819.

On 6 March 2026, K99 entered back into service after being in extended storage at ACDEP.

As of 16 October 2026, K61, K94, half of K95, K98 and K99 have yet to be sent for scrapping.

=== Preservation ===
As of June 2026, there are no developed plans for the preservation of any K set cars, though the Sydney Electric Train Society has expressed interest in preserving at least one. Transport Heritage NSW has expressed no interest in preserving a K set for heritage purposes.

Several heritage tours have used K sets prior to retirement, these have been:

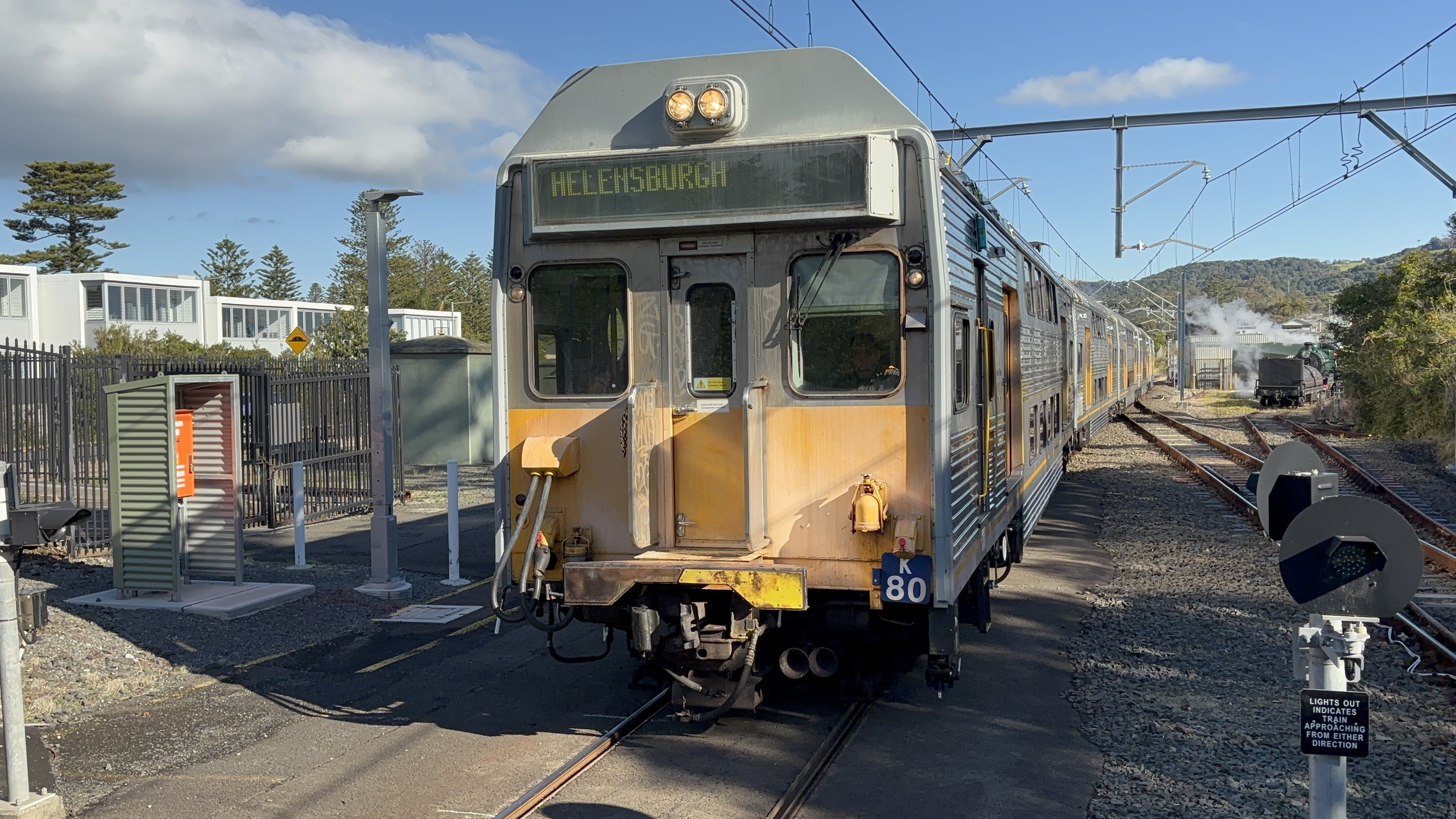
K66 (K80 trailing) arriving into Kiama station

- K set to Kick off 1997 Tour (SETS, 8 March 1997)
- New and Old Electrics Tour (SETS, 22 December 2012)
- Rivers to the Shore Tour (HET, 16 April 2023)**
- ARHS K set to Newcastle Tour (HET/ARHS, 27 May 2023)**
- Silver Set to the Summit (HET, 9 June 2024)**
- Sliver to the Sea (HET, 26 July 2025)
- The Christmas K set (HET, 13 and 14 December 2025)
- Silver Sunset (SBM/HET/STM, 30 May 2026)
- K Set Farewell (HET/THNSW, 5 October 2026)

**substituted in place of an S set
