= Dundas, New South Wales =

Dundas
- Suburb
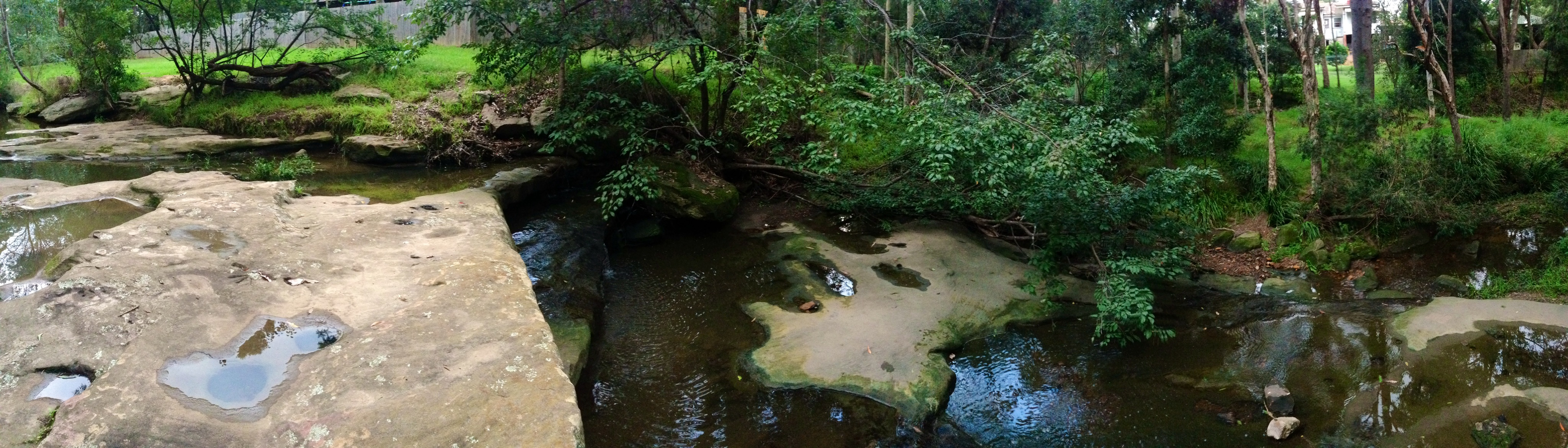
- The Ponds Creek, Dundas

- Interactive map of Dundas
- Country: Australia
- State: New South Wales
- City: Sydney
- LGA: City of Parramatta
- Location: 21 km (13 mi) NW of Sydney CBD

Government
  - State electorate: Parramatta
  - Federal divisions: Bennelong; Parramatta

Area
  - Total: 1.3 km^{2} (0.50 sq mi)
- Elevation: 30 m (98 ft)

Population
  - Total: 4,959 (2021 census)
  - Density: 3,810/km^{2} (9,900/sq mi)
- Postcode: 2117
Suburbs around Dundas
| Oatlands | Telopea | Dundas Valley |
| North Parramatta | Dundas | Eastwood |
| Rydalmere | Rydalmere | Ermington |

Dundas is a suburb of Sydney, New South Wales, Australia. Dundas is located 21 kilometres north-west of the Sydney central business district, in the local government area of the City of Parramatta, and the electoral division of Bennelong. Dundas is a leafy green suburb, notably due to its centrepiece The Ponds Walk, which follows the Ponds Subiaco Creek. Dundas's postcode is part of the Northern Sydney region.

== History ==
Dundas and surrounding areas were originally known as "The Ponds", a name still reflected in The Ponds Creek. The first private land grants in Sydney made in 1791 were in what is now North East Dundas and adjoining Dundas Valley and Ermington. This consisted of land grants to 14 former convicts and their families along the Ponds and Subiaco Creeks.

Reverend Samuel Marsden selected an area of 100 acres in the Field of Mars Parish, and named his farm "Dundas Farm" in honour of Henry Dundas, 1st Viscount Melville, who was also the Principal Secretary of State for the Home Department. The area, nonetheless, was not known as Dundas until almost a century later.

The name Dundas came from one of the "hundreds" in which the County of Cumberland was divided into. The Hundred of Dundas was a county division that stretched from the Field of Mars Parish in the south to Berowra and surrounding parishes to the far north. The Field of Mars including the modern-day suburbs of Marsfield, Macquarie Park, Carlingford, Epping and Dundas.

When the Dundas Post Office on Kissing Point Road opened on 1 March 1861, it was called the Pennant Hills Post Office, but this changed to Field of Mars in 1867. In 1890 it was finally called Dundas Post Office. In this interim period, the area was known as Pennant Hills within the Field of Mars, a name reflected in the notable Pennant Hills (Quarry), visited by Charles Darwin, that operated in the area for some time.

== Heritage listings ==
Dundas has a number of heritage-listed sites, including (but not limited to):

- Station Street: Dundas railway station

== Population ==
According to the 2021 census, there were 4,959 residents in Dundas. 51.2% of people were born in Australia. The most common countries of birth were China 11.3% and South Korea 6.0%. 46.3% of people only spoke English at home. Other languages spoken at home included Mandarin 13.6%, Korean 8.3%, Cantonese 7.5% and Arabic 3.3%. The most common responses for religion were No Religion 31.7% and Catholic 24.5%. The majority of households were families (78.0%) and there were also single person households (19.0%).

== Transport ==
Dundas railway station, a former heavily rail station now on the Parramatta Light Rail line, serves Dundas. The heritage listed station is located on Station Street, connects to Kissing Point Road by footpath.

Busways routes that pass through Dundas include the 545 Parramatta to Macquarie Park service via Kissing Point Road and the 521 Parramatta to Eastwood service via Park Road.

== Schools ==
- St Patrick's Marist College Dundas, located on Kirby Street, is a Catholic secondary school and plays host to the Shamrocks Dundas JRLFC Football Club.
- Dundas Public School is located between Kissing Point Road and Calder Road.

== Churches ==
- Dundas Ermington Uniting Church is located on the corner of Kissing Point Road and Park Road in Dundas.
- The Church of Scientology's Sydney Rehabilitation Project Force is located in Dundas.
