= Clyde railway station, Sydney =

Railway station in Sydney, New South Wales, Australia

Clyde
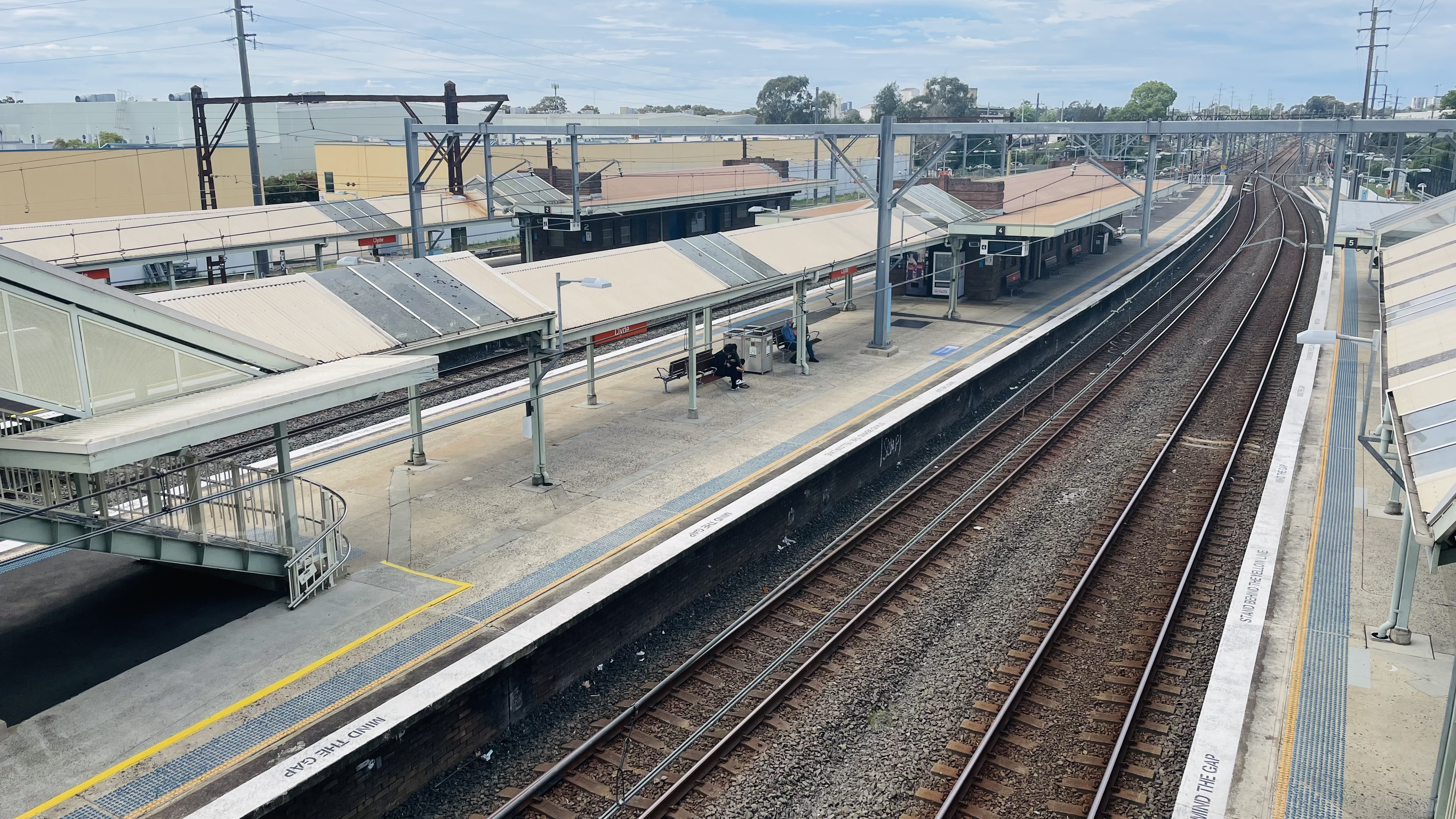
- Eastbound view showing platforms, shelters and buildings in October 2022

General information
- Location: Berry Street, Clyde; Sydney, New South Wales; Australia
- Coordinates: 33°50′10″S 151°01′02″E
- Elevation: 10 metres (33 ft)
- Owner: Transport Asset Manager of NSW
- Operator: Sydney Trains
- Line: Main Suburban
- Distance: 20.66 km (12.84 mi) from Central
- Platforms: 6 (3 island), 2 disused
- Tracks: 7

Construction
- Structure type: Ground
- Accessible: No

Other information
- Status: Weekdays: Staffed: 6am–10pm: Weekends and public holidays: Staffed: 6am–10pm
- Station code: CYE
- Website: Transport for NSW

History
- Opened: 1882 (144 years ago)
- Rebuilt: 1959 (67 years ago)
- Electrified: Yes (from 1928)
- Former names: Rosehill Junction (1882–1883); Clyde Junction (1901–1904)

Passengers
- 2025: 512,955 (year); 1,405 (daily) (Sydney Trains)
- Rank: 160

Services
Preceding station	Sydney Trains	Following station
Granville towards Penrith	North Shore & Western Line Weekday limited and weekends only	Auburn towards Berowra
Granville towards Parramatta or Leppington	Leppington & Inner West Line Weekdays only	Auburn towards City Circle
Former services
Preceding station	Sydney Trains	Following station
Rosehill towards Carlingford	Carlingford Line (1885–2020)	Terminus
Location

Clyde railway station is a suburban railway station located on the Main Suburban line, serving the Sydney suburb of Clyde. It is served by Sydney Trains T1 Western Line and T2 Leppington & Inner West Line services.

== History ==
Clyde station opened in 1882 as Rosehill Junction. It was renamed Clyde on 19 August 1883, Clyde Junction on 1 August 1901, and back to Clyde in April 1904. The station was also rebuilt in 1959.

On 17 November 1888, Clyde became a Junction station with the opening of the Carlingford line to Rosehill. As part of the Parramatta Light Rail project, the Carlingford line closed on 5 January 2020.

== Services ==
=== Platforms ===
Platform	Line	Stopping pattern	Notes
1		not in passenger use, fenced off	
2	North Shore & Western Line	occasional early morning & late night services to Hornsby & Berowra via Central	infrequently used
3	North Shore & Western Line	weekday early morning & late night services to Penrith	infrequently used
4	North Shore & Western Line	weekend services to North Sydney, Chatswood and Lindfield via Central	
4	Leppington & Inner West Line	weekday services to Central & the City Circle	
5	North Shore & Western Line	weekend & late night services to Penrith	
5	Leppington & Inner West Line	weekday services to Leppington & Parramatta	
6		not in passenger use, fenced off used as a headshunt for Auburn stabling yard	

=== Transport links ===
Clyde station is served by two NightRide routes:

- N60: Fairfield station to City (Town Hall)
- N61: Carlingford station to Town Hall station

== Trackplan ==
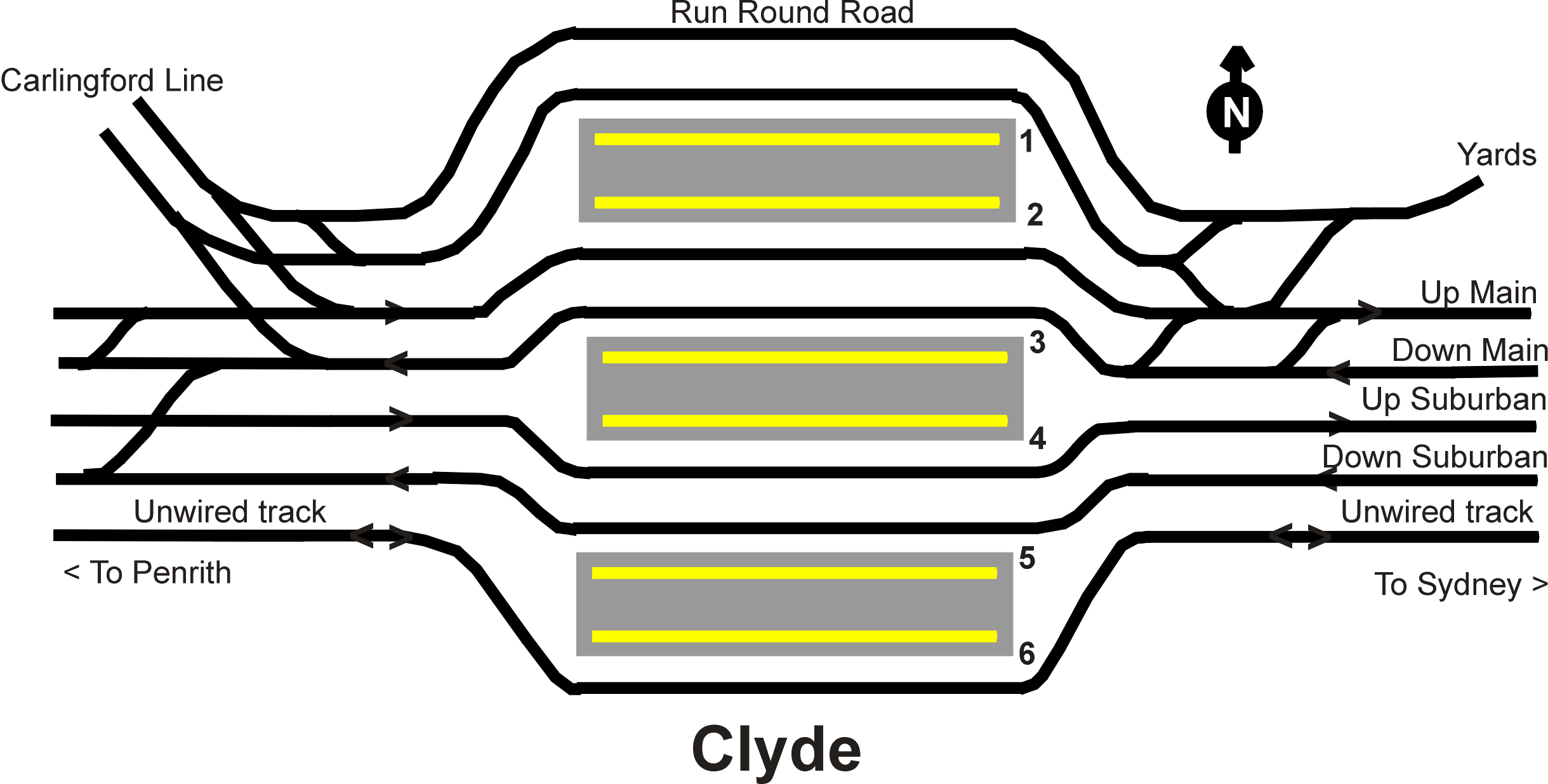
Track arrangement at Clyde. Note: This is the old trackplan. The track beside platform 6 has overhead wires. The tracks leading to the Carlingford Line now end before Parramatta Rd, and are used as a maintenance yard.

== Gallery ==
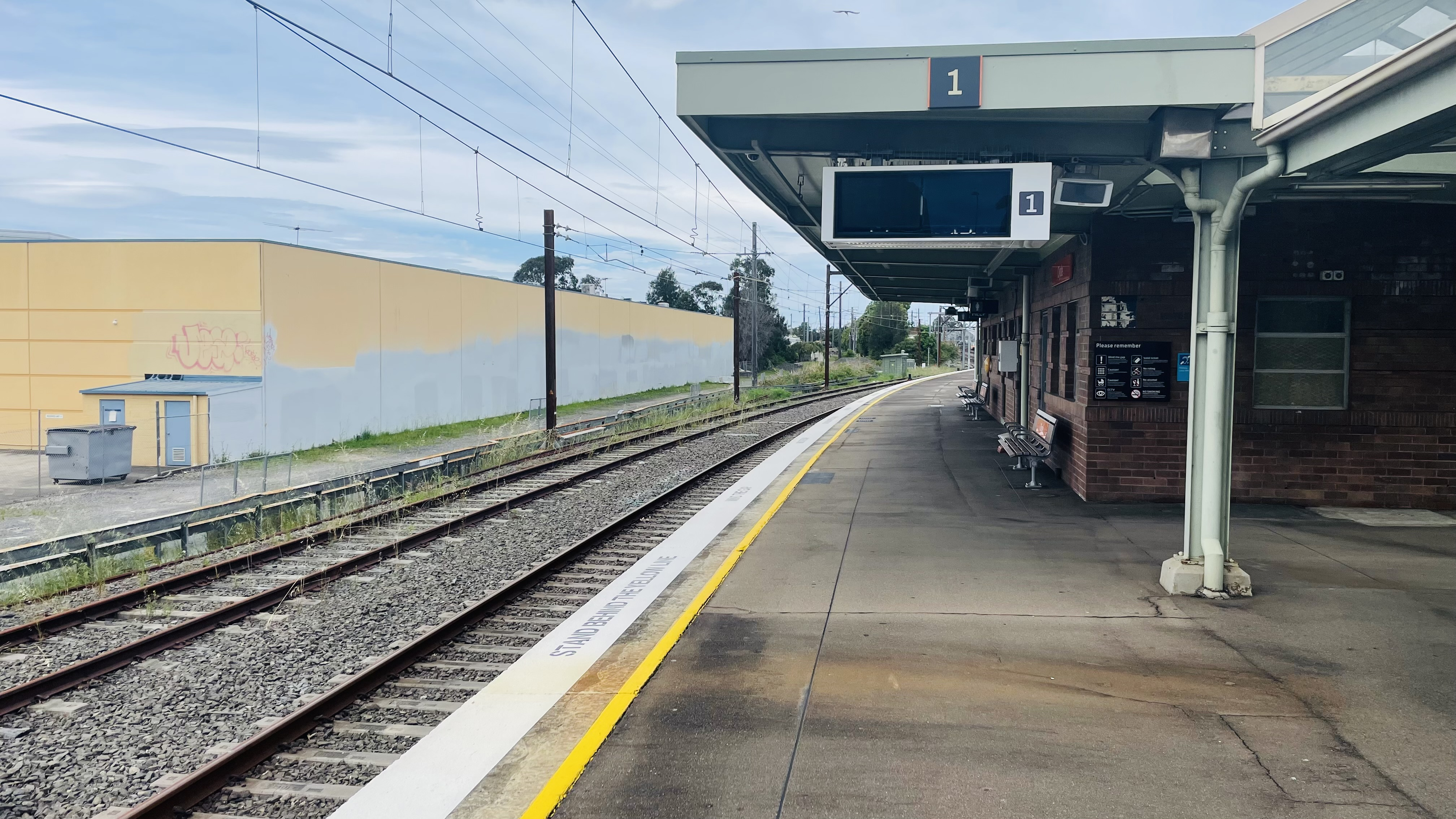
The disused Platform 1, formally serviced by Carlingford Line trains, in October 2022

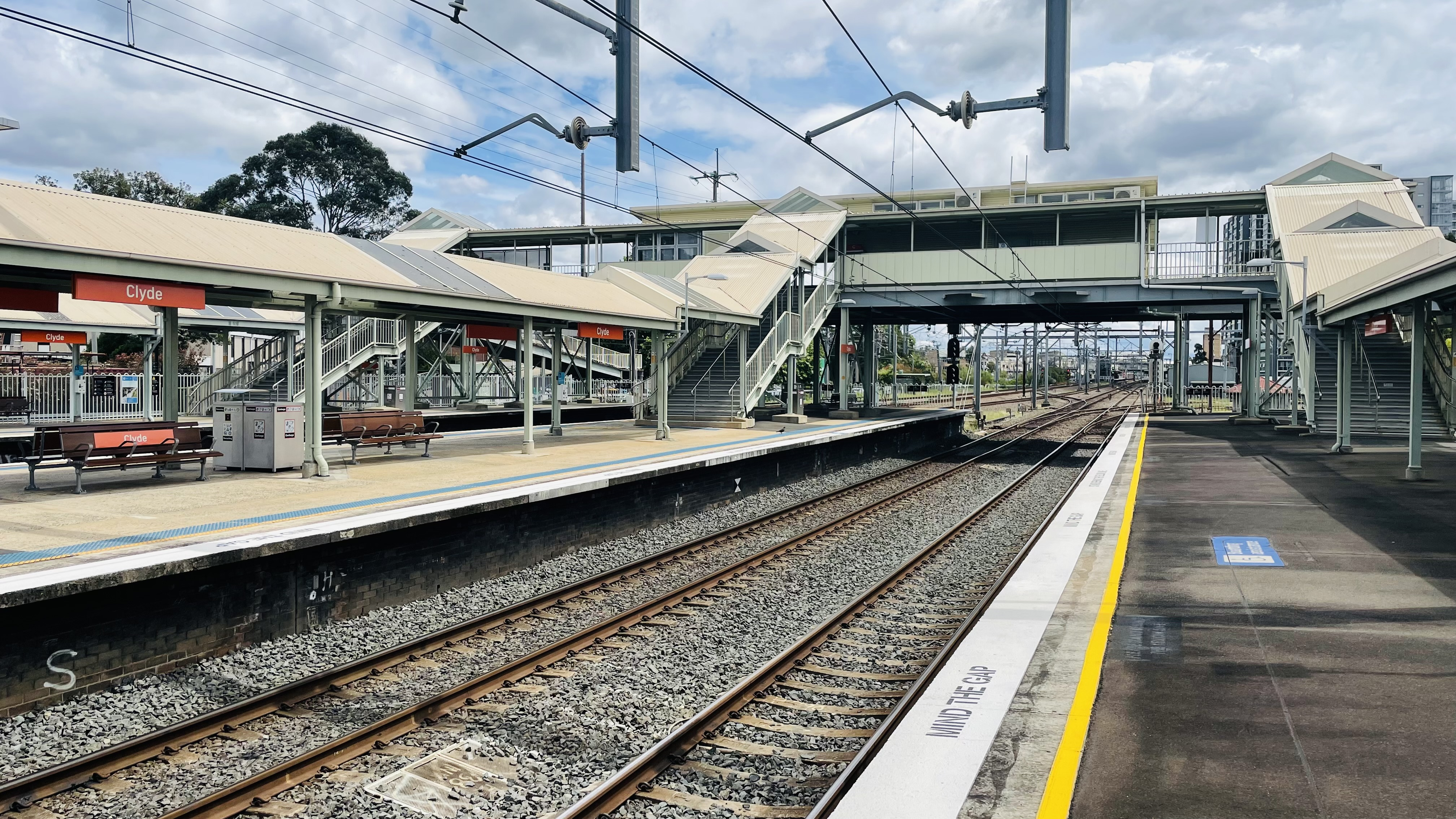
The view towards the concourse from Platform 2 in October 2022
