= Carlingford light rail station =

Light rail station in Sydney, New South Wales, Australia

Carlingford
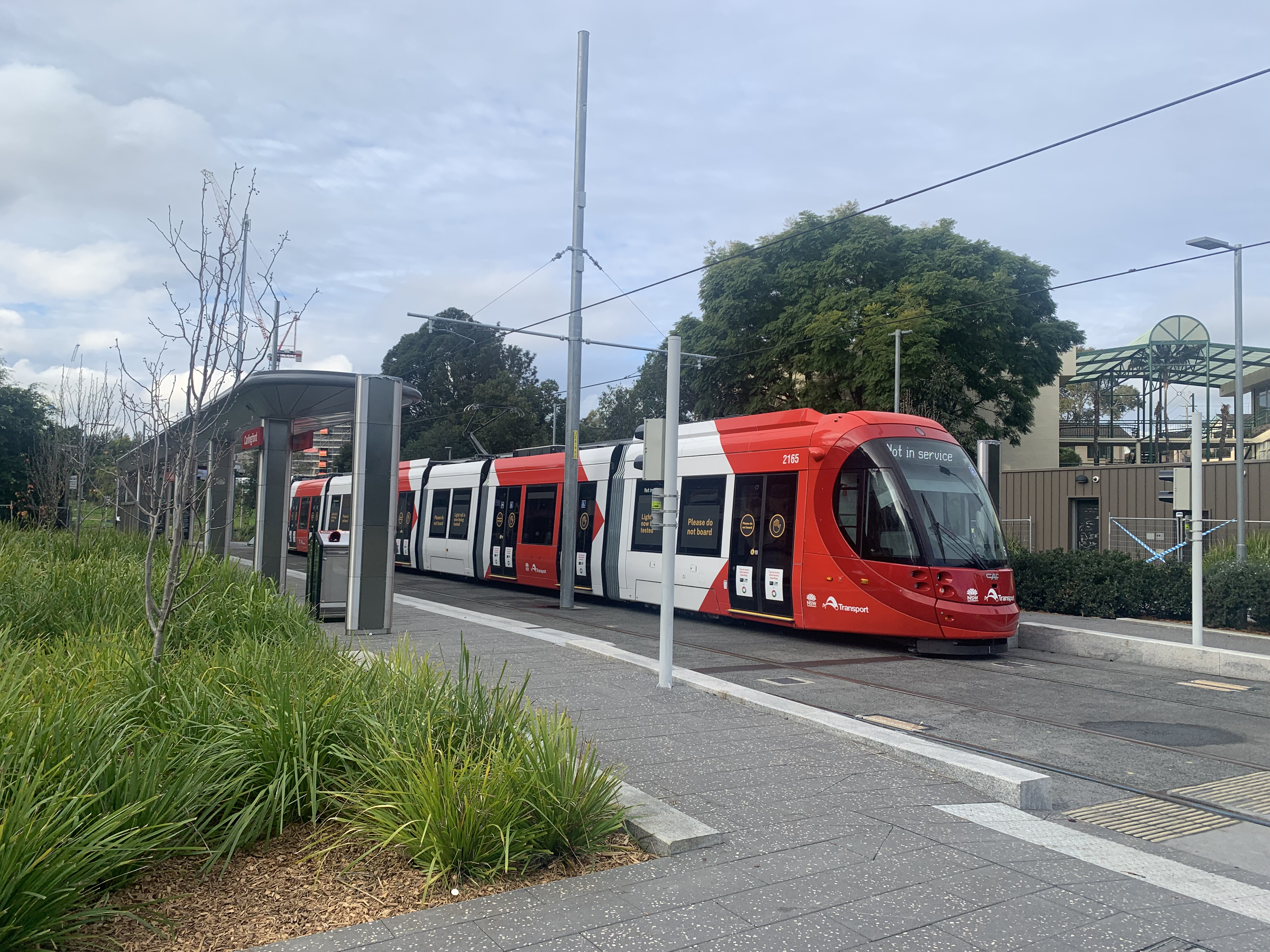
- View of the station during testing, July 2024

General information
- Location: Lloyds Avenue, Carlingford, Sydney, New South Wales; Australia
- Coordinates: 33°46′56″S 151°02′49″E
- Elevation: 104 metres (341 ft)
- Owner: Transport Asset Manager of New South Wales
- Operator: Transdev Australasia
- Line: Parramatta Light Rail
- Platforms: 2 (2 side)
- Tracks: 2
- Connections: Bus

Construction
- Structure type: Ground
- Parking: 22 spaces
- Accessible: Yes

Other information
- Status: Unstaffed
- Website: Carlingford Light Rail

History
- Opened: 20 April 1896 (130 years ago) (as heavy rail); 20 December 2024 (22 months ago) (as light rail)
- Closed: 5 January 2020 (6 years ago) (as heavy rail)
- Rebuilt: 2020–2024
- Former names: Pennant Hills (1896–1901)

Passengers
- 2018: 760 (daily) (Sydney Trains, NSW TrainLink)

Services
Preceding station	Parramatta Light Rail	Following station
Telopea towards Westmead	Westmead & Carlingford Line	Terminus
Former services
Preceding station	Sydney Trains	Following station
Terminus	Carlingford Line (1885–2020)	Telopea towards Clyde
Location

Carlingford light rail station is a light rail station and former suburban railway station located on the Parramatta Light Rail, serving the Sydney suburb of Carlingford. It is served by Sydney Light Rail L4 Westmead & Carlingford line services.

It originally opened in 1896 as the terminus of the Carlingford line and was served by suburban services. Before conversion to light rail, it was served by Sydney Trains T6 Carlingford line services.

== History ==
Carlingford station was built as the terminus of a new privately owned railway from Rosehill. The Cumberland Argus and Fruitgrowers' Advocate of 12 January 1895 described the plans for the station:

The stations will also be first-class structures. At Cox's at Carlingford there will be approaches to the station on two sides. On the right hand side travelling north will be the main station building, and a covered platform 300 feet long. On the left hand side will be a goods siding. ... All the buildings will be of weatherboard. The plans are all ready, but tenders have not yet been accepted.

The station opened on 20 April 1896 as Pennant Hills, but the line was never used, as the owner had got into financial difficulty. Pennant Hills was supposed to be a temporary terminus, as it was originally intended to extend the line to Dural. The initial section of line was eventually taken over and upgraded by the government. It opened for traffic on 1 August 1901 and the Pennant Hills station was renamed Carlingford. After the government took control of the line, it directed the Public Works Committee to conduct an investigation into the value of the Dural extension. The committee ultimately decided not to support construction of the extension.

The Carlingford Produce Store is located adjacent to the station. It included facilities to load grain onto railway wagons. Some of this infrastructure is still extant today. A large amount of land lies behind the station, originally reserved for future extensions of the line.

The brick building on the platform was built in 1978 after the original steam era structure was destroyed by fire.

=== Parramatta Rail Link ===
A major development of Carlingford station – and the Carlingford line – was proposed as part of the Parramatta to Chatswood Rail Link project. The Epping to Parramatta section of the project was postponed indefinitely in 2003 by then-New South Wales Transport Minister Michael Costa citing a lack of projected passenger numbers and economic viability.

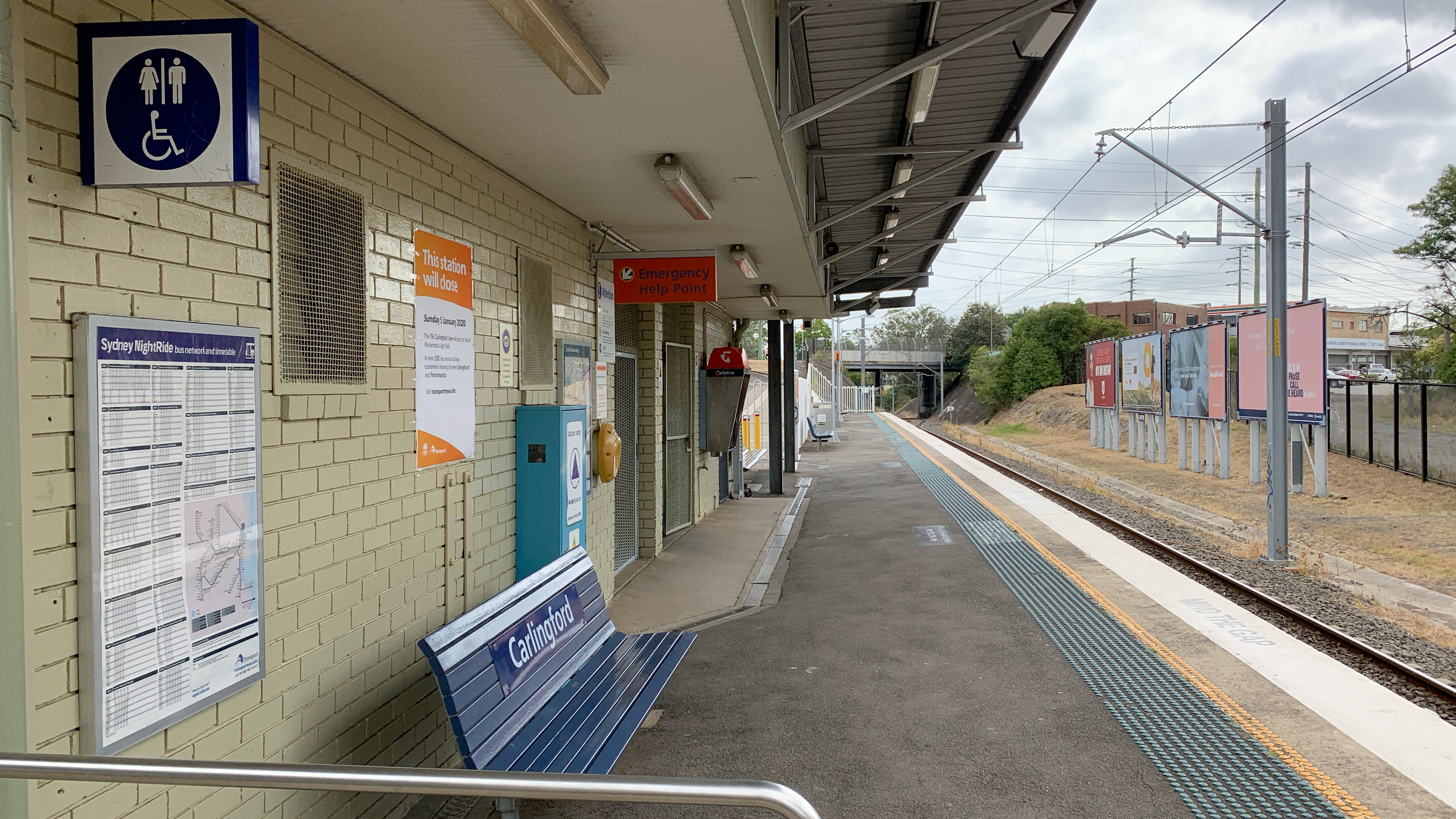
Southbound view from the original railway platform in December 2019

However, on 11 August 2010, the federal Labor Party promised $2.6 billion towards a revival of the project, as part of the party's successful campaign to retain government at that year's election. Carlingford would have been rebuilt as an underground station. Work was due to start in 2011, with a projected 2017 finish, but the NSW Liberal Government cancelled the project, instead requesting that Federal funding be diverted to an upgrade of the Pacific Highway. The Federal Government responded by revoking the funding altogether.

=== Conversion to light rail ===
The Carlingford railway line closed on 5 January 2020 with the original station demolished in May 2020, and rebuilt as a light rail station. The station reopened on 20 December 2024 along with Stage 1 of the Parramatta Light Rail.

== Services ==
=== Platforms ===
The station is served by light rail as follows:

Line	Stopping pattern	Notes
Parramatta Light Rail	services to Westmead & Carlingford	

At the time the station closed to suburban services, it was served as follows:

Platform	Line	Stopping pattern	Notes
1	T6	Terminating services to and from Clyde	

=== Transport links ===
Carlingford station is served by one NightRide route:

- N61: to Town Hall station
