= Vineyard Creek (New South Wales) =

Vineyard
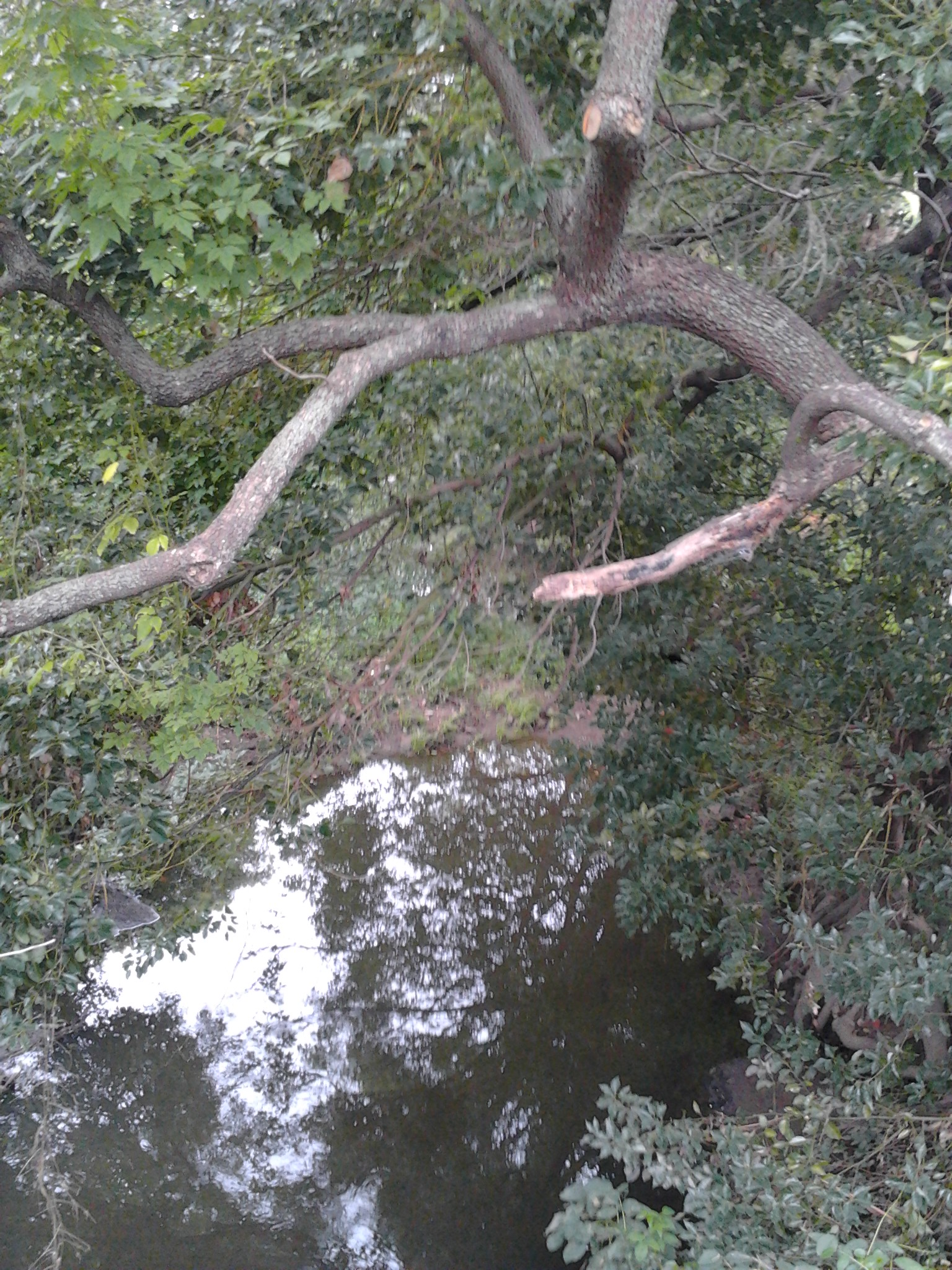
- Vineyard Creek flowing south from Victoria Road, Rydalmere

- Location of the mouth in Sydney

Location
- Country: Australia
- State: New South Wales
- Region: Sydney Basin (IBRA)
- Local government areas: City of Parramatta

Physical characteristics
- Source: Elizabeth Macarthur Park
  - location: Oatlands
  - coordinates: 33°47′36″S 151°2′22″E
- Mouth: Parramatta River
  - location: Rydalmere
  - coordinates: 33°48′53″S 151°1′36″E
- Length: 4 km (2.5 mi)
- Basin size: 420 km^{2} (160 sq mi)

Basin features
- River system: Parramatta River

Vineyard Creek, a northern tributary of the Parramatta River, is a creek in Sydney, New South Wales, Australia. It is located on the lands of the Barramutta people of the Darug nation.

== History and ecology ==
The creek takes its name from the fourth land grant in the colony of New South Wales which was made to Phillip Schaeffer. Schaeffer created a property called 'The Vineyard'. After a succession of owners the property was purchased by Hannibal Macarthur in 1813. Macarthur built a mansion called 'The Vineyard' on the land in 1836.

The creek is approximately 4 kilometres (2.5 mi) long, with a catchment area of 420 hectares (1,000 acres), and is located in the Rydalmere area. The source of the creek is Elizabeth Macarthur Park, Oatlands, where it flows south through Dundas, before reaching the Parramatta River at Rydalmere.

The catchment is predominantly urban, comprising residential, commercial and industrial developments. In its upper reaches, the catchment is steeply graded with narrow valleys spilling out to a wider floodplain downstream of Victoria Road. It is tidal for a distance of approximately 170 metres (560 ft) upstream from its junction with the Parramatta River. Vineyard Creek enters the Parramatta River from the north and to the east of the Rydalmere campus of the University of Western Sydney.

The tidal limit of Vineyard Creek is located 300 metres (980 ft) upstream of the Parramatta River. The mangrove limit is located 20 metres (66 ft) upstream of the pipeline crossing.

== See also ==
- Subiaco Creek
- List of rivers of New South Wales (L-Z)
