= Ponds and Subiaco Creek =

Ponds/Subiaco
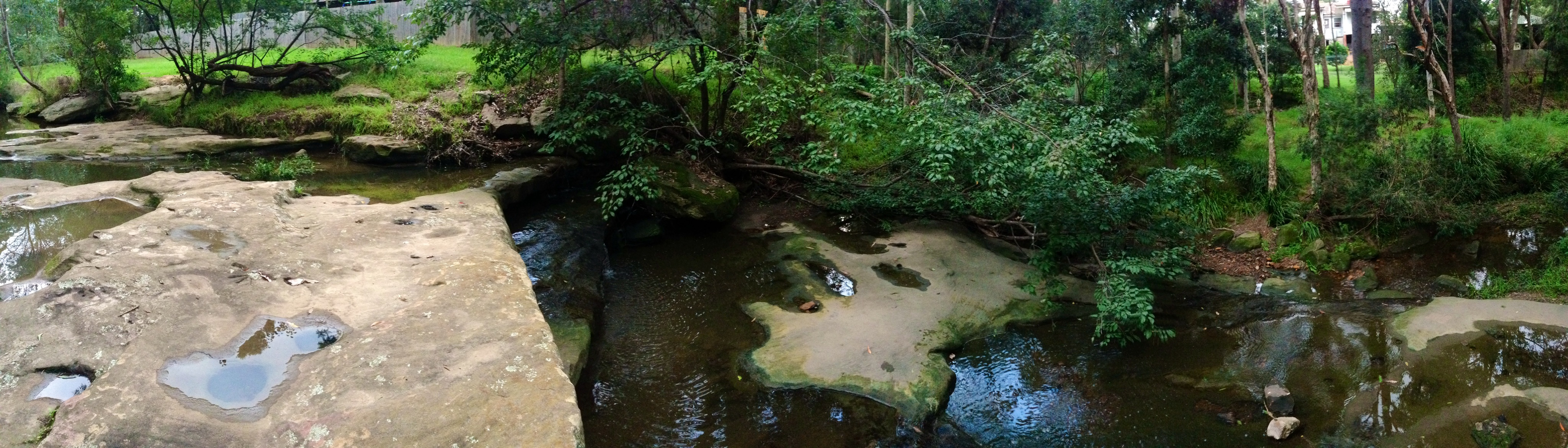
- Rock Feature at the Ponds leg of the creek

Location
- Country: Australia
- State: New South Wales
- Region: Northern Suburbs
- District: Parramatta City
- Municipality: Sydney

Physical characteristics
- Source
  - location: Carlingford and Ermington
  - coordinates: 33°48′41″S 151°3′23″E
- Mouth: Parramatta River
  - location: Rydalmere
  - coordinates: 33°48′59″S 151°1′52″E
- Length: 7 km (4.3 mi)

Basin features
- River system: Parramatta River
- Tributaries
  - left: Vineyard Creek
  - right: The Ponds Creek, Iona Creek

Ponds/Subiaco Creek, a joint northern tributary of the Parramatta River, is a creek north-west of Sydney Harbour, located in the Northern Suburbs region of Sydney, New South Wales, Australia. The creek is also known as The Ponds and the Subiaco Creek respectively. It is followed by a walking track known as 'The Ponds Walk'.

== The Ponds Walk ==
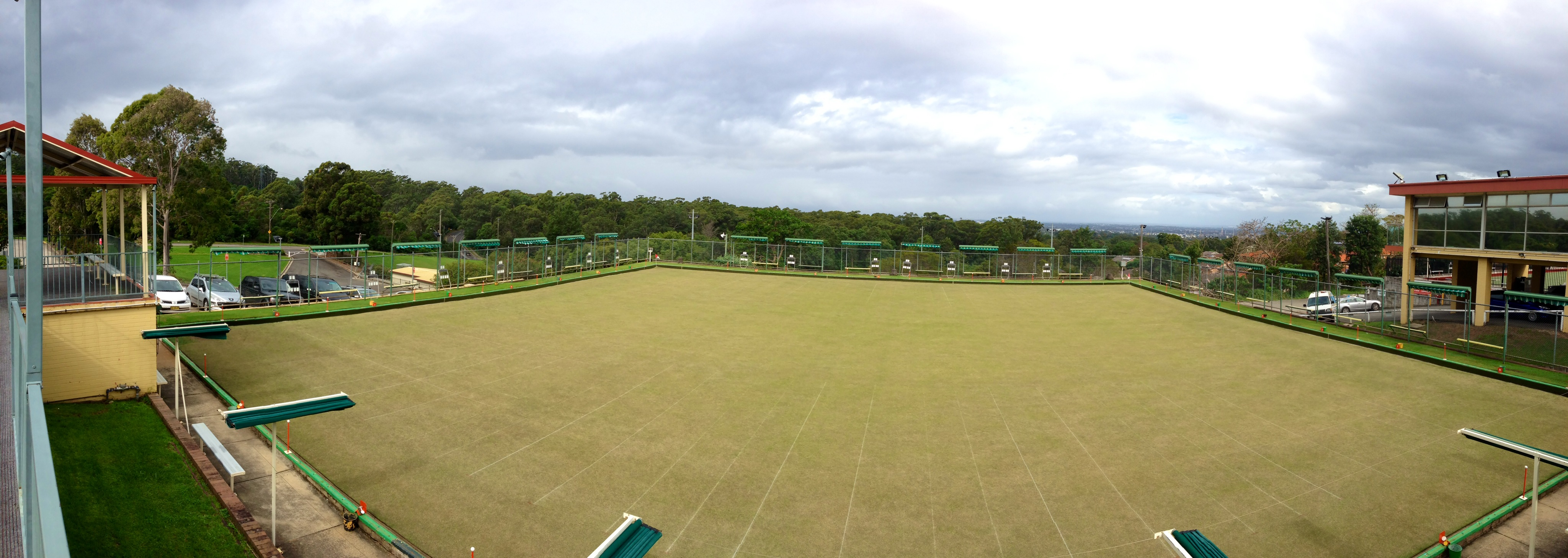
The Ponds Walk and Galaringi Reserve from Carlingford Bowling Club

The Ponds Walk is a 7.7-kilometre walking track which follows The Ponds Creek from Eric Mobbs Memorial Park to Jim Crowgey Reserve lining the Subiaco Creek. The track passes through Carlingford, Dundas Valley, Telopea, Dundas, Ermington and Rydalmere. Leashed dogs are permitted on the walk.

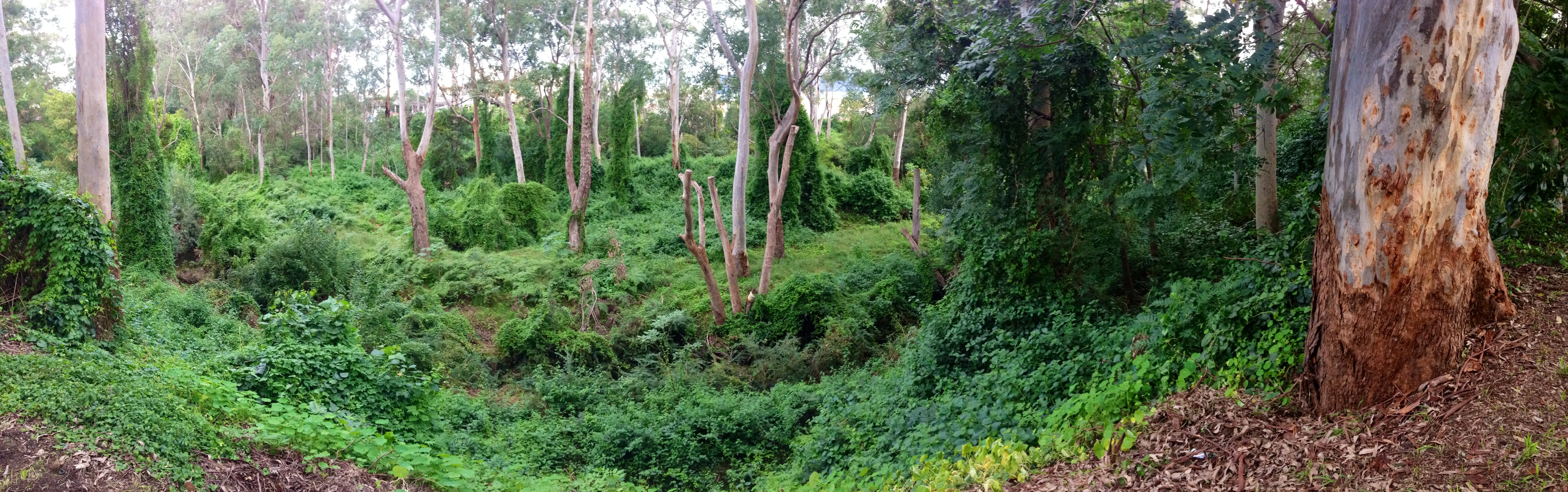
Subiaco Creek leg of The Ponds Walk

== Ecology ==
The Ponds Creek is a tributary of Subiaco Creek, having its source in Carlingford and flowing through Dundas Valley. Flora and Fauna blossom in the Ponds, including Sydney exclusive species of birds and trees. It is also the home of turtles, ducks, rabbits and snakes. It has been deduced that the vegetation of the Ponds Subiaco Creek is Blue Gum High Forest and Sydney Turpentine-Ironbark Forest, meaning protection and plan of action is required to maintain this rarity. It has been classified as critically endangered under the New South Wales government's Threatened Species Conservation Act 1995.

An additional source of Subiaco Creek is in the suburb of Ermington. The creek then flows westwards though Rydalmere before turning south for a short distance and draining into the Parramatta River. It is approximately 5 kilometres (3.1 mi) long.

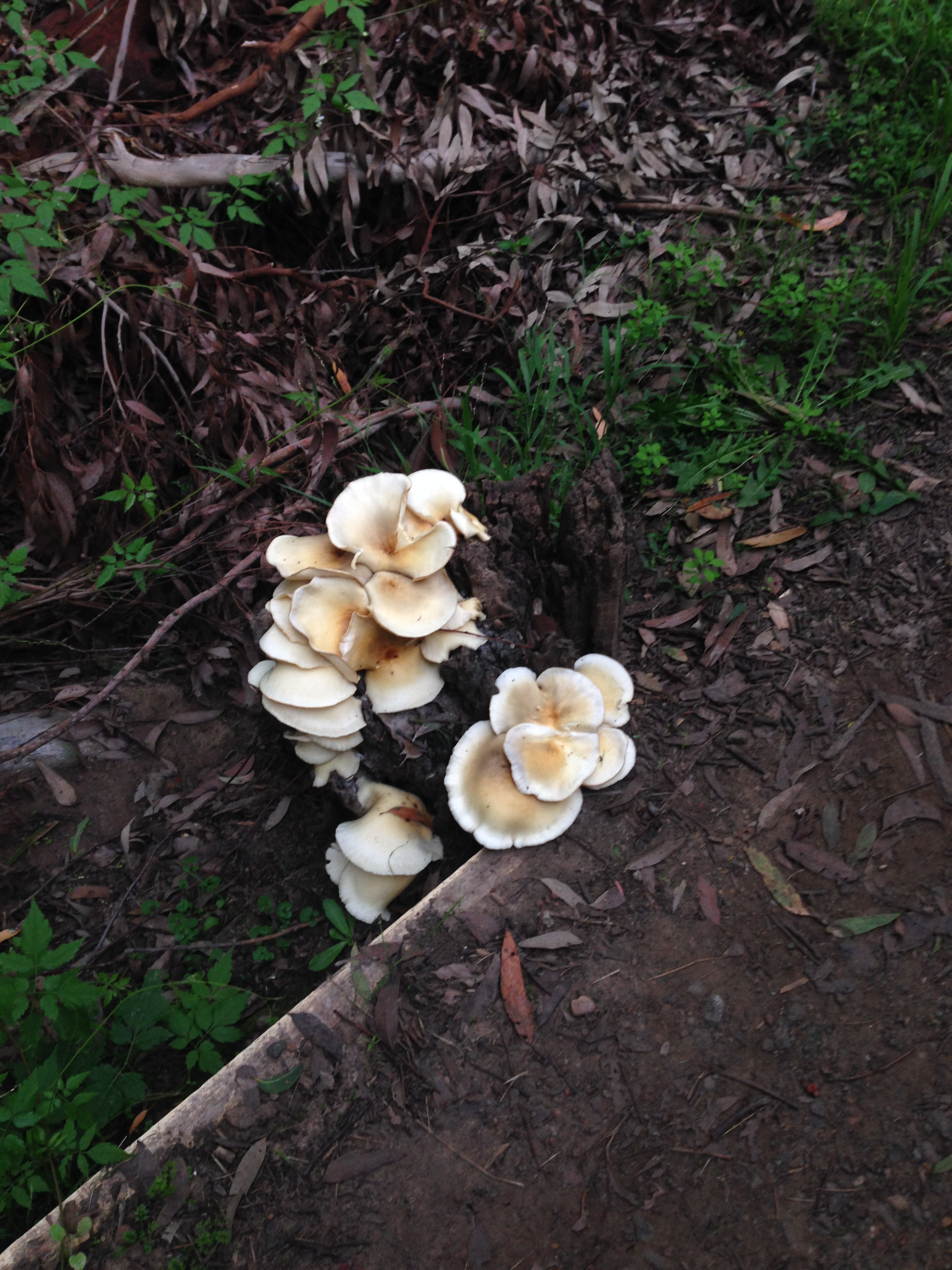
Mushrooms growing along The Ponds Walk

Bird life include the White-faced Heron, Wood Duck, Pacific Black Duck, Australian White Ibis, Laughing Kookaburra, Sulphur-Crested Cockatoo, Galah, Magpie, Noisy Mynah, Raven Rainbow Lorikeet and King Parrot.

== History ==
The Ponds was the name given to a chain of freshwater ponds which formed the headwaters of the Ponds Creek. They were described in 1789 by Lieutenant-General Watkin Tench, who wrote "the Ponds, a name which I suppose it derived from several ponds of water".

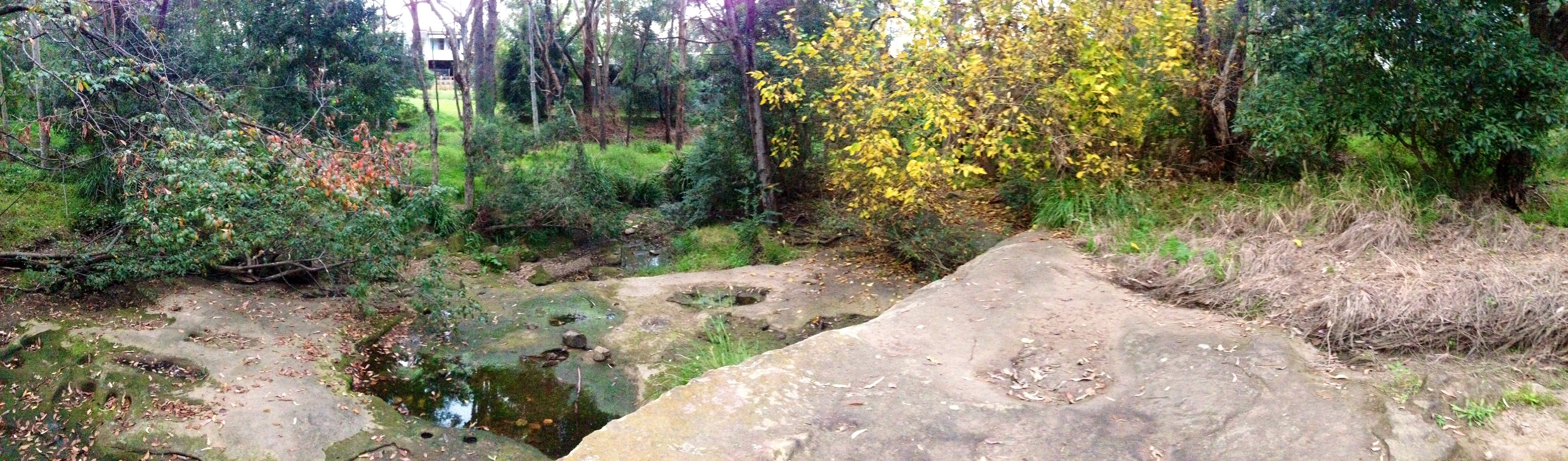
Autumn in The Ponds Walk

Subiaco Creek flows through one of the earliest areas settled by European colonists in Australia. It was site of the fourth land grant in the colony of New South Wales which was made to Phillip Schaeffer. As a consequence, the creek was known as Schaffers Creek. Schaeffer created a property called 'The Vineyard'. This name is commemorated by Vineyard Creek to the west of Subiaco Creek. After a succession of owners the property was purchased by Hannibal Macarthur in 1813. Macarthur built a mansion called 'The Vineyard' on the land in 1836.

This mansion later became a Benedictine convent and boarding school for girls. The nuns named the school 'Subiaco', after the Italian town of Subiaco in which Saint Benedict established his religious order.

== Geography ==
Much of the length of Subiaco Creek has been contained within a network of reserves and parks. The art historian Bernard Smith recounts memories of picking "great bunches of wildflowers" along Subiaco Creek in his youth. Some sections of the creek near Cowells Lane Reserve have been placed in culverts and covered over.

== See also ==
- Vineyard Creek
- Parramatta River
