= Philip Khoury =

Philip Khoury may be:

- Philip S. Khoury (born 1949), American historian and university official
- Philip Khoury (chef), (born 1989/1990), Australian pastry chef
