= Ben Swane =

Australian nurseryman (1927–2020)

- Born: Edgar Norman Swane; 17 November 1927; Sydney
- Died: 15 January 2020 (aged 92); Sydney, Australia
- Education: Newington College; Sydney Technical College
- Occupation: Nurseryman
- Spouse: Suzanne (Sue)
- Children: Robert, Philip, Elizabeth & Marianne
- Website: Vale Ben Swane

Ben Swane AM (17 November 1927 – 15 January 2020), was an Australian nurseryman and media personality.

== Biography ==
Swane was one of five children born in Sydney, to Phyllis Gwendoline (née Rayner) and Edgar Norman Swane. Gwen and Ted as the Swanes were known had five children. The eldest was Valerie Swane OBE, followed by Ben, Josie, Elwyn and Geoffrey. Their English-born grandfather Edgar Swane (1850–1927) had settled at Ermington. A pillar of the Presbyterian Church he became mayor and then town clerk of that suburban municipality. His sons Ted and Harold established Swane Bros Enterprise Nursery in Ermington in 1919 after active service in World War One. Initially, the nursery sold citrus but would later become renowned for growing roses. Ted became its sole owner in 1926. His son Ben found a passion for plants during his high school years at Newington College in the 1940s where he rowed and sang in the choir. He later studied at Sydney Technical College and received his horticulture certificate in 1947. In 1958 Swane and his siblings became shareholders of Swane Bros. Pty Ltd with their father continuing to manage the business for some time. The nursery remained in Ermington until the mid-1960s, when land was purchased at nearby Dural. The Swane family remained proprietors of Swane's Nurseries in Dural until 2000. Swane was for thirty years a gardening presenter on 702 ABC Sydney.

== Honours ==
- Member of the Order of Australia for service to horticulture and to business, to the development and promotion of the Australian native plants export trade, and through executive roles with a range of industry-based organisations
- Graham Gregory Medal for outstanding contribution to the Australian horticultural industry
