= George Kendall Riverside Park =

Park in Sydney, Australia

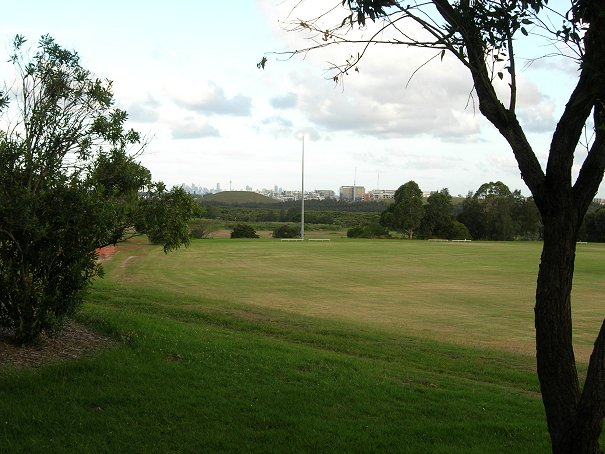
- George Kendall Riverside Park, facing East
- Interactive map of George Kendall Riverside Park
- Type: Municipal (City of Parramatta)
- Location: Ermington, New South Wales
- Coordinates: 33.8213°S 151.0642°E
- Area: 27.2 hectares (67 acres)
- Operator: City of Parramatta
- Parking: Off-street parking

George Kendall Riverside Park is a 27.2-hectare (67-acre) recreational park in Ermington, New South Wales, on the northern bank of the Parramatta River.

The park is named after George Frederick Kendall, an alderman of the Ermington/Rydalmere Municipality from 1944–1948.

== Previous use ==
During the 1970s, to the chagrin of the local residents, much of the area (then called George Kendall Reserve) was used as a landfill site. Eventually the operation was decommissioned and the site revegetated.

== Sports ==
George Kendall Riverside Park is a popular sporting venue. It has the following sports facilities:

- Bike/walking track
- Association football fields
- Baseball field
- Cricket pitch
- Tennis courts
- Basketball/netball courts

George Kendall Riverside Park is the home ground of Ermington United Soccer Club.

== Amenities ==
George Kendall Riverside Park is also a popular picnicking venue. It has the following amenities:

- Playgrounds
- Electric barbecues
- Public toilets
- Off-street parking

== Flora and fauna ==
George Kendall Riverside Park is an important habitat for flora and fauna. The riverside is occupied by mangroves and a saltmarsh with patches of vulnerable narrow-leafed Wilsonia (Wilsonia backhousei). Elsewhere in the park are the Sydney peppermint (Eucalyptus piperita), brush box (Lophostemon confertus), red-stemmed wattle (Acacia myrtifolia) and kangaroo grass (Themeda australis). The park is also home to common weeds such as farmers friend (Bidens pilosa) and purpletop (Verbena bonariensis).

Numerous bird species either live in or visit the park, including the grey butcherbird (Cracticus torquatus), white-faced heron (Egretta novaehollandiae) and the laughing kookaburra (dacelo novaeguineae). The park is also home to common introduced species such as the Indian myna (Acridotheres tristis).

George Kendall Riverside Park has a dedicated bushcare group that includes residents and council members who volunteer to regenerate the native bush. Every third Sunday of the month (except in the heat of summer) the group plants native species and removes weeds. New members are welcome.

== Proposed Upgrades ==
The NSW Department of Planning, Industry and Environment is working with the City of Parramatta Council to upgrade George Kendall Riverside Park as part of Parks for People. The George Kendall Riverside Park upgrade will focus on the eastern side of the park. The makeover aims to create more structure to the park’s different functions but maintain its unique vast open space. Plus, it will enable better access to the riverside bike path. Public comment period ended in July 2020 and a report of results provided. More than 9,300 people visited the site and 239 people shared their ideas on how we can improve George Kendall Riverside Park and make it a better place for the community.

=== Upgrade timeline ===
Late-2020: Design development begins

Mid-2021: Construction begins

Early-2022: Upgrade completed
