= Alexander McDonald (Royal Marines officer) =

Alexander McDonald (c. 1745 – 21 December 1821) was a Royal Marine who came to Australia in the First Fleet. In 1792 he was granted land in present-day Ermington by Governor Arthur Phillip, thus making him among the first land owners in the colony.
