= Rydalmere =

- Suburb
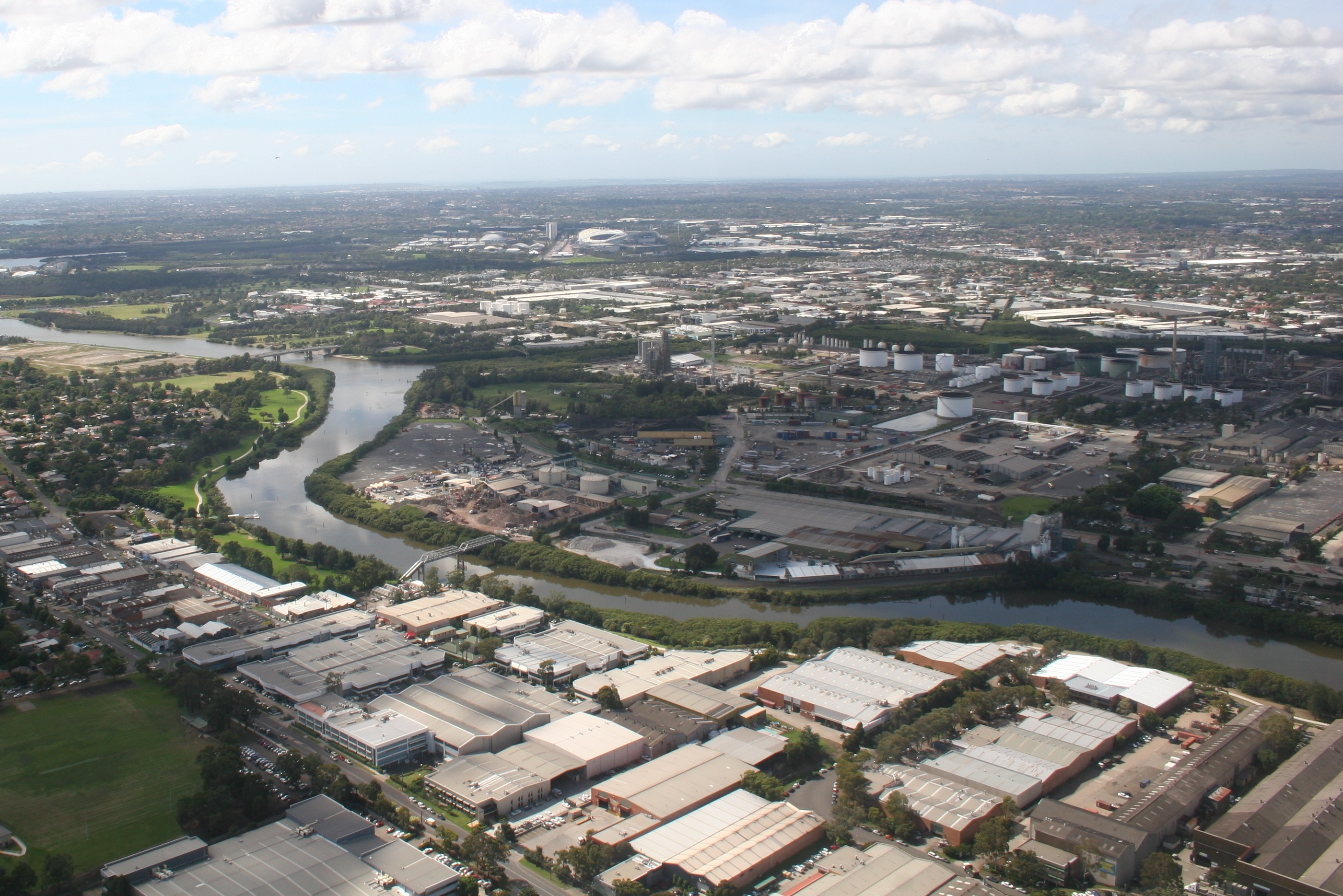
- Aerial view of Rydalmere and the Parramatta River

- Interactive map of Rydalmere
- Country: Australia
- State: New South Wales
- City: Sydney
- LGA: City of Parramatta
- Location: 21 km (13 mi) west of Sydney CBD
- Established: 1856

Government
  - State electorate: Parramatta
  - Federal division: Parramatta

Area
  - Total: 2.0479 km^{2} (0.7907 sq mi)
- Elevation: 12 m (39 ft)

Population
  - Total: 7,274 (2021 census)
  - Density: 3,551.9/km^{2} (9,199.5/sq mi)
- Postcode: 2116
- County: Cumberland
Suburbs around Rydalmere
Oatlands	Dundas	Melrose Park
Parramatta	Rydalmere	Ermington
Camellia	Rosehill	Silverwater

Rydalmere (formerly Field of Mars) is a suburb of Sydney, in the state of New South Wales, Australia. Rydalmere is approximately 21 kilometres west of the Sydney central business district in the local government area of the City of Parramatta. Rydalmere is part of the Greater Western Sydney region.

Rydalmere Polka 1886 Anonymous
MIDI version

== History ==
The earliest grant in the area was to Phillip Schaeffer who settled in 1791. The district comprising modern day Rydalmere, Ermington and Dundas was initially called "The Ponds" because of such natural features occurring above Subiaco Creek. Shortly after Schaeffer's, further grants were given to several emancipists, eight marines and two crew of HMS Sirius, on the northern bank of the Parramatta River at Rydalmere and Ermington. By about 1800 "The Ponds" became known as "Field of Mars", presumably because of Mars being the god of war, and the military men that received land grants there. The parish of Field of Mars spread more or less from Parramatta to West Ryde and up to Carlingford and Eastwood. Later on to the north of this area along the Lane Cove River, a Field of Mars Common of 5,000 acres was established. Today's Field of Mars reserve and cemetery are remnants of this common.

=== Aboriginal culture ===
The Darug is the clan name for the indigenous people of the area. The Darug fashioned tools and spears for hunting native animals and collected wild berries and flora as a valuable source of vitamins. The Darug had a close relationship with the river, from which they caught fish, eels, and other food. Their stable bark canoes often carried a small fire in the middle – built on a mound of soil to allow them to cook their catch fresh. 'Firebrand farming' was also practised in the region.

Soon after Governor Phillip's arrival with the First Fleet of convicts from England in 1788, Parramatta was developed as a farming settlement to feed the new English colony. This led to the immediate and tragic displacement of local Aborigines from the land they had lived off for thousands of years.

The introduction of foreign diseases was the most debilitating trend – and many of the Barramatagal clan disappeared in the smallpox epidemic during early European settlement. However against the odds others survived and their descendants live in the region to this day. In the early 19th century, more positive developments occurred and the region became a meeting place for tribes from surrounding regions. An annual feast was held by Governor Macquarie to encourage Aboriginal people to leave their children at a local school, but this focus later shifted to Blacktown area.

=== European settlement ===
Phillip Shaeffers 'Vineyard' grant of 140 acres was followed in 1792 with grants adjoining on the north bank of Parramatta River. These were to ex soldiers and the settlement was called 'Field of Mars'. The grants at modern day Rydalmere were to James Manning, John Carver, John Seymour, William Reid and a second to Phillip Schaeffer. These lots were all 80 acres except for Alexander Mcdonald whose grant at modern Ermington was 130 acres because he was a married man.

=== Subiaco Monastery ===
The first Roman Catholic archbishop of Sydney in Australia, John Bede Polding, had been taught by the nuns of Stanbrook Abbey in England as a little boy. In 1849, he appealed to the abbey to provide nuns for a Benedictine monastery that he was founding on the 600 acres of Hannibal Macarthur's old Vineyard Estate which he had purchased. This was to be named Subiaco after the Italian location where St Benedict, the founder of the Benedictines, had begun monastic life. In response, Dame Magdalen le Clerc was sent to join Sister Scholastica Gregory from Princethorpe Priory, and the two founded what is now Jamberoo Abbey. This left Subiaco in 1957, after the urban development of the locality had become oppressive to the nuns.

=== Thomas O'Neill ===
Rydalmere was named by Thomas O'Neill when he purchased much of the acreage of the Vineyard Estate not occupied by the nunnery, after it was put up for sale through the trustees by the Sydney Roman Catholic diocese in 1877. Despite the myth surrounding O’Neill coming from England’s Cumbrian Lake District, he was born in Tipperary, Ireland in 1830, and accompanied his parents to Australia as a young lad, where he finished his education.

He left for the Californian goldfields in 1849 and returned in 1851, the venture being quite profitable for him. He entered business with much energy and a strong drive which along with sound commercial instincts allowed him to retire a very wealthy man in 1877. Another myth is that O'Neill purchased the Vineyard estate as a speculator in order to quickly sell it and make a healthy profit. After the purchase, he established his "Fairmount Estate" which covered a considerable portion of Rydalmere, the boundaries more or less extending from Park Road (formerly Wharf St) to Spurway Street, the southern boundary being the Parramatta river, and the northern boundary being Subiaco Creek (formerly Bishop’s Creek). It was an orchard and pasture property.

"Fairmount" the family home he built, was said to be a very beautiful residence, and splendid views were to be had from its tower. It has long since disappeared and was thought to have been located near Victoria Road and Gammell Street. The property sales and sub-divisions only occurred slowly, and appear to be a result of either being required for the advancement of the suburb, or the estate being divided over time by roads being established i.e. Victoria Road in 1886, rather than being sold off for a profit.

Thomas O'Neill died on 13 March 1890 at Fairmount aged 59. His funeral service was held in St Mary's Cathedral, and he was buried in Waverley cemetery. He was said to have been a most amiable man, held in high regard by all that knew him. His was deeply involved in not only Irish and Catholic affairs, but public affairs in general. His charity spanned many years with his support of St Vincent's Hospital, The Good Samaritan Refuge and The Benevolent Asylum being on-going. His purse was never closed to charity. His final act before his illness was to donate the land and money to help the establishment of the Catholic church and school at Rydalmere.

He still owned most of his Rydalmere property at the time of his death. Fairmount was later sold by the family and remained an orchard with a few building lots sold. It was not until after World War II, when the Housing Commission acquired it for public housing, that it was fully developed.

O'Neill had owned an estate named Rydalmere, which he had sold years before buying the vineyard estate and must have liked the name which he reused. Exactly where his first Rydalmere property was located is not known.

Rydal Water is a lake in The English Lake District which gains its name from the nearby village of Rydal, and “Mere” is an Old English word meaning "lake", or "body of water".

== Heritage listings ==
Rydalmere has a number of heritage-listed sites, including:

- 171 Victoria Road: Rydalmere Hospital

== Transport ==
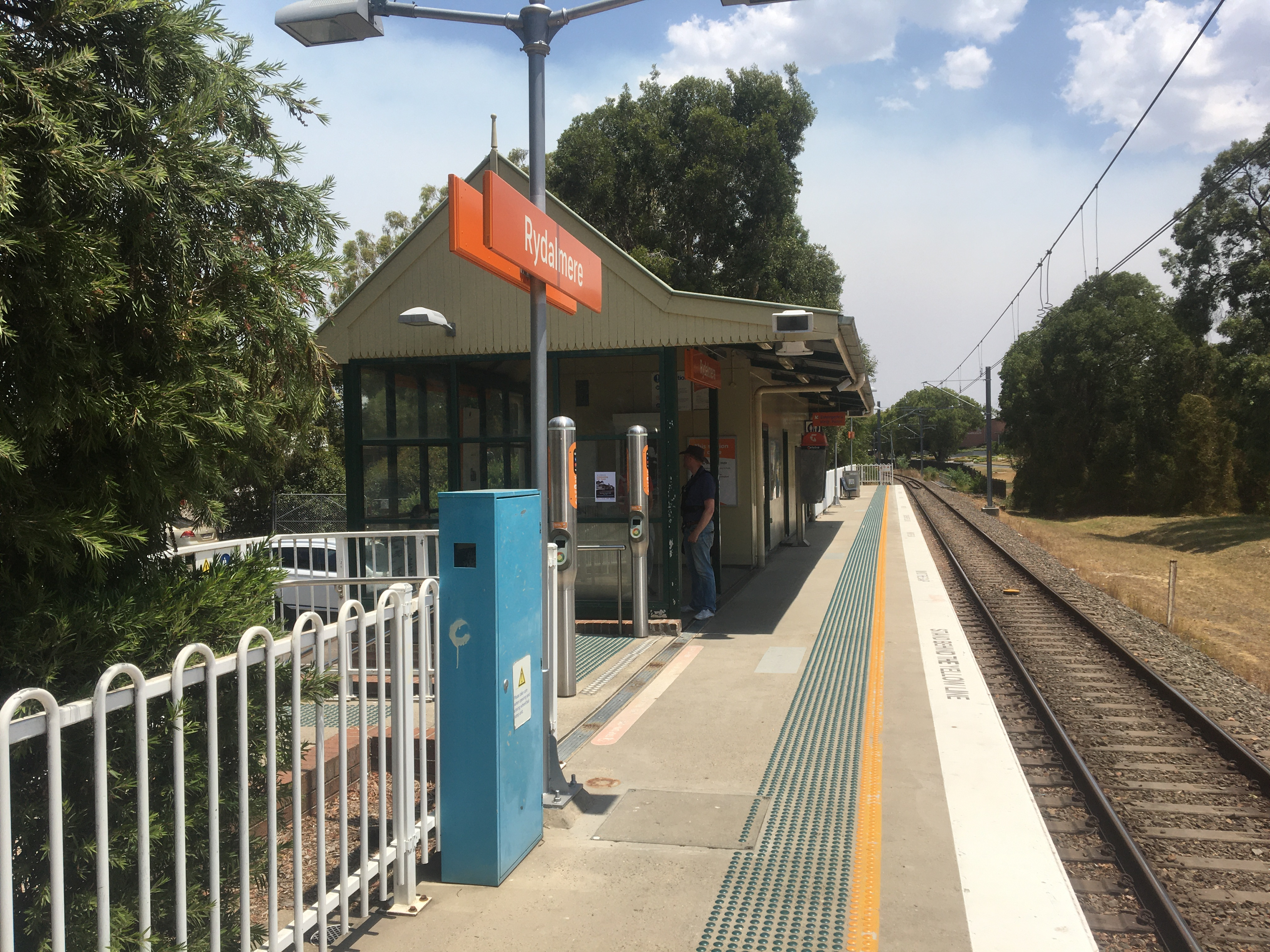
Rydalmere railway station on the last full day of heavy rail service to Carlingford

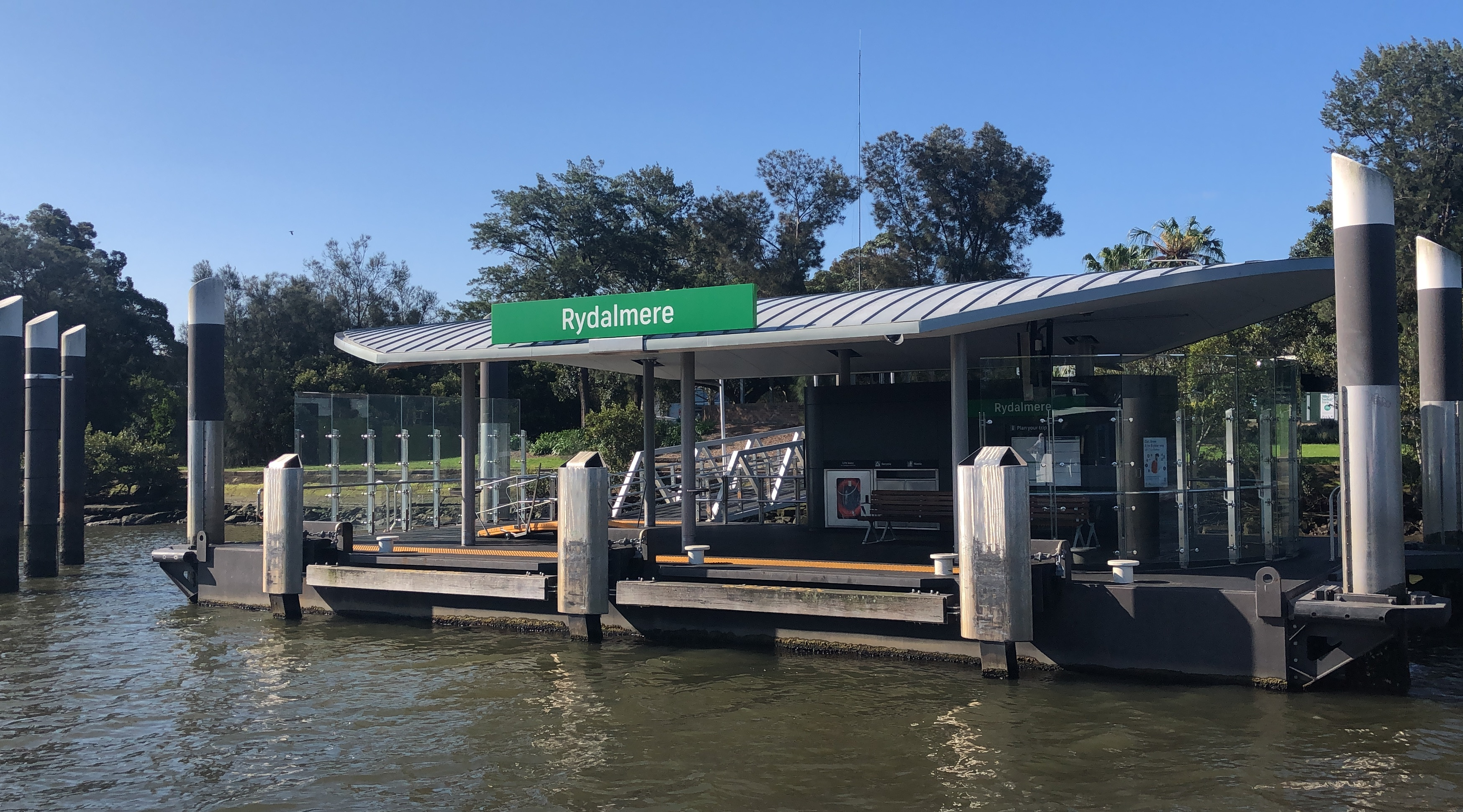
Rydalmere ferry wharf

Rydalmere railway station was located on the former Carlingford line of the Sydney Trains network, which closed on 5 January 2020 for conversion to light rail. The next station to the south was Camellia and to the north was Dundas. A conversion of the Camellia to Carlingford section of the Carlingford railway line to light rail was announced in 2015 as part of the Parramatta Light Rail project. Though originally to run entirely to the south of the Parramatta River, a redesigned second branch of the light rail was announced in 2017. Beginning at Sydney Olympic Park, the line will pass through Rydalmere before joining up with the Carlingford branch at Camellia. If the Camellia option is chosen, a new bridge across the river would be constructed between the two suburbs.

Rydalmere ferry wharf is on Parramatta River and is served by Sydney Ferries's Parramatta River services from Parramatta to Circular Quay. RiverCat catamaran type ferries work the Parramatta River route due to shallow waters, particularly during low tides.

There are five bus routes operated by Busways' Ryde Bus Depot that service the area:

- 500N Overnight Parramatta station – Hyde Park
- 501 Parramatta station – Railway Square
- 523 Parramatta station – West Ryde station
- 524 Parramatta station – West Ryde
- 525 Parramatta station – Strathfield station

Victoria Road (A40) is a major route connecting Parramatta with Anzac Bridge and passes through Rydalmere. Silverwater Road is part of the A6 arterial route between Cumberland Highway at Carlingford and Princes Highway at Heathcote. It intersects with Victoria Road at a flyover interchange on the eastern edge of Rydalmere and crosses the Parramatta River over Silverwater Bridge.

== Commercial areas ==
Rydalmere currently consists of residential and commercial developments. The western side of Rydalmere is commercial consisting primarily of light manufacturing industry and service industries. The eastern side is mainly residential.

== Rydalmere Family Inn ==
In 1886, Thomas O’Neill advertised land on the "Rydalmere" estate. The subdivision was divided into residential blocks, and was bounded by Victoria and Park Roads, and included Pine, Wattle and Myrtle Streets. The sale was hardly a success, though the corner block of Victoria & Park was sold, with building probably commencing that year, and the hotel license being obtained to allow the opening of the "Rydalmere Family Hotel". O’Neill donated the neighbouring land to the Catholic Church and school, while the rest of that subdivision appears to have been purchased by Frederick Randall, the Postmaster. It was known as Randall’s Estate and sold some 30 years later.

The Rydalmere Hotel has a long if interrupted history. Henry Atkins was the first Licensee, but only held it for a short time before transferring the license to Henry Jenkins in March 1887. Mr. Jenkins wasted no time advertising his hotel in the SMH, with the Saturday 26 March edition extolling the virtues to "City Gentleman and Families" of the "comfort and moderate charges at the RYDALMERE FAMILY HOTEL, which is in every sense a country hotel". Disaster struck when Sydney was hit by a storm with gale force winds on Friday 23 September 1892, resulting in the hotel being blown down.

There was even greater excitement in the district on 9 September 1907, when Constable Howard, senior officer of the Dundas district described how he passed through the scrub near the Rydalmere Hotel shortly after mid-day. He inspected the hotel, where everything appeared ok, but then he heard noises and talk coming from the Catholic Church next-door, indicating illegal drinking taking place. Waiting at the door, he attempted to detain a person as they were leaving, but was dragged into the building where he received a fearful beating and kicking from four men. He drew his revolver and fired, wounding a man. The four men arrested were Thomas Millane (the wounded Licensee of the Rydalmere Hotel), Michael Millane (his brother), Michael Murphy (caretaker of the church) and George Workman.

The hotel continued trading with a somewhat dubious reputation and ever changing Licensees until 1929, when it was forced to close due to its license being transferred to a Campsie hotel. In 1949 Millers applied to re-license the Rydalmere hotel by transferring the license of the New Langham Hotel in York Street. The Rydalmere Family Hotel was renovated, and additions made to it, so that it was ready for its official opening on 31 December 1949. It is an unusual design, with the double storey section on the eastern side possibly being the original 1892 building, built after the storm. It had a striking appearance of off white, with the lower section having light blue glazed tiles with black tile trim – a cool colour scheme, which on hot days beckons its customers, and very different to the brown tiles of most pubs at the time.

During the 1970s, the colour changed, as did the name, to The Family Inn and it became one of Sydney's leading live music venues.

== Rydalmere Shopping Centre ==
The shopping centre is located on both sides of Victoria Road at the intersection with Park Road. The northern side was constructed in 1959 and is typical of the era. The original shops consisted of Strange's Four Square Food Store, Davy's Pharmacy, McLeay's Hardware, Lorna Beauty Salon, Bambino Children's & Baby Wear, Rydalmere Fish Supply, Rydalmere Milk Bar and Pat Howard Barber & Tobacconist. A weatherboard Post Office building originally stood near the footpath on Victoria Road, but was relocated back near the bank adjacent to the shops in the early 60s.

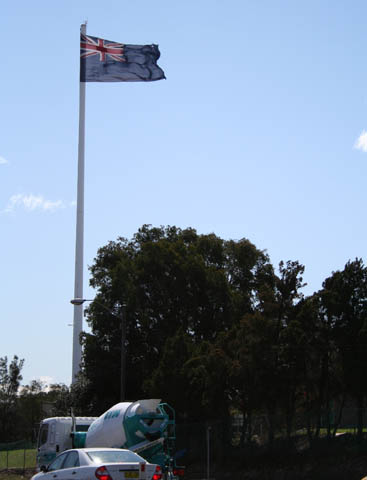
Giant Australian flag on Victoria Road, removed 2011

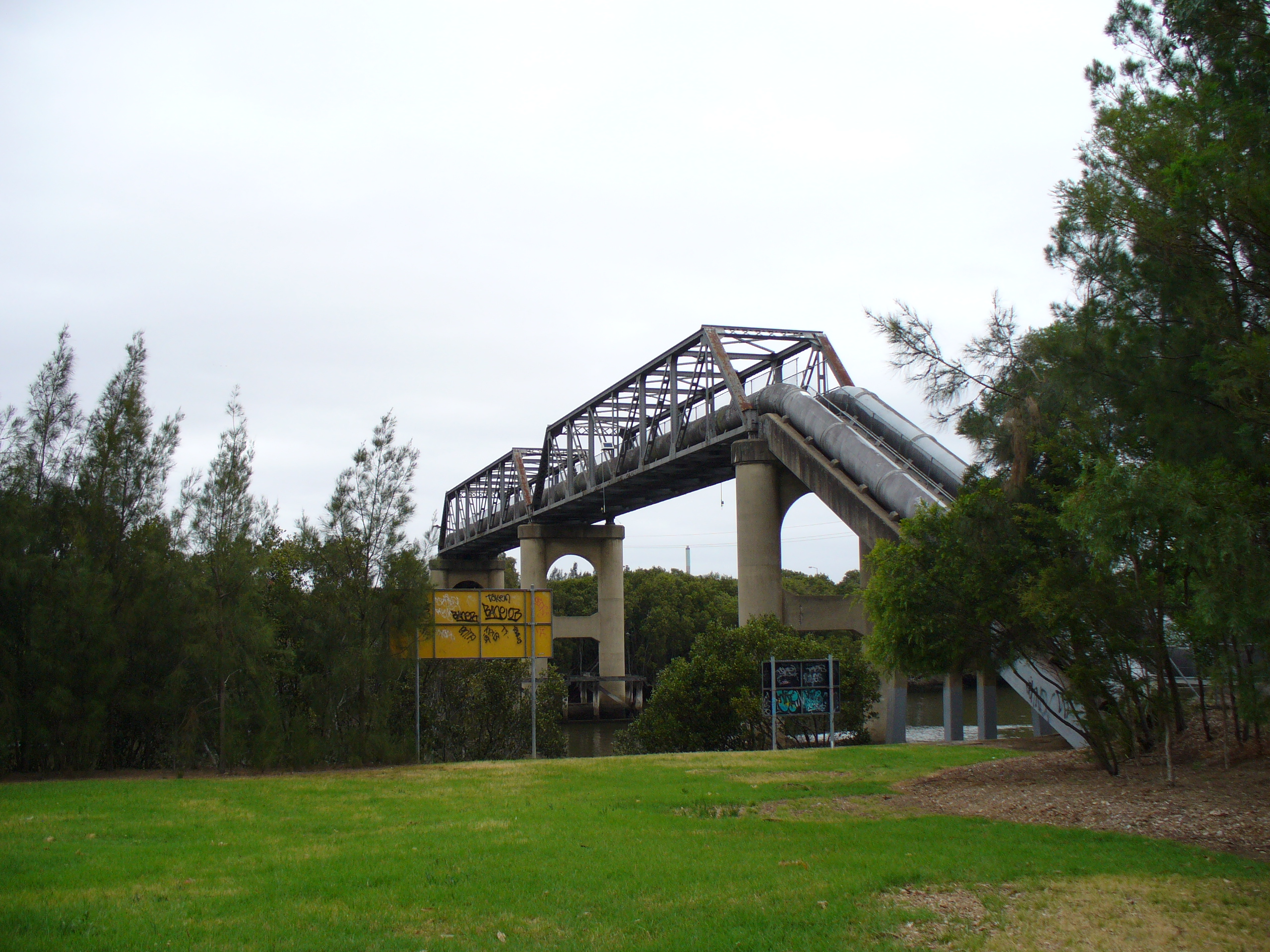
Rydalmere pedestrian bridge over the Parramatta River

== Landmarks ==
- Holy Name of Mary Roman Catholic Church
- Female Orphan School
- Waterpipe and Pedestrian Bridge over Parramatta River
- Subiaco Creek
- Vineyard Creek

== Schools ==
- Rydalmere Public School
- Western Sydney University "Parramatta" Campus
- St Marys Catholic School

== Parks ==
- Crowgey Street Reserve
- Eric Primrose Reserve
- John Carver Reserve
- Rydalmere Park
- Rydalmere section of Parramatta to Putney cycleway
- Rydalmere section of Parramatta River
- Schaeffer Park
- Upjohn Park
- Anderson Park
- Marri Badoo Reserve
- Hannibal Macarthur Park
- Sections of the Ponds Walk

== Organisations ==
- Rydalmere Bowling Club
- Rydalmere Cricket Club
- Rotary Club of Rydalmere
- 1st Rydalmere Scout Group
- Part of the suburb of Rydalmere lies in the Anglican parish of Dundas/Telopea.

== Sport and recreation ==
- The Rydalmere Cricket Club's team, 'The Mighty Wrens', plays in the Northern Districts Cricket Association (NDCA competition. The Rydalmere and Dundas United Cricket Clubs are a partnership that involves the Rydalmere Cricket Club being responsible for senior cricket teams and Dundas United Cricket Club responsible for developing and fostering junior cricket in the greater Parramatta area.
- Parramatta City FC Blues is the soccer (football) team whose home ground is Eric Primrose Reserve in Rydalmere.

== Demographics ==
At the 2021 census, Rydalmere recorded a population of 7,274. Of these:

- The age distribution was quite similar to the country in general. The median age was 37 years, close to the national median of 38. Children aged 0–14 years made up 19.1% of the population (national average is 18.2%) and people aged 65 years and over made up 13.1% of the population (national average is 17.2%).
- 52.8% of people were born in Australia. The most common countries of birth were China 8.7%, South Korea 5.8%, India 2.5%, Hong Kong 2.2% and Iran 2.0%. 47.4% of people only spoke English at home. Other languages spoken at home included Mandarin 8.5%, Korean 7.7%, Cantonese 6.2%, Arabic 3.6% and Armenian 1.9%.
- The most common responses for religion in Rydalmere were No Religion 29.6%, Catholic 26.0% and Anglican 6.6%.
- The medium household weekly income was $1,871, which is higher than the national average of $1,746.

== Politics ==
In the Australian Parliament, Rydalmere falls within the Division of Parramatta, currently represented by Andrew Charlton, a member of the Australian Labor Party.Charlton was elected at the 2022 Australian federal election.

In the New South Wales Parliament, Rydalmere falls within the Parramatta electorate, currently represented by Geoff Lee, a member of the Liberal Party. Lee was elected to NSW Parliament at the 2011 state election.

Rydalmere falls within the Elizabeth Macarthur Ward of the City of Parramatta local government area.
