= Ermington, New South Wales =

Suburb in Sydney, Australia

Ermington
- Suburb
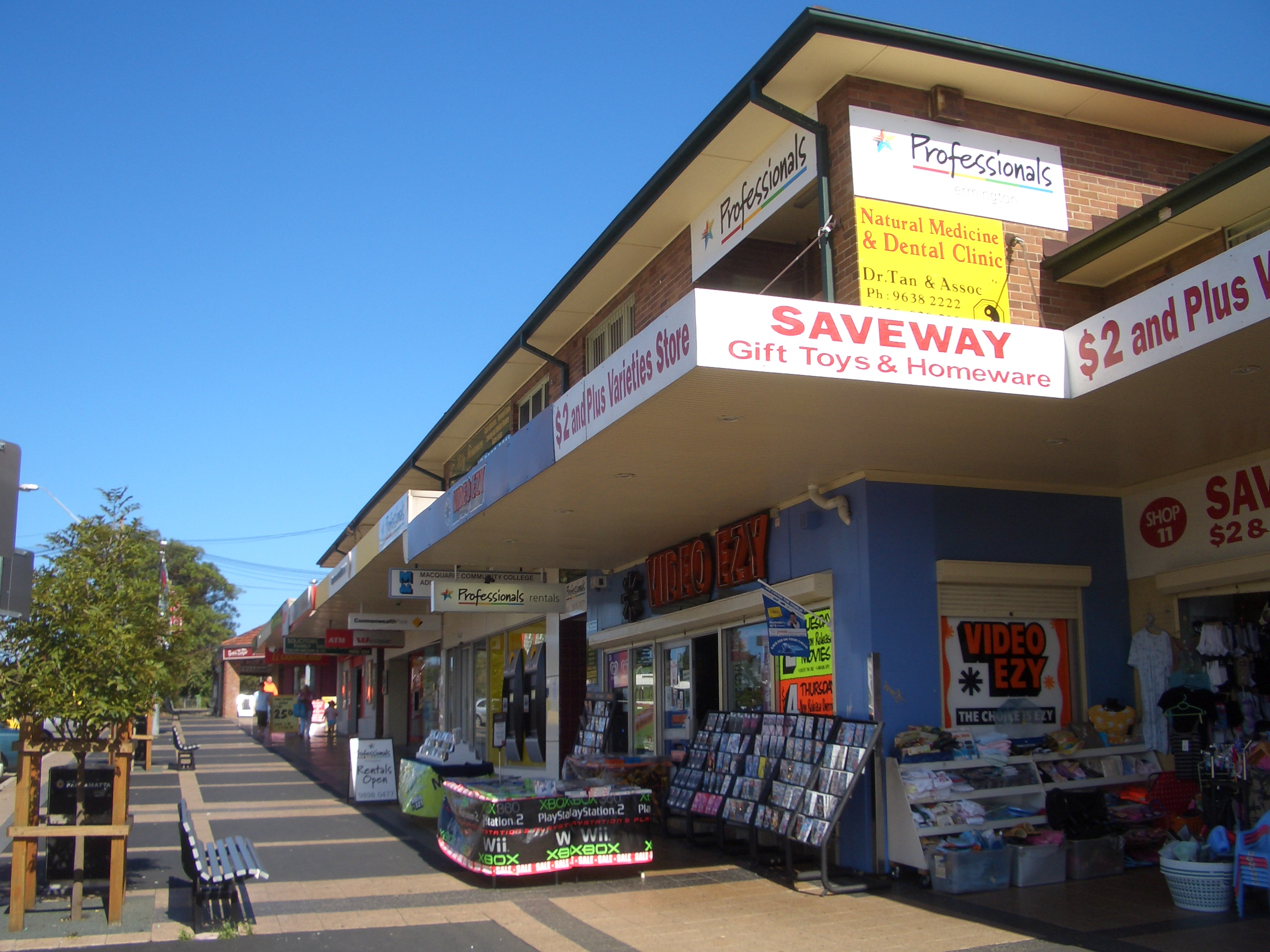
- Ermington shops on Betty Cuthbert Avenue

- Interactive map of Ermington
- Coordinates: 33°48′41″S 151°03′42″E
- Country: Australia
- State: New South Wales
- City: Sydney
- LGA: City of Parramatta
- Location: 19 km (12 mi) north-west of Sydney CBD

Government
  - State electorate: Parramatta
  - Federal division: Parramatta

Area
  - Total: 4.5 km^{2} (1.7 sq mi)
- Elevation: 36 m (118 ft)

Population
  - Total: 12,686 (2021 census)
  - Density: 2,819/km^{2} (7,300/sq mi)
- Postcode: 2115
Suburbs around Ermington
Dundas	Dundas Valley	Eastwood
Rydalmere	Ermington	West Ryde Melrose Park
Silverwater	Newington	Sydney Olympic Park

Ermington is a riverside suburb in the geographical and demographic centre of Greater Sydney, New South Wales, Australia. Ermington is located 15 kilometres from the Sydney central business district, in the local government area of the City of Parramatta. Ermington lies on the northern bank of the Parramatta River.

== History ==
=== Aboriginal culture ===
The area now known as Ermington was associated with the Wallumettagal/Wallumedegal people. References also note that the area had been controlled by the Wongal/Wangal people.

=== European settlement ===
Ermington was originally part of the Field of Mars area. In February 1792, Governor Arthur Phillip granted parcels of land on the northern bank of Parramatta River in the Field of Mars to eight marines: Isaac Archer, John Carver, John Colthread, Thomas Cottrell, James Manning, Alexander McDonald, Thomas Swinnerton and Thomas Tining. Most of the parcels were about 80 acres (320,000 m^{2}) in size, except for McDonald's which was 130 acres (apparently because he was married). The settlers used their land to grow wheat, maize and vegetables.

Alexander McDonald's grant extended northward from Parramatta River to approximately present-day Stevens Street, and westward to present-day Spurway Street. His house is still standing near Parramatta River at 15-17 Honor Street. In 1809 he acquired an extra 40 acres (160,000 m^{2}). He used his land to grow wheat, which he ground, dressed and sold to a baker in Sydney. After McDonald's death, his widow sold part of the land of about 45 acres to Seargent George MacDonald (no relation), who in turn sold it to Henry Bowerman and Charles Campbell.

Bowerman named his estate Marion developing an orchard and vineyard on the land, and he built the Marion homestead on the hill where present-day Rydalmere East Public School with sweeping views of Parramatta River now stands. Mrs Bowerman put the estate up for sale in 1857, though it was 1862 before she actually disposed of it at auction. Jamed Hartwell Williams, a well known colonist and long time American Consul resided at 'Marion' for several years in the early 1870s. The estate passed into the hands of developers in the 1880s who renamed it the 'Broadoaks Estate' and 'Broadoaks House'.

The remainder of McDonald's land was purchased by E. B. Miller, who built Rose Farm in Honor Street.

John Colthread's grant comprised 80 acres (320,000 m^{2}) across present-day Wharf Road. The Police Magistrate to Parramatta, Major Edmund Lockyer, purchased the land in 1827 and built the stone mansion Ermington - named after the parish in Devon, England, where his second wife, Sarah Morris, was born. The house was completed in 1828 and stood near the current Ryde-Parramatta Golf Course. Locker increased his land holdings and by 1830 was grazing 1280 sheep and over 300 head of cattle on more than 1900 hectares. He subdivided some of his land in 1841 and advertised it for sale as the "Village of Ermington", but not many blocks were sold. In 1843, Lockyer sold off his remaining holdings. Lockyer died in 1860. His third child by his second marriage, born in England, was named Sarah Ermington Lockyer.

=== Agriculture ===
Ermington played an early role in Australia's wine industry. In 1806 Gregory Blaxland established a vineyard in what is now Ermington and produced award-winning wines. During March 1822 Australia's first wine export was shipped to England from Blaxland's 'Brush Farm' vineyard in Ermington.

From the 1830s, the Ermington region became an important source of fruit for early Sydney, and it was a busy place in the packing season. Produce such as oranges, lemons, apples and apricots was carted down to Pennant Hills Wharf, and small boats including the Amy and the Growers Friend would transport it on to the markets in Sydney. Blue metal from the quarry in present-day Dundas Valley was also transported to Sydney for road building.

=== Industrial and residential development ===
In November 1886, the land bounded by present-day Silverwater Road, Jackson Street, Spurway Street and Lindsay Avenue was offered at auction as the Broad Oaks Estate. However, the auction was unsuccessful and the land reverted to grazing and dairying. Many years later the land was acquired by John Bridge Ltd, who engaged surveyors Lockie, Gannon, Worley and Campbell to prepare the current curvilinear design in 1930. The streets were named after Australian painters.

Further south, parts of the lower area adjacent to the Parramatta River were filled in the early 1930s in anticipation of a residential subdivision, also to be known as the Broadoaks Estate. However, these plans were stifled by the Great Depression. In 1943, the site was occupied by the Ermington Naval Storage Depot. Seven large nissen-style storage and repair warehouses were constructed to serve as a supplies store for the United States Army during World War II. The Royal Australian Navy continued to use the site for several years after the war to store non-explosive materials, and Prix Car Services used it to hold cars in the 1990s.

In 1945, the Australian government acquired many of the orchards and nurseries in Ermington, commenced large-scale subdivision and built hundreds of Housing and War Commission dwellings to accommodate returned servicemen and their families. There are still substantial Housing Commission holdings near the intersection of Spurway and Bartlett Streets.

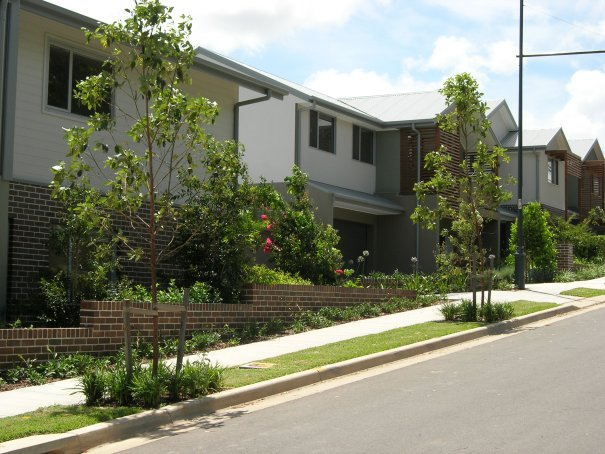
Riverwalk estate

During the 1970s, to the chagrin of the local residents, much of the area occupied by George Kendall Riverside Park (then called George Kendall Reserve) was used as a landfill site. Eventually the operation was decommissioned and the site revegetated.

Since the Sydney property boom in the early 2000s, a wave of young families have settled in Ermington in search for affordable houses, while the continued development of Parramatta attracts professional workers. In 2006/07, the site of the former Ermington Naval Storage Depot was cleared and Stockland commenced development of its Riverwalk estate, featuring high-market housing beside the Parramatta River.

== Commercial area ==
The Ermington Shopping Centre, opened in 1958, was an "essential amenity" for families in the new Housing and War Commission Homes. Today, these shops along Betty Cuthbert Avenue constitute a busy shopping hub.

== Landmarks ==
=== Army barracks ===
Timor Barracks is just inside the northern boundary of Ermington, on the corner of Kissing Point Road and Stewart Street. It is currently home to the 8th Command Support Regiment. Previously it was home to the Eastern Region Command Signals Regiment. The barracks used to be overlooked by a very tall antenna tower, providing communications for the army. The tower was pulled down some years ago. Today there is a mobile phone tower not too far from the site of the original army tower.

The barracks opened on 17 February 1968, on the former site of the 2CH radio station transmitter. Today the 2CH transmitter is located across the Parramatta river from Ermington, at Homebush Bay. The area surrounding the transmitter was a market garden owned by Yates. A nearby street in Dundas, is called Yates Avenue. Today the old market garden is residential housing, built in the 1960s.

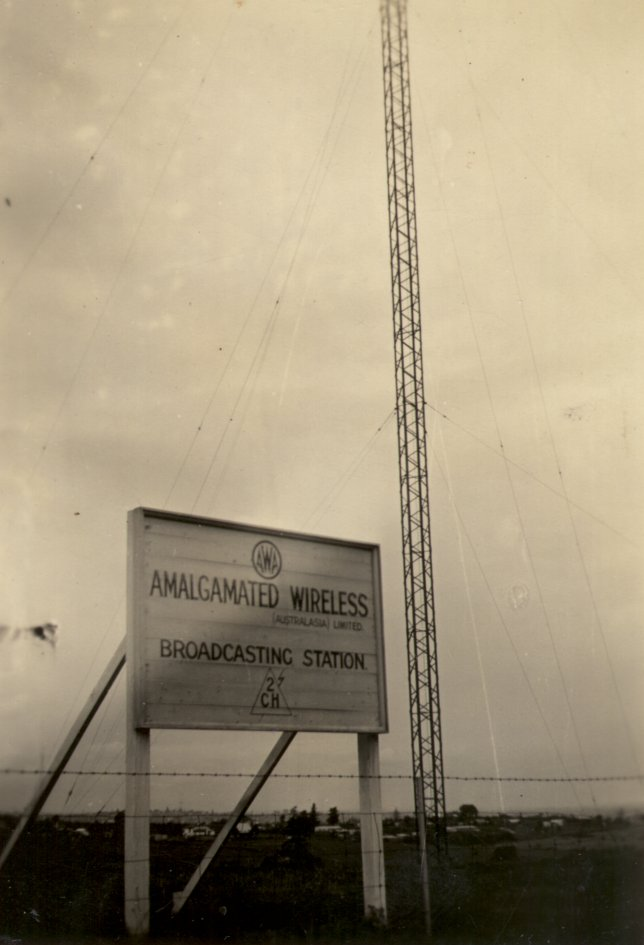
The old 2CH Radio Station Transmitter, where Timor Barracks now stands

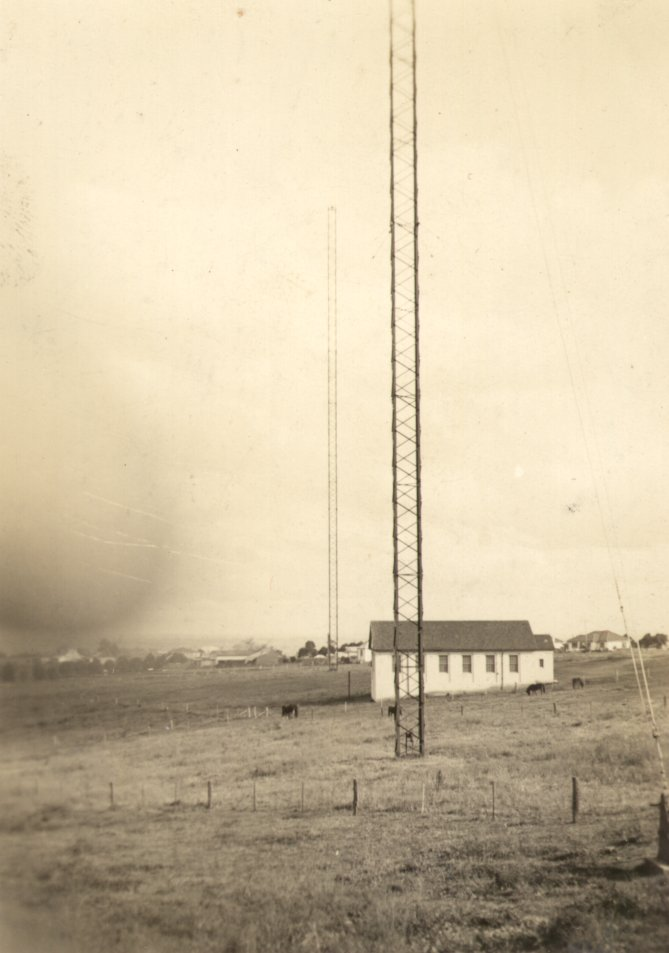
The old 2CH Radio Station Transmitter

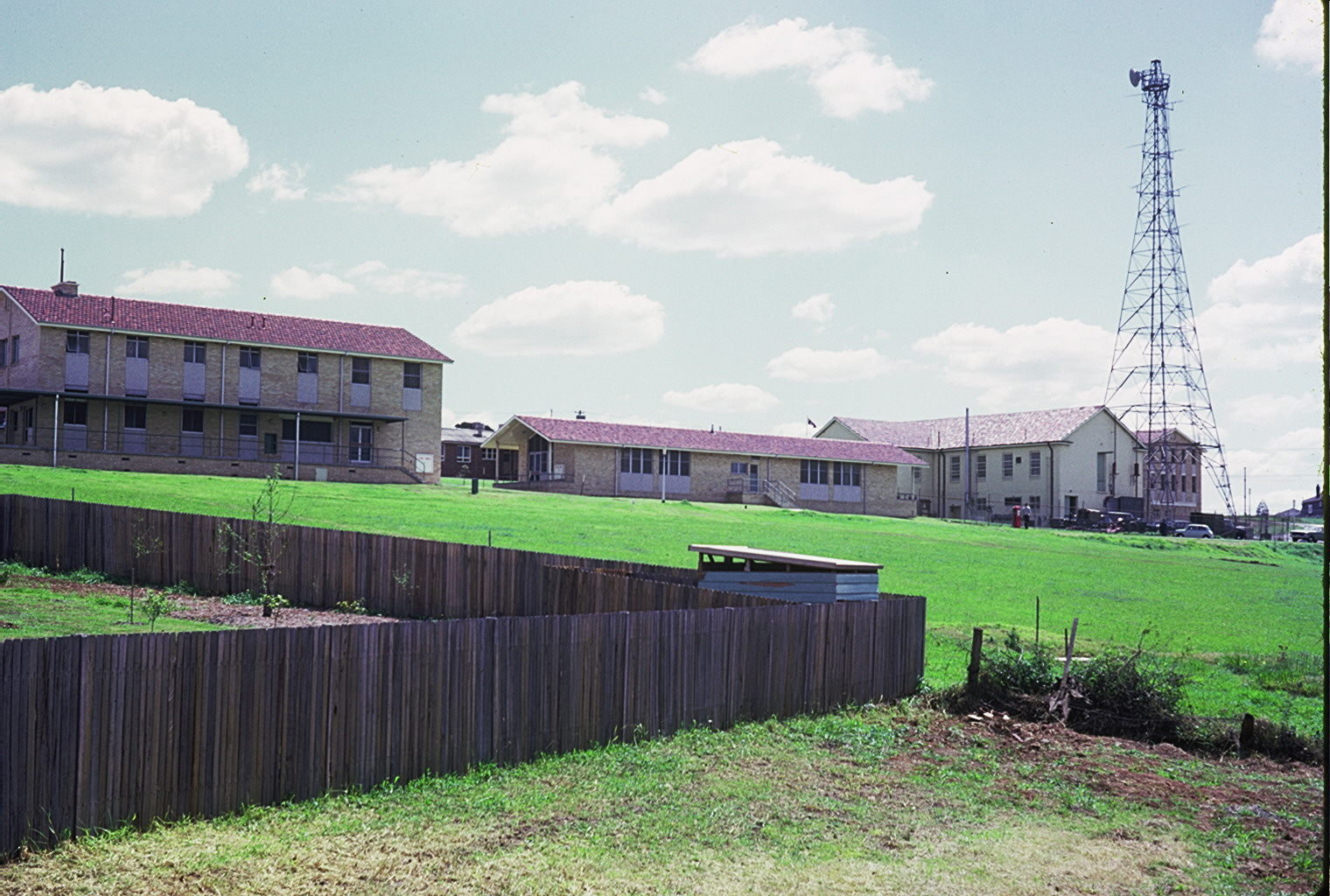
Timor Barracks in the 1960s, with the antenna tower visible.

=== The Lottie Stewart Hospital ===
Next to the Timor Barracks is the Lottie Stewart Hospital. The hospital has a history of palliative care and is operated by the Wesley Mission. It was opened in 1948. The Lottie Stewart Fete is an annual fixture in Ermington's calendar.

=== Subiaco Creek ===
Ermington is the watershed of the Subiaco Creek. The Creeks starts as runoff from the area containing Timor Barracks and Lottie Stewart Hospital. It enters a culvert and runs underneath Fremont Avenue at the bottom of the valley near house number 23. It then flows under an easement into Cowells Lane Reserve. "The Creek" (as it is called by locals) used to be mostly above ground, but as at 2006 has been mostly buried in a pipe. It surfaces again near the intersection of Stevens Street and Spurway Street.

== Transport ==
Victoria Road (A40) is a major route connecting Parramatta with Anzac Bridge and passes through Ermington. Stewart Street and Silverwater Road are parts of the A6 arterial route between Cumberland Highway at Carlingford and the Princes Highway at Heathcote. It intersects with Victoria Road at a flyover interchange on the western edge of Ermington and crosses the Parramatta River over Silverwater Bridge.

Busways operate six bus routes that service Ermington. The 501 travel to and from Parramatta station to Railway Square. The 523 travels via Spurway and Bartlett Streets in Ermington and on to West Ryde. The 524 services Melrose Park stopping along Boronia St then at Ermington Shops. This route then travels along the industrial section of Rydalmere along South Street and via the ferry wharf towards Parramatta. The 525 to Westfield Burwood from Parramatta services Ermington along Silverwater Road. The 544 route to Auburn station from Macquarie Centre also travels along Silverwater Road via Victoria Road in a south-westerly direction.

Stage 2 of the Parramatta Light Rail is an under construction light rail link between Westmead and Sydney Olympic Park via Parramatta. The project would pass through Ermington.

At the 2011 census, only 16% of employed people travelled to work on public transport and 66% by car (either as driver or as passenger).

== Schools ==
- Ermington West Public School
- Rydalmere East Public School
- Melrose Park Public School
- Ermington Public School is located in West Ryde, just outside the boundaries of Ermington.

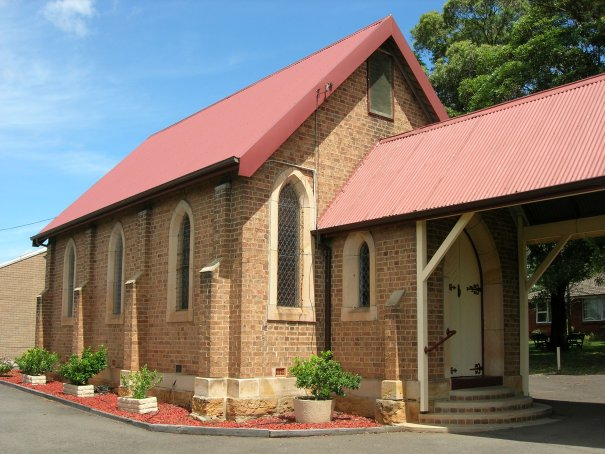
St Marks Anglican Church. Part of the original sandstone wall can be seen at its base.

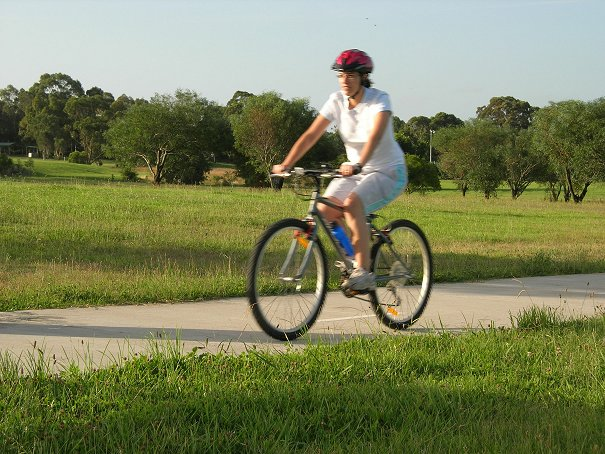
George Kendell Riverside Park

== Churches ==
The first church in Ermington, St Mark's Anglican Church, was opened in 1883. The first known Catholic mass in the area was celebrated in 1855, in a converted barn near Ermington House.

== Parks ==
Parks in the Ermington area include:

- George Kendall Riverside Park
- Eccles Park
- Cowells Lane Reserve
- Thomas Wemyss Park
- Millers Reserve
- Hilder Reserve
- Tristram Reserve
- Lockyer Reserve

== Sport and recreation ==
The Ermington United Sports & Recreation Club was founded in Ermington 1957 and is predominantly based at George Kendall Riverside Park. The club has since been involved in a variety of sports and recreational activities. These include: Cricket, AFL, archery and boomerang throwing. Currently the club is only involved in Soccer, Netball and Tennis.

1st Ermington Scouts was founded in 1953.

Tigers Baseball & Softball Club (formerly Epping Eastwood) play their home baseball games at George Kendall Riverside Park. There are 5 diamonds close to the river which are used for T-Ball, under age and senior baseball. The main diamond is named after the club's first life member, Gary Chong who was instrumental in its construction and is still an active member of the club.

George Kendall Riverside park also contains a number of locations fit for community or family based activities. These include: Playgrounds, Sheltered seating and cooking areas and a bike track.

== Population ==
=== Demographics ===
At the 2021 census, there were 12,686 residents in Ermington. Of these:

Ethnic diversity
52.8% of people were born in Australia. The most common other countries of birth were China 8.5%, South Korea 5.6%, Lebanon 2.1%, India 2.0% and Philippines 1.8%. The most common ancestries were Australian 18.8%, Chinese 18.2%, English 17.4%, Korean 7.6% and Lebanese 6.1%. 47.4% of people only spoke English at home. Other languages spoken at home included Mandarin 9.2%, Korean 7.3%, Cantonese 5.6%, Arabic 5.4% and Armenian 2.3%.
Religion
The most common responses for religion were No Religion 30.3%, Catholic 25.8% and Anglican 7.0%.
Age distribution
Ermington residents' median age was 37 years, compared to the national median of 38. Children aged under 15 years made up 19.4% of the population (national average is 18.2%) and people aged 65 years and over made up 14.0% of the population (national average is 17.2%).
Income
The median weekly household income was $1,993, more than the national median of $1,746.
Housing
Stand-alone houses accounted for 60.3% of occupied dwellings, while 21.2% were semi-detached (mostly townhouses) and 17.9% were flats, units or apartments. 42.8% of houses were rented – the rest were mostly owned with a mortgage (33.1%) or owned outright (21.9%). The average household size was 2.8 people.

=== Notable residents ===
- Betty Cuthbert, an Australian Olympic Athlete, grew up in Ermington and attended Ermington Public School. The main street of the Ermington shopping centre is called Betty Cuthbert Avenue, in her honour. Her family ran the Riverview Nursery (L Cuthbert & Sons) at 736 Victoria Road.
- Greg Matthews, a test cricketer, attended Ermington Public School
- Alexander McDonald (1792), a Royal Marines officer on the First Fleet, in Honor Street.
- Valerie Swain & Ben Swane were nursery and media personalities whose family founded a nursery in Ermington in 1919.

== Politics ==
Prior to the 2007 federal election Ermington was the easternmost suburb in the federal electoral division of Parramatta. Between 2007 and 2024, most of Ermington was contained within the federal electoral division of Bennelong, being on its western boundary. A small portion of the suburb, lying west of Silverwater Road, was in the division of Parramatta. Since the 2024 redistribution, all of Ermington has been in Parramatta again.

At the state level Ermington is contained within the State Electoral District Of Parramatta.

At the local government level Ermington is within the City of Parramatta local government area. The portion of Ermington east of Spurway Street is in the Lachlan Macquarie Ward while the portion west of Spurway Street is in the Elizabeth Macarthur Ward.
