= Philip Khoury (chef) =

Australian pastry chef at Harrods

- Born: July 1990; Westmead, New South Wales, Australia
- Education: Western Sydney University; TAFE NSW
- Known for: Pastry, Dessert, Plant-based baking, Beirut Chocolate
- Culinary career
- Cooking style: Plant-based desserts
- Award(s) won: Honorary Fellowship, Western Sydney University, 2024
- Website: www.philipkhoury.com

Philip Khoury (born 1990) is an Australian pastry chef who specialises in plant-based desserts. From 2018 to 2025, he was Head Pastry Chef at Harrods in London. His debut book A New Way to Bake (2023) won a Fortnum & Mason Food and Drink Award, among other accolades.

== Early life ==
Khoury is one of four children of Lebanese Catholic parents, his mother from Tannourine and his father from Dinniyeh, who had fled in light of the Lebanese Civil War. Khoury was born in Westmead and grew up in Oatlands, a Parramatta suburb of Sydney. He attended Parramatta Marist High School.

Khoury graduated with a Bachelor of Design from the Western Sydney University. He began his career as a communications designer and became interested in baking after visiting Paris. At age 21, at the encouragement of his boss who loved his homemade bakes, Khoury signed up for a retail baking apprenticeship at TAFE NSW in Ryde.

== Career ==
Khoury began his career working at Peter Gilmore's restaurant Quay and with Anna Polyviou at the Shangri-La Sydney. He was then an assistant to pâtissier Adriano Zumbo.

At age 29 while visiting London, Khoury was offered a position as Head of Pastry at Harrods. Whilst at Harrods, he oversaw a team of over 50 chefs who produce pastry items for the department store's various restaurants, food halls, and culinary lines. He stepped down from the position at the start of 2025, stating it was "time to take the next step" after a "fulfilling" six years.

In 2023 via Quadrille Publishing, Khoury published his debut cookbook A New Way to Bake, which contains plant-based baking recipes and reimaginings of classic and international desserts. Khoury promotes sustainable practices, challenging the industry's reliance on eggs and dairy. While his work is high end, Khoury believes in making food and baking accessible to ordinary people. He has also called for increased support for culinary programmes. A New Way to Bake was awarded Best Debut Cookery Book at the 2024 Fortnum & Mason Food and Drink Awards, Best Vegan Cookbook by PETA UK, and featured on 2023 and 2024 cookbook lists by Harper's Bazaar, British GQ, and Delicious magazine. Khoury also won the Innovation Award at the inaugural La Liste Pastry Special Awards for his advancements to the plant-based pastry.

Khoury has made recurring appearances on the BBC One programme Saturday Kitchen and contributed articles and recipes to The Guardian and BBC Food. He was also a guest judge in episodes of Bake Off: The Professionals on Channel 4 and appeared on This Morning and Good Morning America to talk about A New Way to Bake.

Initially for a charity bakesale, Khoury created Beirut Chocolate, a product that garnered notable attention in the Middle Eastern market in 2025. Initially introduced as a limited edition offering during the London Douk Fundraising for Lebanon Market in February 2025, the chocolate quickly gained popularity. The bar combines orange blossom caramel, twice-baked baklava, cashew crème, and almond milk chocolate, and features a vintage Lebanese postage stamp and a London postmark. In August 2025, Khoury officially launched his East London-based confectionery brand Khourys.

== Bibliography ==
- A New Way to Bake: Re-imagined Recipes for Plant-Based Cakes, Bakes and Desserts (2023)
- Beyond Baking: Plant-Based Baking for a New Era (2025)

== Awards ==
- 2023, Pastry Innovation Award, La Liste
- 2023, Best Vegan Cookbook, Peta for A New Way to Bake
- 2024, Debut Cookery Book, Fortnum & Mason Food and Drink Awards for A New Way to Bake
- 2024, Honorary Fellowship, Western Sydney University
