= Oatlands, New South Wales =

Oatlands
- Suburb
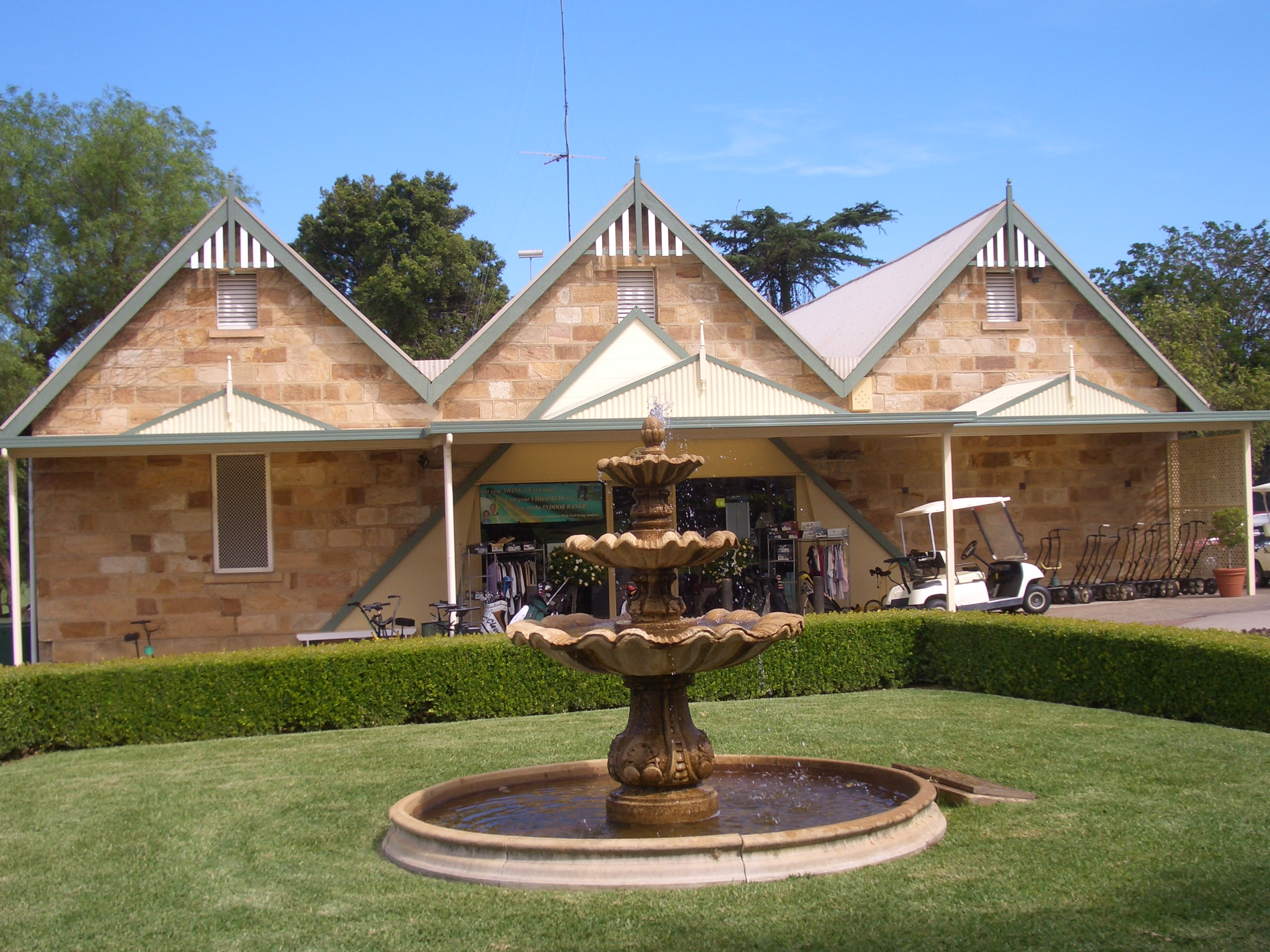
- Oatlands Golf Club

- Interactive map of Oatlands
- Country: Australia
- State: New South Wales
- City: Sydney
- LGA: City of Parramatta
- Location: 23 km (14 mi) NW of Sydney central business district

Government
  - State electorate: Epping
  - Federal division: Parramatta
- Elevation: 53 m (174 ft)

Population
  - Total: 5,833 (2021 census)
- Postcode: 2117
Suburbs around Oatlands
North Rocks	Carlingford	Carlingford
North Parramatta	Oatlands	Telopea
North Parramatta	Rydalmere	Dundas

Oatlands is a suburb of Sydney, in the state of New South Wales, Australia. It is 23 kilometres (14 miles) north-west of the Sydney central business district in the local government area of the City of Parramatta. Oatlands is part of Western Sydney.

The suburb extends from the south-east of Kissing Point Road and Vineyard Creek to the north-west bordering Pennant Hills Road and the North Rocks area.

== History ==
The name originally comes from Oatlands House, which was one of the earliest homes in the Parramatta district, being built in the 1830s by Percy Simpson. While it has been suggested that name reflects the first sowing of oats in Australia, this can't be confirmed. Instead, the name appears to be taken from Oatlands Park in England, which was close to the lands of Lord Dundas, for whom the neighbouring suburb was named. In 1840, the land was sold to James Bettington, who used it for sheep farming. Oatlands House is now used as function centre, with the surrounding land forming the Oatlands Golf Course, which was opened in 1931. Oatlands was defined as a new suburb in 1991. Prior to this, the area had been known as Dundas West.

Dundas West Post Office opened on 3 July 1967. It was renamed Oatlands in 1993.

In 1997, Oatlands became the shooting location with opening scenes of The Magic Club in the children's full-length film The Wiggles Movie.

== Landmarks ==
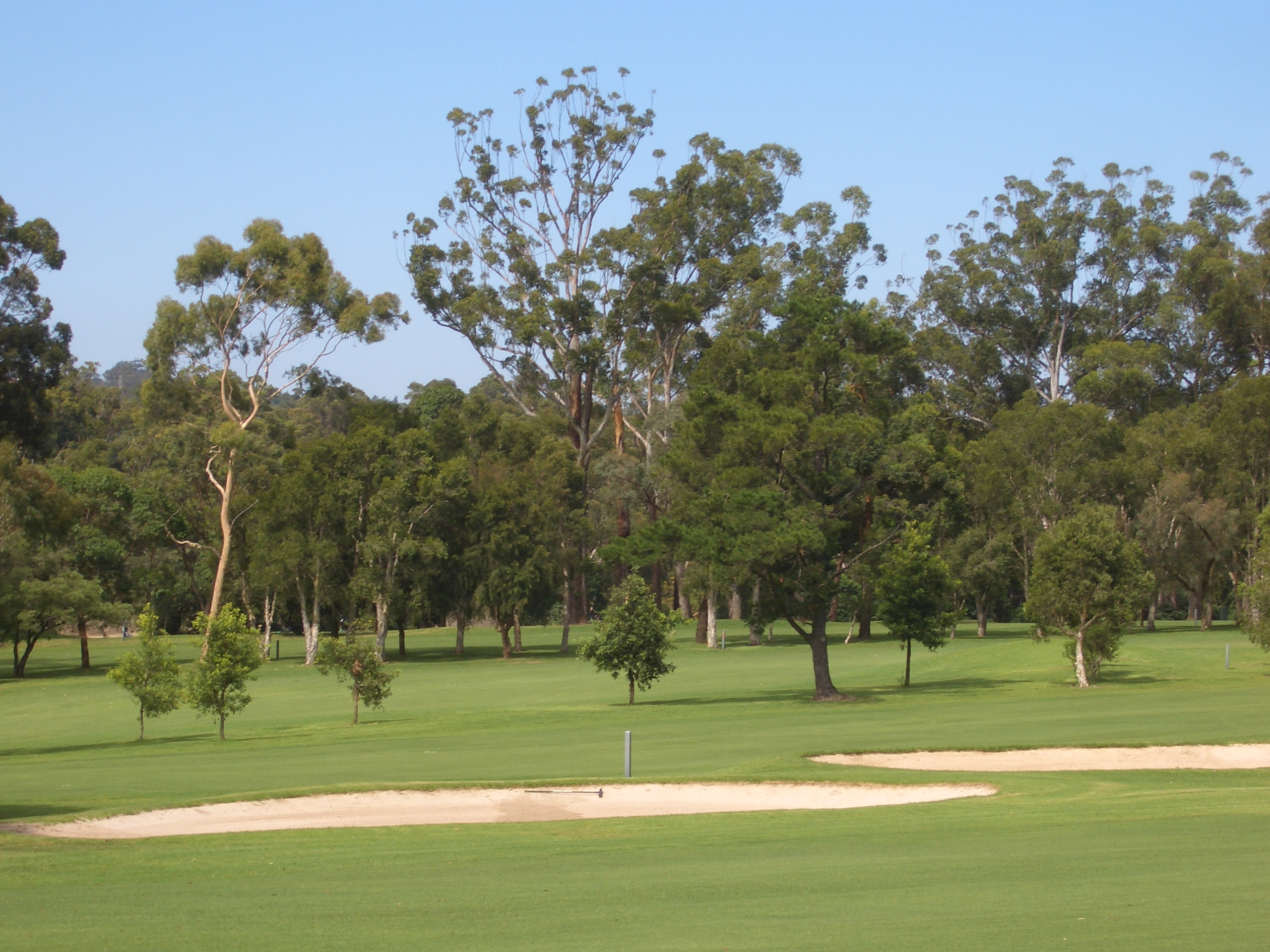
Oatlands Golf Course

Oatlands is home to the historic Oatlands House, located within the grounds of the Oatlands Golf Club. Annual events include the New South Wales Women's Open, attracting professional golf athletes and media attention to the area. Winners of this event include Laura Davies, Lydia Ko in 2012 (while still an amateur, and thereby becoming the youngest to win any professional tournament), Swede Caroline Hedwall, in 2013 and Joanna Klatten of France in 2014. The club is well renowned in the Sydney area, and is nominated as Australia's best par 70 course by former touring professional golfer and now media personality Brett Ogle.

In addition, touring professional and multiple Australian Open and Australian PGA winner Peter Lonard is a product of the cadet program at the club. He also served his PGA traineeship there, and was the club professional for some years before rejoining the tour after recovering from Ross River Fever.

Oatlands also includes the area known as Burnside, which was the site of Burnside Homes, the children's homes established by Sir James Burns in 1911. Although not used for children's homes any more, the area is still the site of the headquarters of Uniting Care Burnside, an agency of the Uniting Church in Australia. The name is also used by Burnside Public School, which was built on land belonging to the trust. The area contains mainly new housing developments such as Burnside Gardens Estate.

== Commercial area ==
There is a small shopping area featuring a post office, supermarket, fruit shop, liquor store, chicken shop, hairdressers, butcher, real estate, doctors' surgery, chemist and newsagency.

== School ==
- Oatlands Public School is located on Belmore Street.
- Burnside Public School

== Population ==
At the 2021 census, Oatlands recorded a population of 5,833. Of these:

- The age distribution was quite similar to the country in general. The median age was 42 years, slightly higher than the national median of 38 years. Children aged 0–14 years made up 18.5% of the population (national average is 18.2%) and people aged 65 years and over made up 18.4% of the population (national average is 17.2%).
- 58.4% of people were born in Australia. The most common countries of birth were China 7.7%, South Korea 4.2%, Lebanon 3.9%, India 3.5% and Hong Kong 2.4%.
- 51.9% of people only spoke English at home. Other languages spoken at home included Arabic 9.0%, Mandarin 8.3%, Korean 5.8%, Cantonese 5.7% and Hindi 1.8%.
- The most common responses for religion were Catholic 33.5%, No Religion 22.0% and Anglican 8.2%.
- Of all households, 81.5% were family households and 16.7% were single person households.

== Notable people ==
- Philip Khoury, pastry chef at Harrods
