= List of Sydney Metro stations =

The Sydney Metro network as of 2026, showing the Sydney Metro Northwest (opened in 2019) and the Sydney Metro City & Southwest (opened in 2024 and 2026)

The Sydney Metro is a rapid transit rail system in Sydney, New South Wales, Australia. The system is owned by the Government of New South Wales and is operated under contract by Metro Trains Sydney, a joint venture between MTR Corporation, John Holland Group, and UGL Rail. There are currently 31 Sydney Metro stations open and 52 kilometres (32 mi) of track. When current construction is complete, there will be 46 metro stations and 113 kilometres (70 mi) of track.

The first section of the Sydney Metro, the Sydney Metro Northwest project, opened on 26 May 2019 between Tallawong and Chatswood. This consists of thirteen stations, five of which were existing stations along the Epping to Chatswood rail link converted to metro use, and nine of which were new stations. The second section, the Sydney Metro City & Southwest project, opened in two stages: the section between Chatswood and Sydenham via the central business district opened on 19 August 2024, and the section between Sydenham and Bankstown, which consists of part of the Bankstown railway line converted to metro use, opened on 30 October 2026. The Chatswood to Sydenham section has eight new metro stations and the Sydenham to Bankstown section has ten new metro stations.

Sydney Metro Western Sydney Airport, which will have six new metro stations, is planned to open in 2027 after the opening of the Western Sydney Airport. Sydney Metro West is planned to open in 2032 and will have at least nine new stations, all of which will be underground.

Sydney Metro stations are either elevated, underground, or in a cutting. All stations will have platform screen doors and level boarding.

== List of current stations ==
§ Existing station wholly or partially converted for metro operation

List of current stations
Station	Image	Served by	Project	Location	Opened (Note: Refers to when the station opened for Sydney Metro services)	Transfers
Bankstown§		M1 Metro North West & Bankstown Line	City & Southwest	Bankstown	30 October 2026 (Note: Bankstown, Lakemba and Punchbowl stations originally opened on 14 April 1909.)	Sydney Trains
Barangaroo	Picture of Barangaroo station under construction.	M1 Metro North West & Bankstown Line	City & Southwest	Barangaroo	19 August 2024	Ferries
Bella Vista	Picture of Bella Vista station. It consists of a platform with platform screen doors within a cutting below ground.	M1 Metro North West & Bankstown Line	Northwest	Bella Vista	26 May 2019	
Belmore§	Westbound view of Belmore station.	M1 Metro North West & Bankstown Line	City & Southwest	Belmore	30 October 2026 (Note: Belmore, Campsie, Canterbury, Dulwich Hill, Hurlstone Park and Marrickville stations originally opened on 1 February 1895.)	
Campsie§	Platform of Campsie station.	M1 Metro North West & Bankstown Line	City & Southwest	Campsie	30 October 2026	
Canterbury§	Picture of Canterbury station.	M1 Metro North West & Bankstown Line	City & Southwest	Canterbury	30 October 2026	
Castle Hill	Picture of Castle Hill station. It consists of an underground platform with platform screen doors and a skylight above.	M1 Metro North West & Bankstown Line	Northwest	Castle Hill	26 May 2019	
Central	Picture of Central station. It consists of an underground platform with platform screen doors.	M1 Metro North West & Bankstown Line	City & Southwest	Sydney CBD	19 August 2024 (Note: Central station originally opened on 4 August 1906.)	Sydney Trains; Intercity, long distance and interstate trains Buses; Light Rail; Coaches
Chatswood§	Picture of Chatswood station. It consists of a metro train at a platform with platform screen doors.	M1 Metro North West & Bankstown Line	Northwest; City & Southwest	Chatswood	26 May 2019 (Note: Chatswood station originally opened on 1 January 1890.)	Sydney Trains; Intercity Trains
Cherrybrook	Picture of Cherrybrook station viewed from the outside. It consists of a curved roof covering a platform in a cutting below ground.	M1 Metro North West & Bankstown Line	Northwest	Cherrybrook	26 May 2019	
Crows Nest	Picture of Crows Nest station at platform level.	M1 Metro North West & Bankstown Line	City & Southwest	Crows Nest	19 August 2024	
Dulwich Hill§	Picture of Dulwich Hill station.	M1 Metro North West & Bankstown Line	City & Southwest	Dulwich Hill	30 October 2026	Light Rail
Epping§	Picture of the Epping station entrance. It has two signs outside it: "M" for metro and "T" for trains.	M1 Metro North West & Bankstown Line	Northwest	Epping	26 May 2019 (Note: Epping station originally opened on 17 September 1886.)	Sydney Trains; Intercity Trains
Gadigal	Picture of Gadigal station under construction from the street level.	M1 Metro North West & Bankstown Line	City & Southwest	Sydney CBD	19 August 2024	Sydney Trains; Light Rail (Town Hall)
Hills Showground	Picture of Hills Showground station. It consists of an underground platform with platform screen doors viewed from an escalator.	M1 Metro North West & Bankstown Line	Northwest	Castle Hill	26 May 2019	
Hurlstone Park§	Picture of Hurlstone Park station.	M1 Metro North West & Bankstown Line	City & Southwest	Hurlstone Park	30 October 2026	
Kellyville	Picture of Kellyville station from the outside. It consists of an elevated platform with a glass façade.	M1 Metro North West & Bankstown Line	Northwest	Kellyville	26 May 2019	
Lakemba§	Platform of Lakemba station.	M1 Metro North West & Bankstown Line	City & Southwest	Lakemba	30 October 2026	
Macquarie Park§	Picture of Macquarie Park station. It consists of an underground platform with platform screen doors and a curved roof.	M1 Metro North West & Bankstown Line	Northwest	Macquarie Park	26 May 2019 (Note: Macquarie Park, Macquarie University and North Ryde stations originally opened on 23 February 2009 as part of the Epping to Chatswood rail link.)	
Macquarie University§	Picture of Macquarie University station. It consists of an underground platform with platform screen doors and a curved roof, similar to Macquarie Park station.	M1 Metro North West & Bankstown Line	Northwest	Macquarie Park	26 May 2019	
Marrickville§	Platform of Marrickville station.	M1 Metro North West & Bankstown Line	City & Southwest	Marrickville	30 October 2026	
Martin Place	Picture of Martin Place station escalators underground.	M1 Metro North West & Bankstown Line	City & Southwest	Sydney CBD	19 August 2024 (Note: Martin Place station originally opened on 23 June 1979.)	Sydney Metro West at Hunter Street; Sydney Trains
North Ryde§	North Ryde station underground platforms.	M1 Metro North West & Bankstown Line	Northwest	North Ryde	26 May 2019	
Norwest	Picture of Norwest station. It consists of an underground platform with platform screen doors.	M1 Metro North West & Bankstown Line	Northwest	Norwest	26 May 2019	
Punchbowl§	Picture of Punchbowl station.	M1 Metro North West & Bankstown Line	City & Southwest	Punchbowl	30 October 2026	
Rouse Hill	Picture of Rouse Hill station. The station has elevated platforms. The picture was taken below the platforms at the ground level concourse, which is surrounded by green-coloured glass on the exterior.	M1 Metro North West & Bankstown Line	Northwest	Rouse Hill	26 May 2019	
Sydenham§	Picture of Sydenham station's new overpass entrance from street level.	M1 Metro North West & Bankstown Line	City & Southwest	Sydenham	19 August 2024 (Note: Sydenham station originally opened on 15 October 1884.)	Sydney Trains
Tallawong	Picture of Tallawong station viewed from the outside. It consists of a curved roof covering a platform in a cutting below ground.	M1 Metro North West & Bankstown Line	Northwest	Tallawong	26 May 2019	
Victoria Cross	Picture of Victoria Cross station entrance at street level.	M1 Metro North West & Bankstown Line	City & Southwest	North Sydney	19 August 2024	
Waterloo	Picture of Waterloo station under construction from street level.	M1 Metro North West & Bankstown Line	City & Southwest	Waterloo	19 August 2024	
Wiley Park§	Northbound view of Wiley Park station.	M1 Metro North West & Bankstown Line	City & Southwest	Wiley Park	30 October 2026 (Note: Wiley Park station originally opened on 19 June 1938.)	

== List of future stations ==
List of future stations
Station	Image	Project	Location	Planned opening	Transfers
Airport Business Park	Airport Business Park station under construction	Western Sydney Airport	Badgerys Creek	2027	
Airport Terminal	Airport Terminal station under construction	Western Sydney Airport	Badgerys Creek	2027	
Bradfield	Bradfield station under construction	Western Sydney Airport	Bringelly	2027	
Burwood North	Picture of Burwood North station under construction from within the concrete station box.	West	Burwood	2032	
Five Dock		West	Five Dock	2032	
Hunter Street	Hunter Street station under construction	West	Sydney	2032	Metro North West & Bankstown Line (Martin Place); Sydney Trains (Martin Place & Wynyard); Light Rail
Luddenham	Luddenham station under construction	Western Sydney Airport	Luddenham	2027	
North Strathfield		West	North Strathfield	2032 (Note: North Strathfield station originally opened on 9 June 1918.)	Sydney Trains at North Strathfield railway station
Orchard Hills		Western Sydney Airport	Orchard Hills	2027	
Parramatta	Construction site as seen from the Powerhouse Museum.	West	Parramatta	2032	Sydney Trains at Parramatta railway station Light Rail
Pyrmont		West	Pyrmont	2032	
St Marys		Western Sydney Airport	St Marys	2027 (Note: St Marys station originally opened on 1 May 1862.)	Sydney Trains at St Marys railway station
Sydney Olympic Park		West	Sydney Olympic Park	2032	Sydney Trains at Olympic Park railway station
The Bays		West	Bays Precinct	2032	
Westmead		West	Westmead	2032	Sydney Trains at Westmead railway station Light Rail
