= Olympic Stadium (disambiguation) =

Olympic Stadium is the name usually given to the main stadium of an Olympic Games.

Olympic Stadium may specifically refer to:

== Stadia used for Olympic Games ==
- Olympic Stadium (Amsterdam), Netherlands
- Olympisch Stadion (Antwerp), Belgium
- Olympic Stadium (Athens), Greece
- Centennial Olympic Stadium, Atlanta, United States
- Olympiastadion (Berlin), Germany
- Stadio olimpico del ghiaccio, Cortina d'Ampezzo, Italy
- Olympic Stadium (Grenoble), France
- Helsinki Olympic Stadium, Finland
- Olimpiyskiy National Sports Complex (also known as Olympic Stadium), Kyiv, Ukraine
- London Stadium (formerly and also known as Olympic Stadium), London, England
- Estadio Olímpico Universitario, Mexico City, Mexico
- Olympic Stadium (Montreal), Canada
- Olympic Stadium (Moscow), Russia
- Olympiastadion (Munich), Germany
- Nagano Olympic Stadium, Japan
- Stade Olympique Yves-du-Manoir, Paris, France
- Estádio Olímpico Nilton Santos (formerly Estádio Olímpico João Havelange), Rio de Janeiro, Brazil
- Stadio Olimpico, Rome, Italy
- Seoul Olympic Stadium, South Korea
- Fisht Olympic Stadium, Sochi, Russia
- Stockholm Olympic Stadium, Sweden
- Stadio Olimpico Grande Torino, Turin, Italy

== Other stadia called "Olympic Stadium" ==
- Saparmurat Turkmenbashy Olympic Stadium, Ashgabat, Turkmenistan
- Baku Olympic Stadium, Azerbaijan
- Estadio Olímpico Benito Juárez, Ciudad Juárez, Mexico
- RSC Olimpiyskiy, Donetsk, Ukraine
- Guangdong Olympic Stadium, Guangzhou, China
- Olympic Stadium (Hoquiam), Washington (state), US
- Atatürk Olympic Stadium, Istanbul, Turkey
- Stade Olympique de la Pontaise, Lausanne, Switzerland
- Olympic Park Stadium (Melbourne), Australia
- Oran Olympic Stadium - Miloud Hadefi, Algeria
- Olympic Stadium (Phnom Penh), Cambodia
- Estádio Olímpico Monumental, Porto Alegre, Brazil
- Estadio Olímpico Atahualpa, Quito, Ecuador
- Stadio Olimpico di San Marino, San Marino
- Stadion Olimpijski (Wrocław), Poland

== See also ==
- Olympic Park (disambiguation)
- Estadio Olímpico (disambiguation)
- Stadio Olimpico (disambiguation)
