= Burwood railway station =

Burwood railway station may refer to:

- Burwood North metro station, proposed Sydney Metro West station
- Burwood railway station, Sydney, on the Sydney Trains network
- Burwood railway station, Melbourne

== See also ==
- Burswood railway station, Perth
