= Olympic Park railway station =

Olympic Park railway station may refer to:

- Olympic Park railway station, Sydney, Australia
- Sydney Olympic Park metro station, a proposed metro station in Sydney, Australia
- Olympic Park station (Seoul), in Seoul, South Korea
- Imeretinsky Kurort railway station, formerly Olympic Park, in Sochi, Russia
- Aolinpike Gongyuan (Olympic Park) station, Beijing Subway, China

== See also ==
- Olympic Park (disambiguation)
