= Parramatta Light Rail =

Light rail line in Sydney, New South Wales

L4 Westmead & Carlingford Line

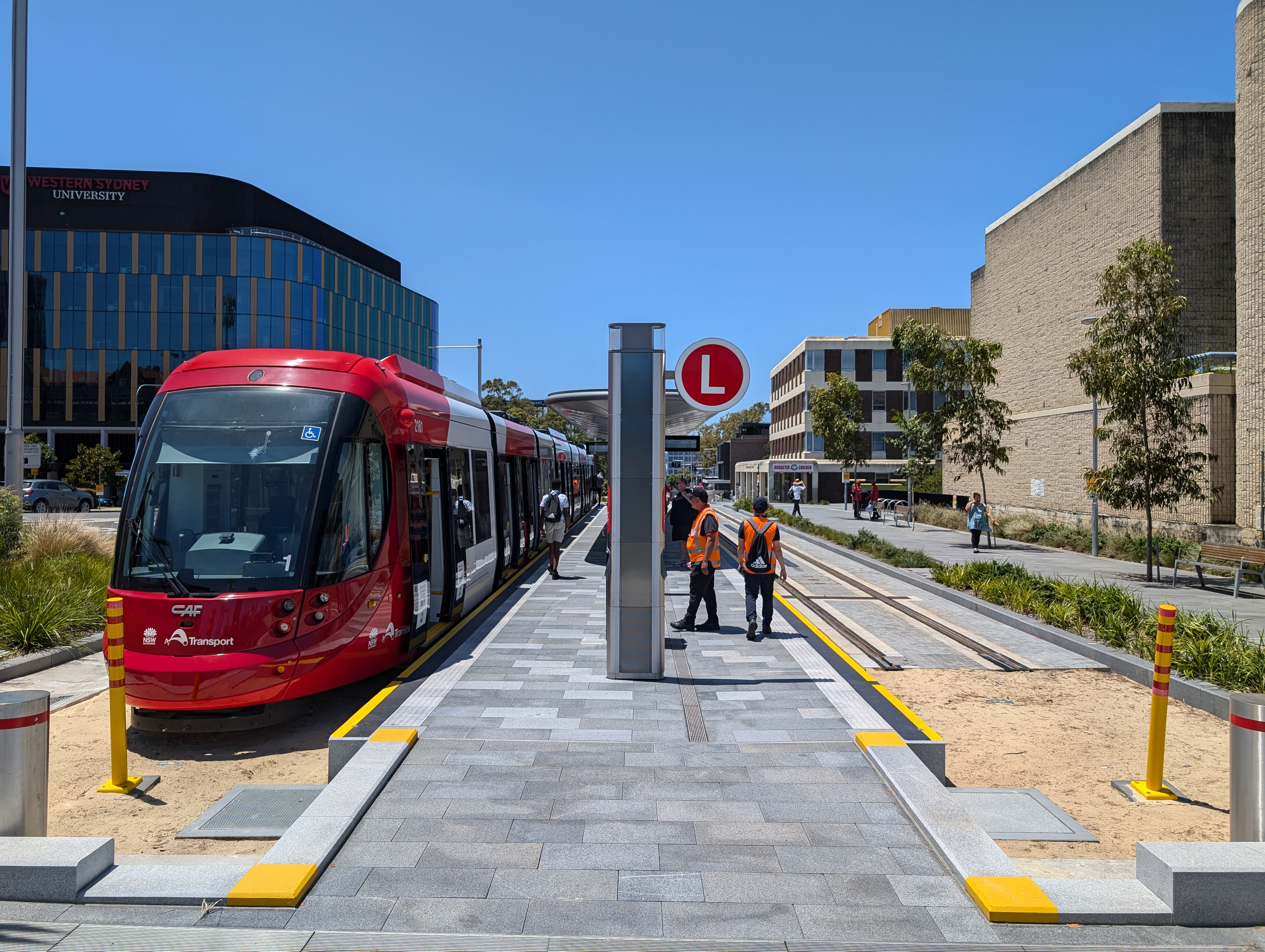
- An Urbos 100 at Westmead, December 2024

Overview
- Status: Operational (Stage 1); Under construction (Stage 2a); Planned (Stage 2b)
- Owner: Transport for NSW
- Locale: Parramatta, New South Wales
- Termini: Westmead; Carlingford (Stage 1); Wentworth Point (Stage 2a); Sydney Olympic Park (Stage 2b)
- Stations: 16 (open); 9 (under construction); 5 (planned); 30 (total)
- Website: parramattalightrail.nsw.gov.au

Service
- Services: 1 (open); 1 (under construction); 1 (planned); 3 (total)
- Operator(s): Great River City Light Rail (Transdev & CAF joint venture)
- Depot: Camellia
- Rolling stock: 13 Urbos 100

History
- Opened: 20 December 2024 (Stage 1)

Technical
- Line length: 12 kilometres (7 mi) (Stage 1); 4.5 kilometres (3 mi) (Stage 2a); 5.5 kilometres (3 mi) (Stage 2b)
- Track gauge: 1,435 mm (4 ft 8 1/2 in) standard gauge
- Electrification: 750 V DC from overhead catenary CAF ACR at Westmead

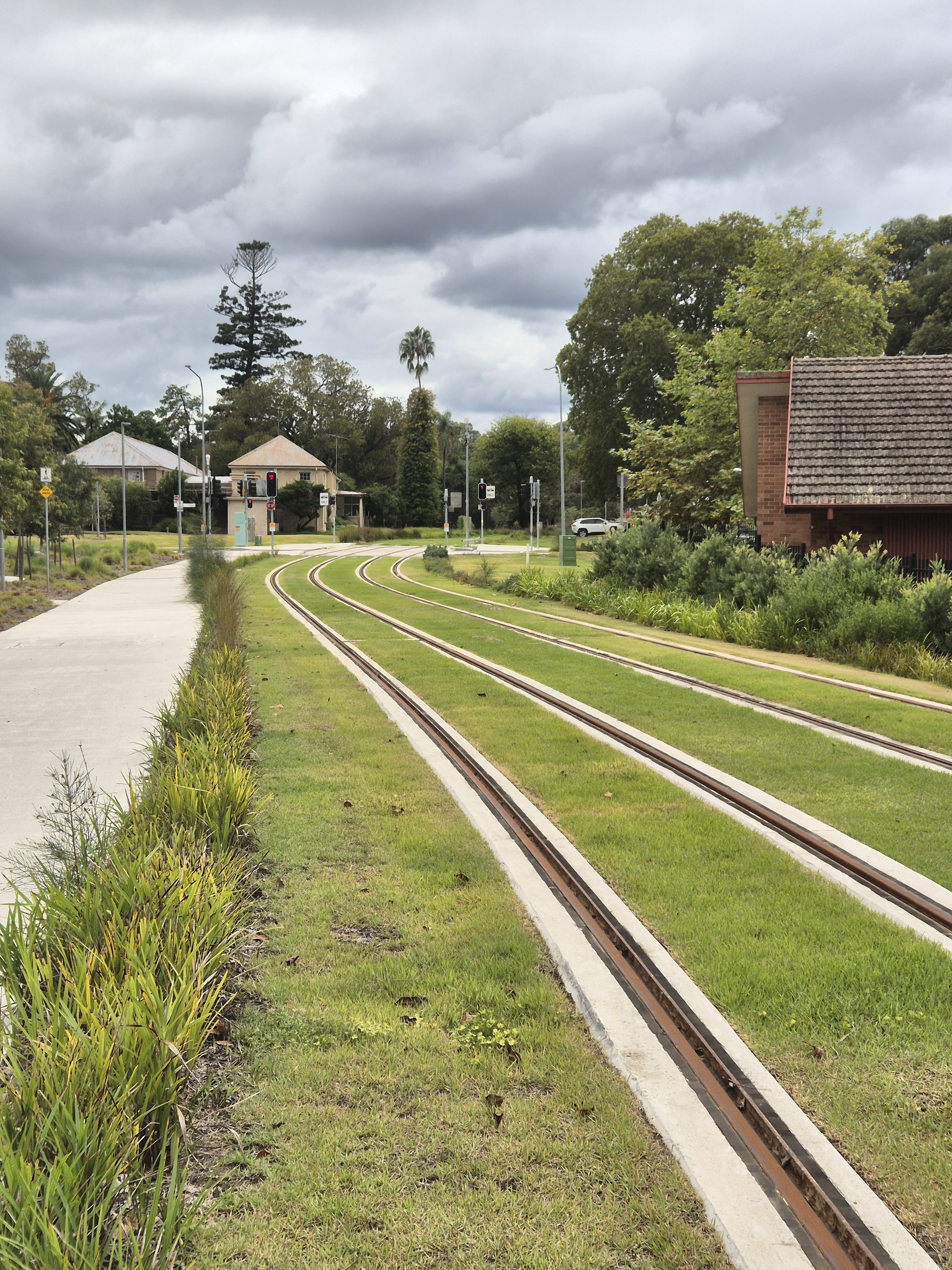
Parts of the light rail contain green track; this is an example near Cumberland Hospital.

The Parramatta Light Rail is a 12-kilometre (7 mi) standard gauge light rail line in Sydney, New South Wales, Australia. The first stage of the line runs from Westmead to Carlingford via the Western Sydney centre of Parramatta. Construction commenced in 2019, and the first stage opened on 20 December 2024. Services on the first stage run as the L4 Westmead & Carlingford Line.

A second stage is planned for a branch from Camellia or Rydalmere to Wentworth Point and eventually Sydney Olympic Park. Construction of stage two commenced in late 2024, with major works beginning in 2025.

The Parramatta Light Rail network is physically separate from the rest of Sydney's light rail network and hence does not connect with the L1, L2 and L3 lines.

It is distinct from the proposed Parramatta Road to Green Square route.

== History ==
=== Predecessors ===
The Main Suburban line, the first railway in Sydney, opened in 1855 between Sydney and Granville and was extended to Parramatta in 1860, making Parramatta railway station one of the oldest in Sydney. In 1883, the Parramatta – Duck River tramway began operation under Sydney Ferries Limited, running between Parramatta Park to the mouth of Duck River, where it connected with the Parramatta River ferry services to Sydney. In 1885, the Carlingford railway line opened between Clyde and Camellia and was extended to Carlingford in 1896, while the Sandown line opened as a branch in 1888. In 1902, the Rogans Hill railway line opened as a steam tramway, was extended to Castle Hill in 1910, and was converted into a railway between 1919 and 1923 with a final extension to Rogans Hill in 1924.

The Rogans Hill railway closed in 1932 due to competition from automobiles and motor buses on adjacent roads. The Duck River tramway ceased passenger service following the cancellation of the ferry service in 1928, operating as a freight railway until its closure in 1943. Passenger service ended on the Sandown line in 1991 and the line closed in 2010. By this time, only the Carlingford and Main Suburban lines were still in operation in the Parramatta area.

=== Route investigation ===
In 2013, Parramatta City Council published a $1 million feasibility study into a proposed light rail network for Western Sydney. The study proposed light rail lines from Parramatta and Westmead to Macquarie Centre via Eastwood and Dundas, and to Castle Hill along the original Rogans Hill railway route.

As part of its 2014–15 budget, the New South Wales Government announced Transport for NSW would investigate ten potential light rail routes in Western Sydney. The government allocated $400 million to ensure funds for detailed planning and construction of an initial project would be 'ready to go', should the investigations prove favourable. Six of the ten routes being investigated were eliminated from contention in October 2014. The routes investigated were:

Route	Status
Parramatta to Bankstown	Not selected
Parramatta to Castle Hill via Old Northern Road	Not selected
Parramatta to Castle Hill via Windsor Road (based on the route proposed by Parramatta City Council)	Eliminated in October 2014
Parramatta to Liverpool via the T-way	Eliminated in October 2014
Parramatta to Macquarie Park via Carlingford	Parramatta–Carlingford section selected
Parramatta to Macquarie Park via Eastwood (based on the route proposed by Parramatta City Council)	Eliminated in October 2014
Parramatta to Strathfield/Burwood via Sydney Olympic Park (extended to Strathfield/Burwood in October 2014)	Strathfield option selected
Parramatta to Sydney CBD via Parramatta Road (Proposed Parramatta Road and Green Square light rail)	Eliminated in October 2014
Parramatta to Rouse Hill	Eliminated in October 2014
Parramatta to Ryde via Victoria Road	Eliminated in October 2014

Of the final four routes, the Macquarie Park via Carlingford and the Strathfield via Olympic Park options were perceived as the frontrunners to be selected. The Macquarie Park route was supported by Parramatta, Ryde and The Hills councils. The Strathfield route was supported by The WestLine Partnership, a lobby group consisting of businesses and organisations with a presence in the area. Auburn and Canada Bay councils were later joined by Strathfield Council as members of the group.

The Strathfield route passes through industrial areas of Sydney and the potential for these areas to generate funding and patronage was a key point of contention during the lobbying period. The WestLine Partnership suggested the Strathfield route could be partially financed via value capture. Property developers building urban renewal projects along the line would provide a financial contribution to the government. The group also suggested building a branch from Newington to Rhodes and indicated its funding model could allow a route to Carlingford to be built as well. Supporters of the Macquarie Park route argued the needs of that corridor were more pressing and the Strathfield route would be poorly utilised in its early years.

=== Official announcement ===
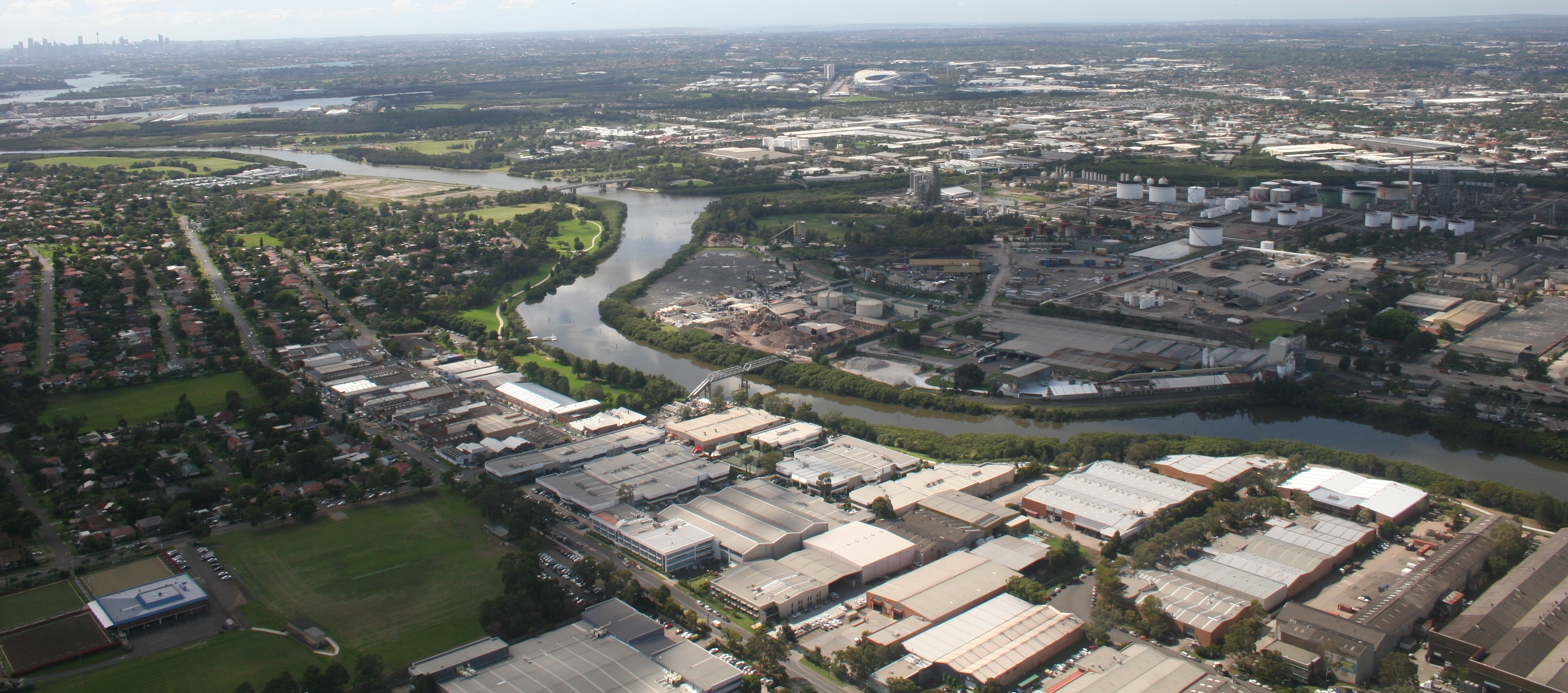
The Parramatta River passing through Rydalmere and Camellia, as seen in 2010. A mixture of low density housing and light industry can be seen on the Rydalmere side of the river. Heavy industry dominates on the Camellia side. Sydney Olympic Park can be seen in the middle distance.

The Parramatta Light Rail scheme was officially unveiled on 8 December 2015, when the government announced it had selected the Strathfield route plus a truncated version of the Macquarie Park route that ends at Carlingford. The two routes were proposed to converge at Camellia and proceed through Parramatta to Westmead.

The government's announcement included a $1 billion contribution towards the project. The government will also adopt the value capture approach advocated by The WestLine Partnership, by instigating an infrastructure contribution on new residential developments along the route. The revenue raised by the levy will be used to help fund the light rail and other infrastructure for the area. The government's investigations into the value capture process held up the announcement of the preferred route but would reportedly have allowed the two lines to be built together. The state government will also explore funding contributions from the federal and local tiers of government. The convenor of the partnership stated that the light rail project's funding model would be used as a test case for funding future infrastructure projects.

Construction of the lines was expected to commence in late 2018 but there was no announcement of an expected completion date or a total budget for the project. An early estimate from January 2016 put the total cost at $3.51 billion.

=== Deferral and redesign of the eastern branch ===
In August 2016, Transport for NSW noted the project could be delivered in stages. A new metro line between the Sydney central business district and Parramatta was announced in November 2016. The metro would adopt a similar route to the Strathfield branch of the light rail; media reports indicated the metro project would most likely cause the deferral of construction of this branch. This was confirmed in February 2017, when it was announced that the Westmead–Camellia section and the Carlingford branch would be built as stage 1 of the light rail project.

Despite the deferral of construction, planning work for the Strathfield via Sydney Olympic Park branch continued. Media reports from 2017 indicated the route could shift from running to the south of the Parramatta River to the north of the river and that the section from Sydney Olympic Park to Strathfield could be dropped.

The preferred stage 2 route was announced in October 2017. The changes reported on by the media were confirmed. The redesigned route runs from either Rydalmere or Camellia to Sydney Olympic Park via Ermington, Melrose Park and Wentworth Point. No details about the project's cost or construction dates were announced.

In November 2020, it was reported that the block of land at Camellia, bought by the NSW government for $53.5 million for the stabling and maintenance depot, was effectively worthless because of high levels of soil contamination. The purchase was referred to the Independent Commission Against Corruption (ICAC) because an internal investigation by the NSW transport department found the purchase of the land, for three times what the Valuer-General estimated it was worth, broke basic rules, and the land was bought from a developer without a valuation. The developer had bought the six-hectare parcel of land only months before, for $38 million.

In 2022, it was reported that it would take until 2031 to open stage 2 for passenger operations, 5 years longer than originally planned.

In February 2024, stage 2 of the Parramatta Light Rail was approved by the New South Wales Government, with the 2023–24 state budget committing $200 million to the project.

== Design ==
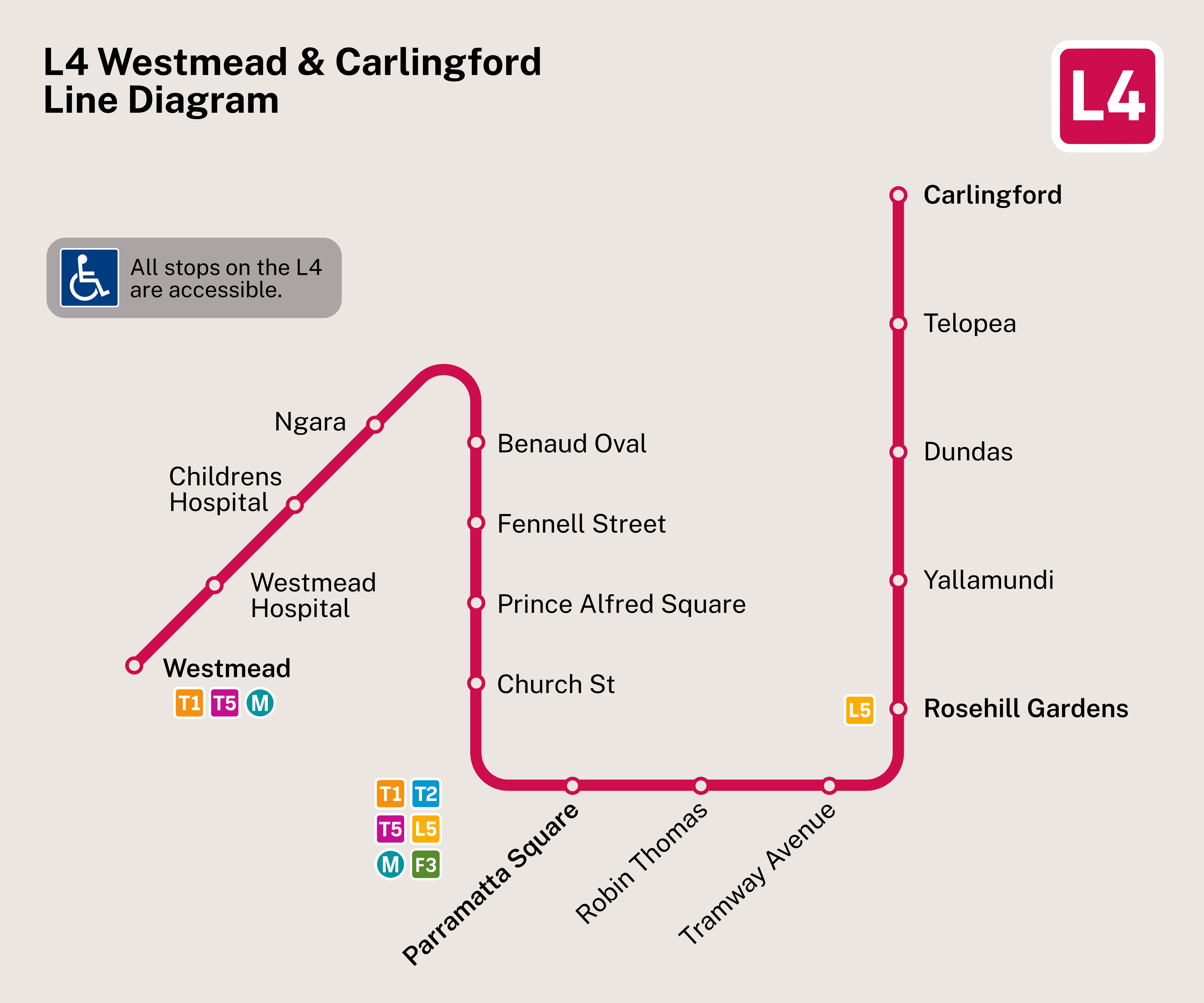
Line diagram of stage 1

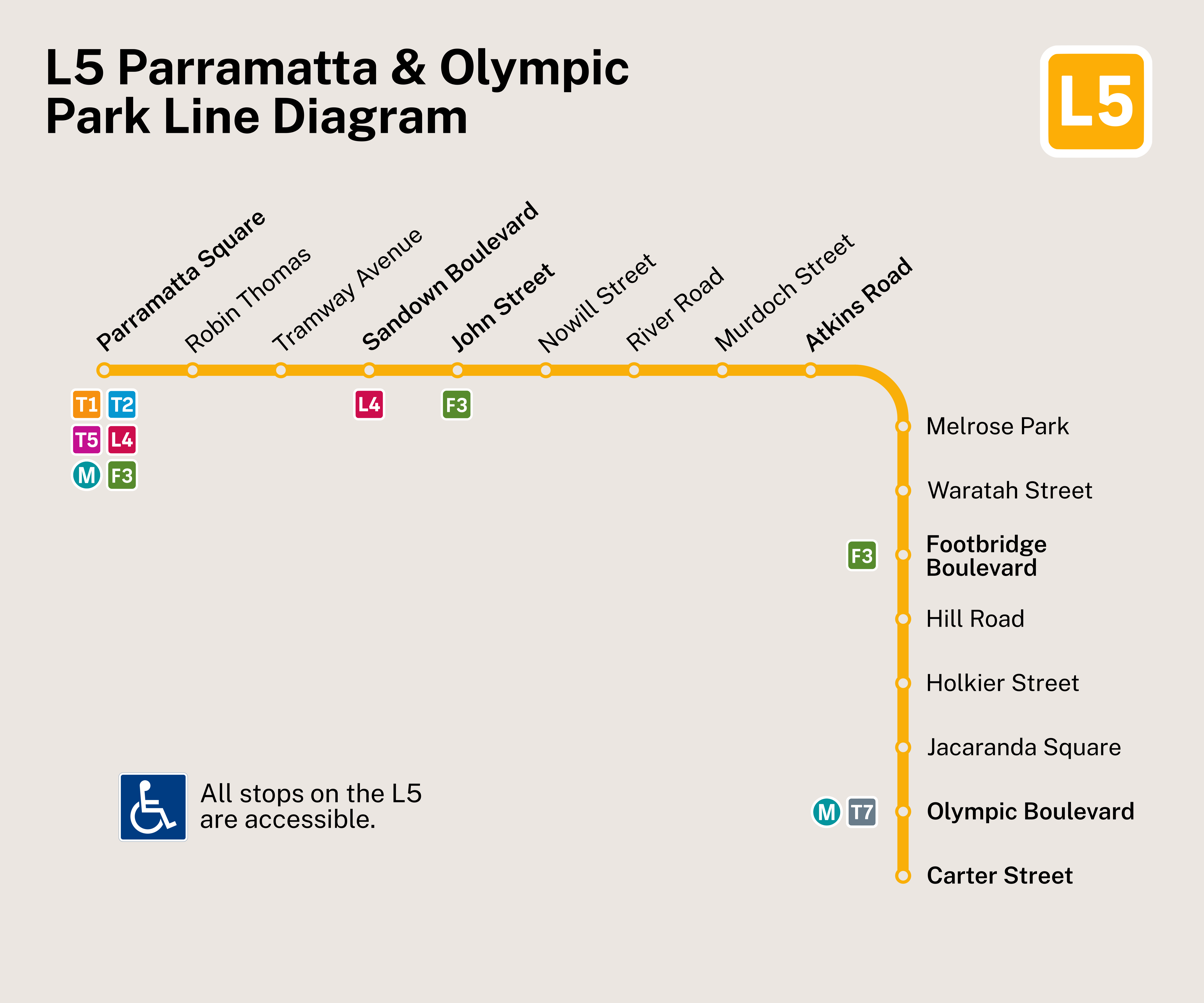
Line diagram of stage 2

The routes begins at Westmead before proceeding east to Camellia via North Parramatta and the Parramatta CBD. At Rosehill Gardens the two routes split. The Stage 1 route goes north to Carlingford, while the Stage 2 route continues east to Sydney Olympic Park.

=== Stage 1: Westmead to Carlingford ===
The stage 1 route was announced on 17 February 2017. The stage 1 route runs between Westmead and Carlingford via North Parramatta, the Parramatta CBD, Camellia, Rydalmere, Dundas and Telopea. It includes sixteen stops along a 12 km (7 mi) route. It includes two wire-free sections—one between Westmead and Cumberland Hospital—and another between Prince Alfred Square and Tramway Avenue. The maintenance and stabling facility will be located east of Rosehill Racecourse. Trams will access the facility via a short branch line that uses the alignment of the Sandown railway line. Extension from Carlingford to Epping is under study.

The Environmental Impact Statement for stage 1 was released in August 2017. Planning approval was granted in May 2018.

=== Stage 2a: Rosehill Gardens to Footbridge Boulevard (Wentworth Point) ===
The second branch of the light rail is planned to continue east to Footbridge Boulevard in Wentworth Point.

There are two options being considered for the connection to the stage 1 route. The first option would utilise the Carlingford railway line (and stage 1) corridor over the Parramatta River to Rydalmere, where it would then branch. The second option would leave the main stage 1 route at Camellia and utilise the branch line built to provide access to the tram depot. It would continue via the Sandown railway line corridor and Grand Avenue, then cross the Parramatta River just east of Rydalmere ferry wharf. Both versions of the route then continue via Ermington and Melrose Park, cross back to the south of the Parramatta River, pass through Wentworth Point and terminate at Sydney Olympic Park. The stage 2 route is around nine kilometres (six miles) long and will include ten to twelve stops. The second option is shown as the planned route on the Parramatta Light Rail website.

The original plans for this branch followed a route similar to that taken by Grand Avenue through Camellia before crossing the Duck River, passing through Newington, crossing Haslams Creek, serving Sydney Olympic Park and terminating at the major transport hub of Strathfield.

In April 2024, a NSW Legislative Council inquiry into current and future public transport needs in Western Sydney recommended "that the Government urgently investigate extending Stage 2 of the Parramatta Light Rail project so that the line no longer terminates at the Carter Street precinct but continues from there to terminate at Lidcombe railway station." This recommendation was endorsed by Cumberland Council and public transport advocacy groups such as EcoTransit Sydney.

=== Stage 2b: Footbridge Boulevard to Carter Street (Sydney Olympic Park) ===
On 30 January 2026, the New South Wales Government announced that Stage 2 of the Parramatta Light Rail would be delivered in two separate parts, rather than as a single continuous project as previously planned. Under this revised approach, the section between Rosehill Gardens and Footbridge Boulevard at Wentworth Point would be constructed first, with the extension from Footbridge Boulevard to the Carter Street precinct at Sydney Olympic Park to be delivered as a later stage, subject to future funding and approvals. No funding allocation, construction timeline, or opening date has been confirmed for both Stage 2a and 2b.

== Operation ==
The Westmead & Carlingford Line, numbered L4, is the service name of the stage 1 route.

Great River City Light Rail (a joint venture between Transdev and CAF) was contracted to operate the network for the first eight years, with a possible extension of up to an additional ten years.

The Parramatta Light Rail is classified as a separate operation to the inner-city Sydney Light Rail network.

=== Fleet ===
Stage 1 is operated by a fleet of thirteen Urbos 100 built by Construcciones y Auxiliar de Ferrocarriles (CAF). Urbos 100 are also already in operation on the Inner West Light Rail in five module configuration. The Urbos 100 on the Parramatta Light Rail will instead operate in seven modules with a length of 45.5 metres (149 ft), feature onboard batteries and in-ground charging.

== Stage 1 construction ==
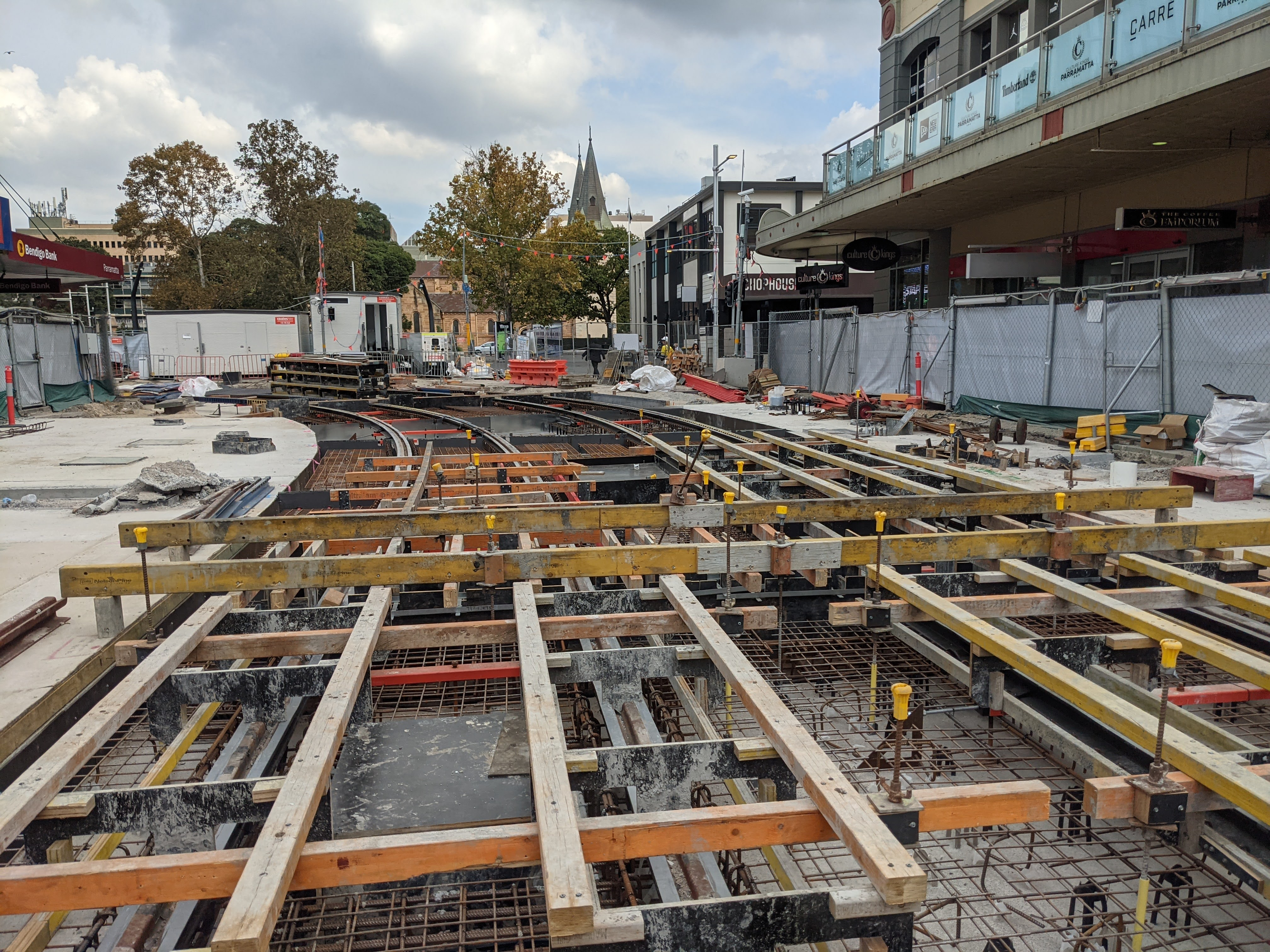
Construction along Church Street, Parramatta, April 2021

In November 2017, a CPB Contractors/Downer Group joint venture and John Holland were shortlisted to build stage 1. At the same time, three consortia were shortlisted to supply the rolling stock, maintain the infrastructure and operate the services:

- Connecting Parramatta: John Holland, Alstom and Deutsche Bahn
- Greater Parramatta: Downer Rail, Keolis Downer, Downer Group, Ansaldo and CRRC Changchun Railway Vehicles
- Great River City Light Rail: Transdev Australasia, CAF and Laing O'Rourke

The winning bidders were announced in December 2018. The CPB/Downer joint venture will build the majority of the infrastructure, while Great River City Light Rail will build the depot, light rail stops and power systems, supply the vehicles, the signalling systems and operate the network. The total budget for stage 1 is A$2.4 billion.

Construction began in 2018, with the line expected to open in 2024.

In July 2018, work commenced on site remediation at the Camellia depot site. Major construction was originally planned to start in June 2020. This was brought forward to January 2020 and the first sod was turned on 31 January 2020.

Micro tunnelling will be used to build drainage and stormwater capacity underneath Church Street, to minimise construction impacts and disruptions in comparison to traditional pipeline construction such as excavating above the ground. The first micro-tunnel machine was launched in June 2020 from Centenary Square to Parramatta Town Hall and will connect to an existing pipe to extend stormwater capacity. A second micro-tunnel machine will also be launched from Centenary Square to Lennox Bridge to build drainage and stormwater capacity underneath Church Street.

Major construction of Stage 1 commenced at Westmead in July 2020.

=== Traffic changes ===
Traffic changes were implemented along and surrounding the light rail alignment as part of enabling works.

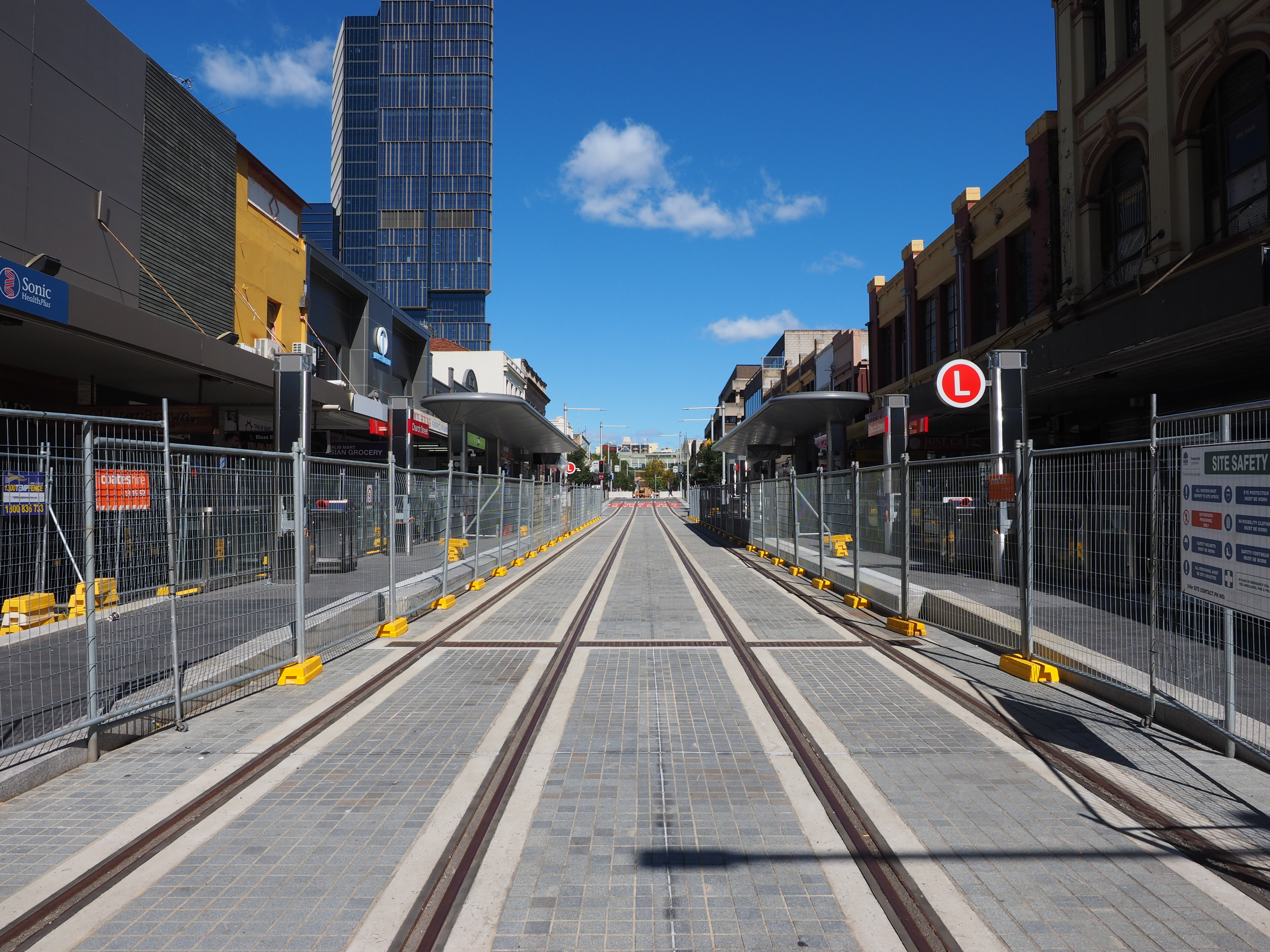
The partially opened pedestrianised section of the line along Church Street, April 2023

==== Church Street ====
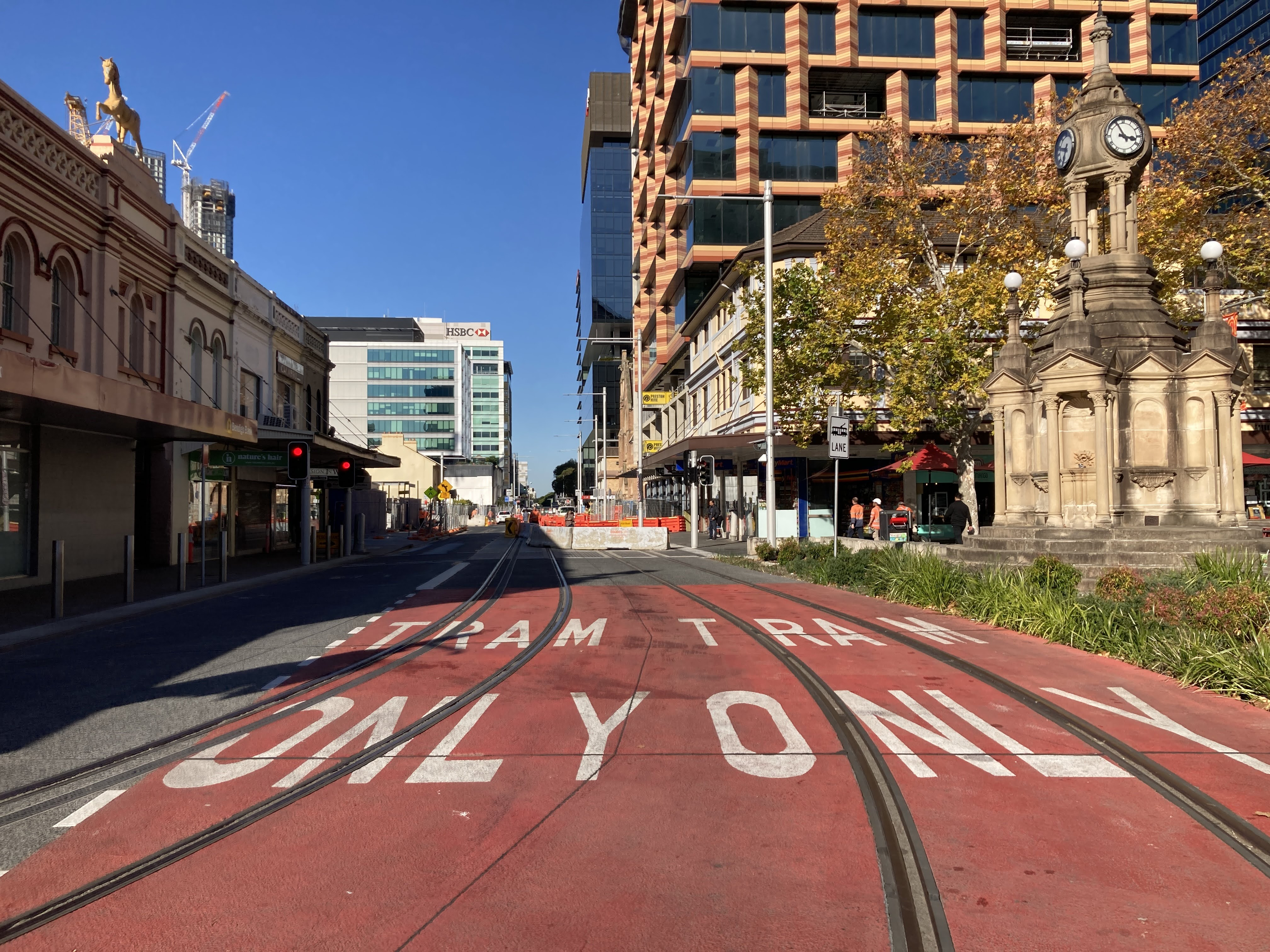
The partially opened section on Macquarie Street, May 2023

Church Street between Macquarie Street and Market Street became a pedestrian-only zone on 1 February 2020 prior to the start of major construction in June that year. This included "Eat Street", a section of Church Street between George Street and Lennox Bridge where restaurants and outdoor tables and seating are located. The NSW government previously stated that work on 'Eat Street' would not start until 2020. During construction, outdoor dining infrastructure along "Eat Street" would be removed and construction hoarding would be erected. The initial plan was, between 1 November to 31 January each year, 'Eat Street' would benefit from a construction 'grace period', when construction hoardings would be removed and outdoor tables and seating would be temporarily reintroduced. This was to ensure that business owners, diners, tourists and shoppers do not experience constant construction works during the busy holiday season. However, after consulting with the Parramatta Light Rail Business Reference Group and Eat Street businesses, the plan was changed to 'fast tracking' the works during the initial grace period and delaying the grace period. This would allow major construction to be completed earlier (scheduled in August 2021), followed by a delayed grace period, before installation of stops, testing and commissioning begins. The "Eat Street" reopened to outdoor dining in October 2021 following the lifting of COVID-19 lockdown restrictions.

Church Street between Barney Street and Victoria Road was closed to traffic on 3 July 2020. Bus services along Church Street were redirected to travel along O'Connell Street.

==== George Street ====
On 29 November 2019, George Street between O'Connell Street and Harris/Macarthur Street was converted from the existing one-way eastbound configuration into two-way traffic. The parking and the travel lanes along the southern side of George Street were temporarily removed one week prior, to allow eastbound motorists to get used to travelling on the northern side of George Street. The conversion of George Street to two-way traffic is to offset the loss of westbound lanes on Macquarie Street, which is along the light rail alignment.

==== O'Connell Street ====
In June 2020, works to widen O'Connell Street to four lanes between Barney Street and Albert Street were completed. The intersection of O'Connell Street and Barney Street was also reconstructed to allow continuous flow between both roads.

=== Bus service changes ===
After Church Street closed on 1 February 2020, the Parramatta free shuttle service 900 ran on a modified route, running along George Street instead of Macquarie Street.

=== Railway line closures ===
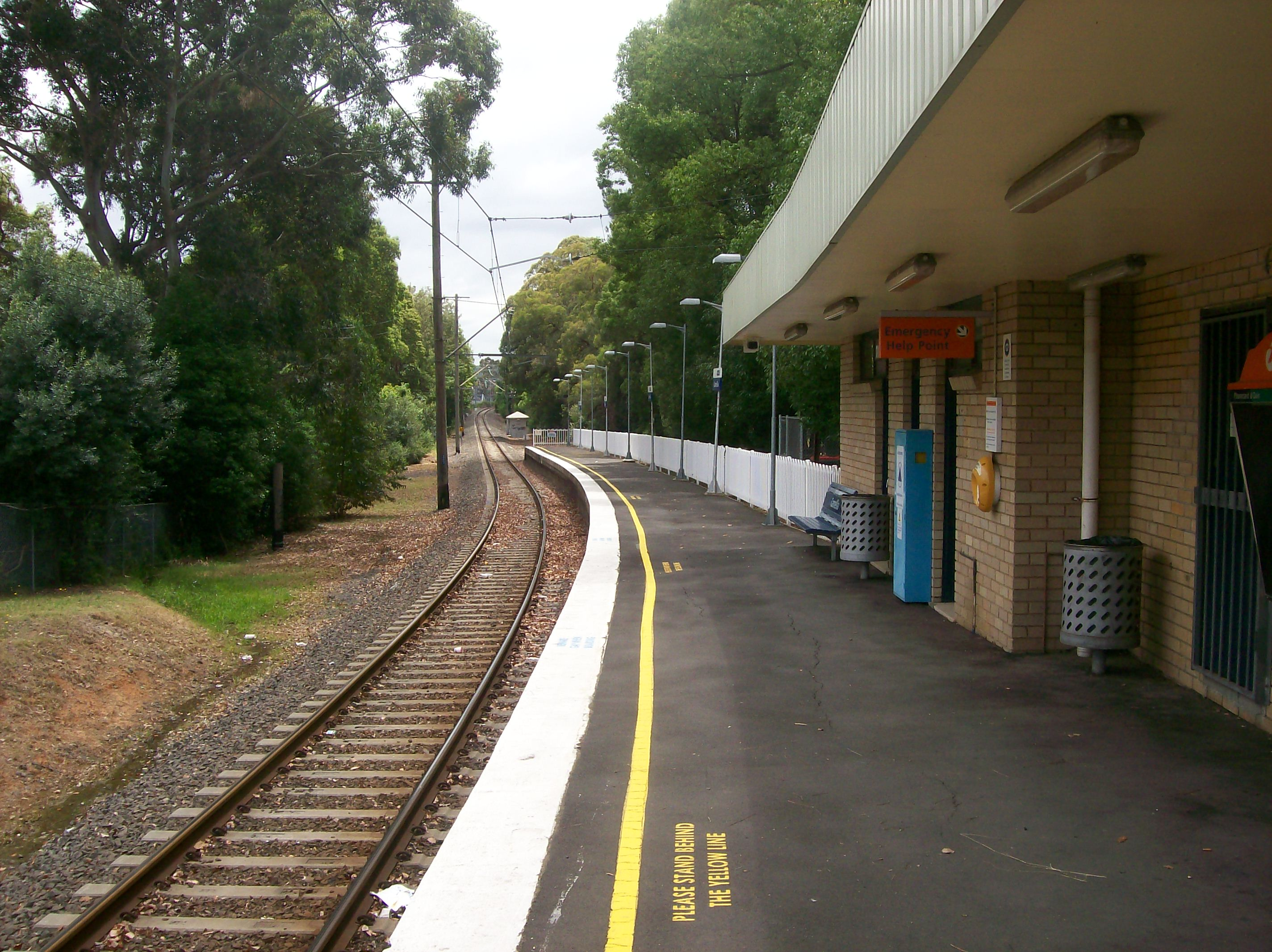
Camellia station on the Carlingford line. Most of the line became part of the Parramatta Light Rail.

The Carlingford and Sandown railway lines. The section of the Carlingford line converted to light rail is highlighted.

The northern branch to Carlingford reused most of the Carlingford railway line, which closed on 5 January 2020. The closure included Rosehill railway station, located between Clyde and Camellia, which will not be served by the light rail project. The level crossing across Parramatta Road was also removed later that month.

The Carlingford line was single track for most of its length, had shorter platforms than other lines in Sydney and had long been seen as under-utilised. Patronage declined from 446,000 journeys in 2001 to 260,000 journeys in 2014. 2016-17 patronage figures based on Opal card tap on and off data recorded 511,000 journeys on the line during the year. This placed the line last among all train lines in the Opal network. Various modification schemes to revitalise the line had been proposed. Action for Transport 2010, a New South Wales Government plan released in 1998, included the Parramatta Rail Link; a heavy rail line from Parramatta to Chatswood that would have utilised the Carlingford line between Camellia and Carlingford. As part of the CityRail Clearways Project announced in 2004, a passing loop was to have been built at Rydalmere, enabling a more frequent service. Neither scheme came to fruition.

The Sandown railway line was officially closed in June 2019 and removal of the line and tracks began in July 2019. This 1.5 kilometre line diverged from the Carlingford line at Camellia and ran close to the southern bank of the Parramatta River. Passenger services had ceased in December 1991, though the line's Rosehill platform remained in use for special charters, while freight trains ceased in June 2010 when trains from the Clyde Refinery last ran. The western end of the Sandown line was reutilised by the light rail to provide access to a tram stabling and maintenance facility.

=== Testing and opening ===
Testing of the light rail line began in December 2023. At the time, the line was expected to open in mid 2024. The final testing phase with trial running of operations began in July 2024.

In November 2024, during testing, an electrical wire fell onto a tram. Testing was halted, and equipment defects such as faulty joints were also discovered. On 3 December 2024, it was reported that the opening of stage 1 would be delayed to 2025 due to the defects. However, on 17 December 2024, the line received regulatory approval. Subsequently on the following day, the Minister for Transport, Jo Haylen, announced that the line will open on 20 December 2024. The first service commenced at 5:00 am at Westmead on opening day.

== Stage 2 construction ==
In September 2024, John Holland was announced as the preferred contractor for the construction of stage 2. Construction commenced in mid-2025 with F3 Parramatta River ferry services being suspended between Olympic Park and Parramatta on some days in October 2025 for electrical relocation.

== Stops ==
The line includes the following stops:

=== Westmead ===
Opened
2024
Transfer
Westmead railway station
Location
33°48′27.39″S 150°59′15.36″E

The Westmead stop is the terminus of the L4 Westmead & Carlingford line. It is located at the intersection of Hawkesbury Road and Railway Parade, and serves the suburb of Westmead, connecting to T1 North Shore & Western and T5 Cumberland line services operated by Sydney Trains and the future Sydney Metro West operated by Sydney Metro, stopping at Westmead station.

The stop was originally proposed to comprise one island platform and two side platforms, with a total of three platforms, however it was built with only two platforms in an island platform configuration. This stop also contains one of the 7 traction power substations that serve the line.

=== Westmead Hospital ===
Opened
2024
Transfer
None
Location
33°48′16.95″S 150°59′24.28″E

The Westmead Hospital stop serves the Westmead Hospital and is located north of the intersection of Caroline Street. The stop consists of two side platforms.

=== Childrens Hospital ===
Opened
2024
Transfer
None
Location
33°48′9.32″S 150°59′34.94″E

The Childrens Hospital stop is an island-platform station along Hainsworth Street which serves the Westmead Children's Hospital. During development, the stop was known as Children's Hospital at Westmead. The Darug word for infant, Gurung, was also proposed but rejected.

=== Ngara ===
Opened
2024
Transfer
None
Location
33°48′5.25″S 151°0′4.97″E

The Ngara stop, known as Cumberland Hospital during development, is located on Factory Street in the suburb of North Parramatta, and serves the Cumberland Hospital. The stop consists of two side platforms and was renamed during development to a Darug word meaning "To listen, to hear, think".

=== Benaud Oval ===
Opened
2024
Transfer
None
Location
33°48′2.91″S 151°0′16.41″E

The Benaud Oval stop, formerly Factory Street, is named after the nearby Richie Benaud Oval which the station also serves. Consisting of two side platforms, it is located on the corner of Factory Street and Church Street in North Parramatta and contains the second of the power substations.

=== Fennell Street ===
Opened
2024
Transfer
None
Location
33°48′18.68″S 151°0′20.99″E

The Fennell Street stop is located on the corner of Fennell Street and Church Street in the suburb of Parramatta. It consists of two side platforms.

=== Prince Alfred Square ===
Opened
2024
Transfer
None
Location
33°48′32.65″S 151°0′18.93″E

The Prince Alfred Square stop is located on Church Street adjacent to its namesake Prince Alfred Square, in the suburb of Parramatta. It serves the Western Sydney Stadium and consists of 2 side platforms.

=== Church Street ===
Opened
2024
Transfer
Parramatta metro station (from 2032)
Location
33°48′46.62″S 151°0′13.03″E

The Church Street stop, formerly known as Eat Street, serves the pedestrianised section of Church Street in the Parramatta CBD; most of the pedestrianised street excluding the station was opened in late 2021. The stop consists of two side platforms.

=== Parramatta Square ===
Opened
2024
Transfer
Parramatta railway station Parramatta metro station (from 2032)
Location
33°48′55.98″S 151°0′18.47″E

The Parramatta Square stop is located within the Parramatta CBD. Consisting of two side platforms, Parramatta Square lies between Parramatta railway station and the future Parramatta metro station and will be directly connected to both by the proposed Civic Link. Parramatta Square stop contains a traction substation.

=== Robin Thomas ===
Opened
2024
Transfer
None
Location
33°49′0.91″S 151°0′40.35″E

The Robin Thomas stop, known as Harris Street during development, is located at the intersection between Macquarie Street and Harris Street in Parramatta. It consists of two side platforms, and is located directly before the line takes two sharp 90 degree turns onto Harris, then George Street. It is named after the nearby Robin Thomas Reserve.

=== Tramway Avenue ===
Opened
2024
Transfer
None
Location
33°49′1.95″S 151°1′6.63″E

The Tramway Avenue stop is located after two pairs of adjacent 90 degree turns on the line, on its namesake street. Directly after this station towards Carlingford, the street-running section ends at Bidgee Bidgee Bridge (formerly James Ruse Drive Bridge), named after an Indigenous tribal leader. The 5.7 km (3.5 mi) long shared path (formally called the Carlingford Light Rail Active Transport Link) to Carlingford begins at Tramway Avenue, and the stop contains the fourth power substation. Initially planned to have an island platform, the design was revised in 2018 to have two side platforms.

=== Rosehill Gardens ===
Opened
2024
Transfer
None
Location
33°49′5.3″S 151°1′28.16″E

The Rosehill Gardens stop, formerly known as Camellia, is the first station (towards Carlingford) located on the reused section of the former heavy rail suburban Carlingford railway line, and is located north of the former Camellia railway station. The station consists of two side platforms and serves the nearby Rosehill Gardens Racecourse, which the station is named after. South of Rosehill Gardens, a triangle junction connects the light rail line to a stabling and maintenance facility at Camellia via a reused section of the former Sandown railway line. Parramatta Light Rail Stage 2 is planned to also connect with Stage 1 using the same railway line and junction.

=== Yallamundi ===
Opened
2024
Transfer
None
Location
33°48′35.86″S 151°1′45.37″E

The Yallamundi stop, formerly known as Rydalmere, is located in the suburb of Rydalmere and continues along the reused section of the Carlingford line. It consists of two side platforms and is situated on the site of the former Rydalmere railway station; Yallamundi takes its name from a Darug word meaning storytelling, and primarily serves the nearby Western Sydney University South Parramatta Campus.

=== Dundas ===
Opened
2024
Transfer
None
Location
33°48′13.71″S 151°1′59.59″E

The Dundas stop is located just south of Kissing Point Road and consists of two side platforms as well as another power substation and a backup operational control centre in case of maintenance facility malfunctions. The stop retains the former Dundas railway station building as it is heritage-listed, and is the only stop along the former Carlingford line with such infrastructure. The stop serves the suburb of Dundas.

=== Telopea ===
Opened
2024
Transfer
None
Location
33°47′39.87″S 151°2′28.06″E

The Telopea stop serves the suburb of Telopea, and consists of two side platforms as well as the final traction power substation along the line from Westmead. The stop is also situated on the site of the former Telopea railway station. North of the station is the only single-track section on the line; the original Carlingford railway line was single-track, and as a consequence the construction of the major arterial Pennant Hills Road above this section of railway was built to accommodate only one track, preventing modification or removal of the bridge. The stop contains a traction power substation.

=== Carlingford ===
Opened
2024
Transfer
None
Location
33°46′55.09″S 151°2′49.85″E

The Carlingford stop is the terminus of the L4 Westmead & Carlingford Line. The single track splits back into two on the immediate approach to the stop, and Carlingford therefore consists of two side platforms. The line itself extends briefly past the stop which allows trams to be stabled without affecting passenger services. Carlingford contains a traction power substation.

The stop is located on the site of the former Carlingford railway station. It is also the terminus of the aforementioned Active Transport shared path and serves the suburb of Carlingford.
