= The Bays metro station =

Proposed railway station for the Sydney Metro West line

The Bays

General information
- Location: Bays Precinct; Australia
- Coordinates: 33°52′02″S 151°10′44″E
- Owner: Transport Asset Manager of New South Wales
- Line: Sydney Metro West
- Platforms: 2
- Tracks: 2

Construction
- Structure type: Underground
- Accessible: Yes

Other information
- Status: Under construction
- Website: www.sydneymetro.info

Services
Preceding station	Sydney Metro	Following station
Five Dock towards Westmead	Sydney Metro West	Pyrmont towards Hunter Street
Location

The Bays metro station is an underground Sydney Metro station currently under construction. Located on the Sydney Metro West line, it will serve the Bays Precinct. It is to be built between Glebe Island and White Bay Power Station and is scheduled to open with the rest of the line in 2032.

There will be one new station entrance towards the south of White Bay, close to the proposed future Bays Waterfront Promenade.
