= North Strathfield railway station =

Railway station in Sydney, New South Wales, Australia

North Strathfield
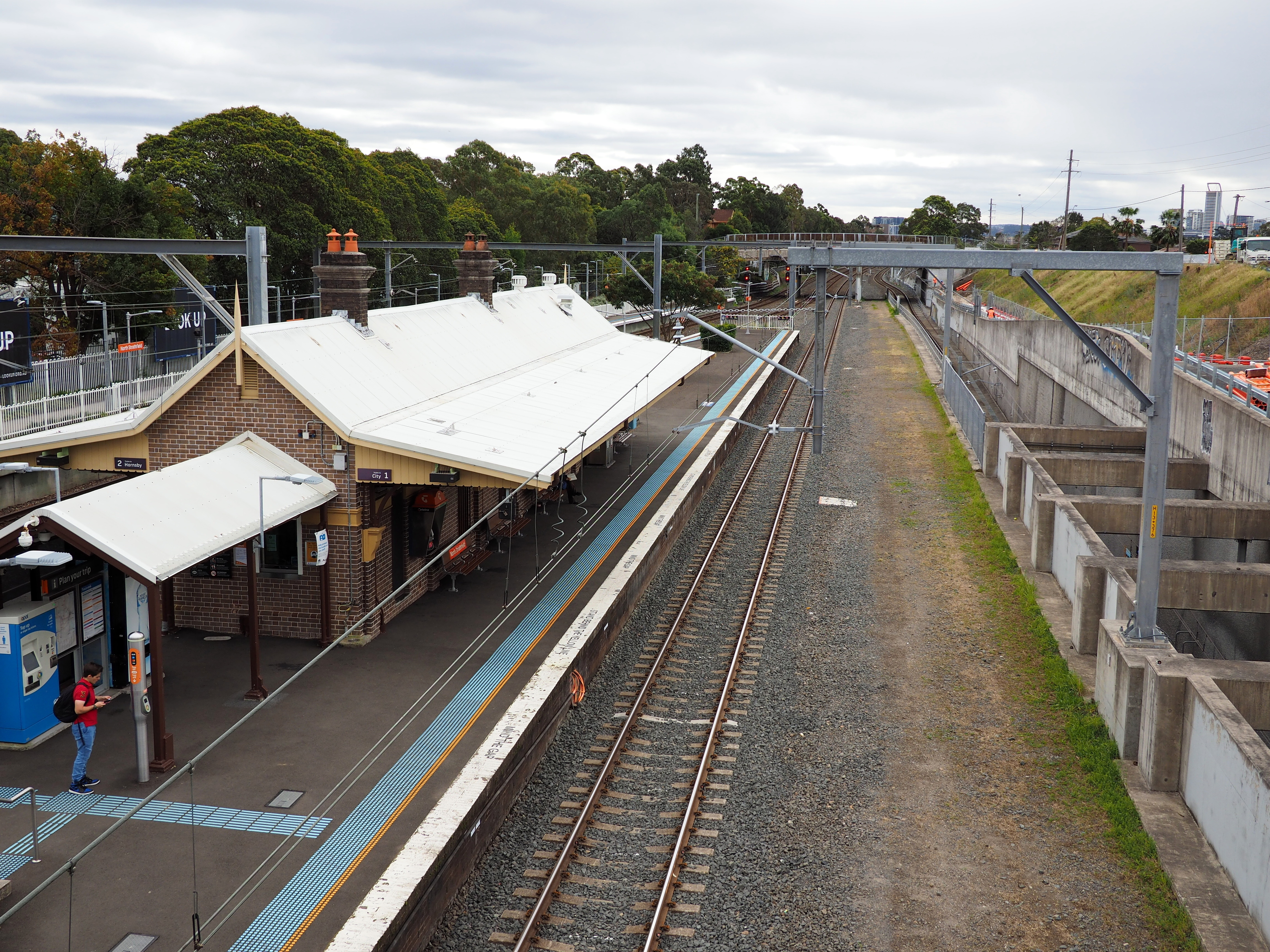
- Northbound view of Platform 1 and station building in July 2022

General information
- Location: Queen Street, North Strathfield; Sydney, New South Wales; Australia
- Coordinates: 33°51′32″S 151°05′17″E
- Elevation: 19 metres (62 ft)
- Owner: Transport Asset Manager of NSW
- Operator: Sydney Trains
- Line: Main North
- Distance: 13.38 km (8.31 mi) from Central
- Platforms: 3 (1 island, 1 side)
- Tracks: 4

Construction
- Structure type: Ground
- Accessible: Yes

Other information
- Status: Weekdays: Staffed: 6am to 7pm: Weekends and public holidays: Staffed: 8am to 4pm
- Station code: NST
- Website: Transport for NSW

History
- Opened: 9 June 1918 (108 years ago)
- Electrified: Yes (from January 1929)

Passengers
- 2025: 1,416,548 (year); 3,881 (daily) (Sydney Trains)
- Rank: 103

Services
Preceding station	Sydney Trains	Following station
Concord West towards Hornsby	Northern Line	Strathfield towards Gordon via Central
Future services
Preceding station	Sydney Metro	Following station
Olympic Park towards Westmead	Sydney Metro West	Burwood North towards Hunter Street
Location

North Strathfield railway station is a suburban railway station located on the Main North line, serving the Sydney suburb of North Strathfield. It is served by Sydney Trains T9 Northern Line services.

== History ==
The Homebush to Hornsby section of the Main North railway line was first opened in 1886, and a connection from the Main North railway line to Strathfield to the east was subsequently added. North Strathfield station was added to the line much later: it opened on 9 June 1918 as an island platform with two faces. In 1924, a third platform was added on the western side. Added to the line much later, it is now the first station on the Main Northern line after it branches from the Main Suburban line at Strathfield.

Today, the primary, eastern, connection between the Main Northern and Main Suburban lines is from North Strathfield and Strathfield, but the single track western connection between North Strathfield and Homebush still exists. This connection is mainly used by out of service or freight trains but was occasionally used by passenger trains travelling to Olympic Park station during trackwork or for major events at Sydney Olympic Park.

To the east of the station lay an out of use passing loop, but in June 2015 was recommissioned as part of the construction of a dive south of the station as part of the Northern Sydney Freight Corridor project.

As part of the Sydney Metro West project, a further two underground platforms will be built.

As part of the accesbility projects, the station was upgraded and given lifts in November 2019.

== Services ==
=== Platforms ===
Platform	Line	Stopping pattern	Notes
1	Northern Line (Sydney)	Southbound services to Gordon via Strathfield & North Sydney	
2	Northern Line (Sydney)	Northbound services to Hornsby	
3	Northern Line (Sydney)	2 morning peak and 16 afternoon peak services to Hornsby	

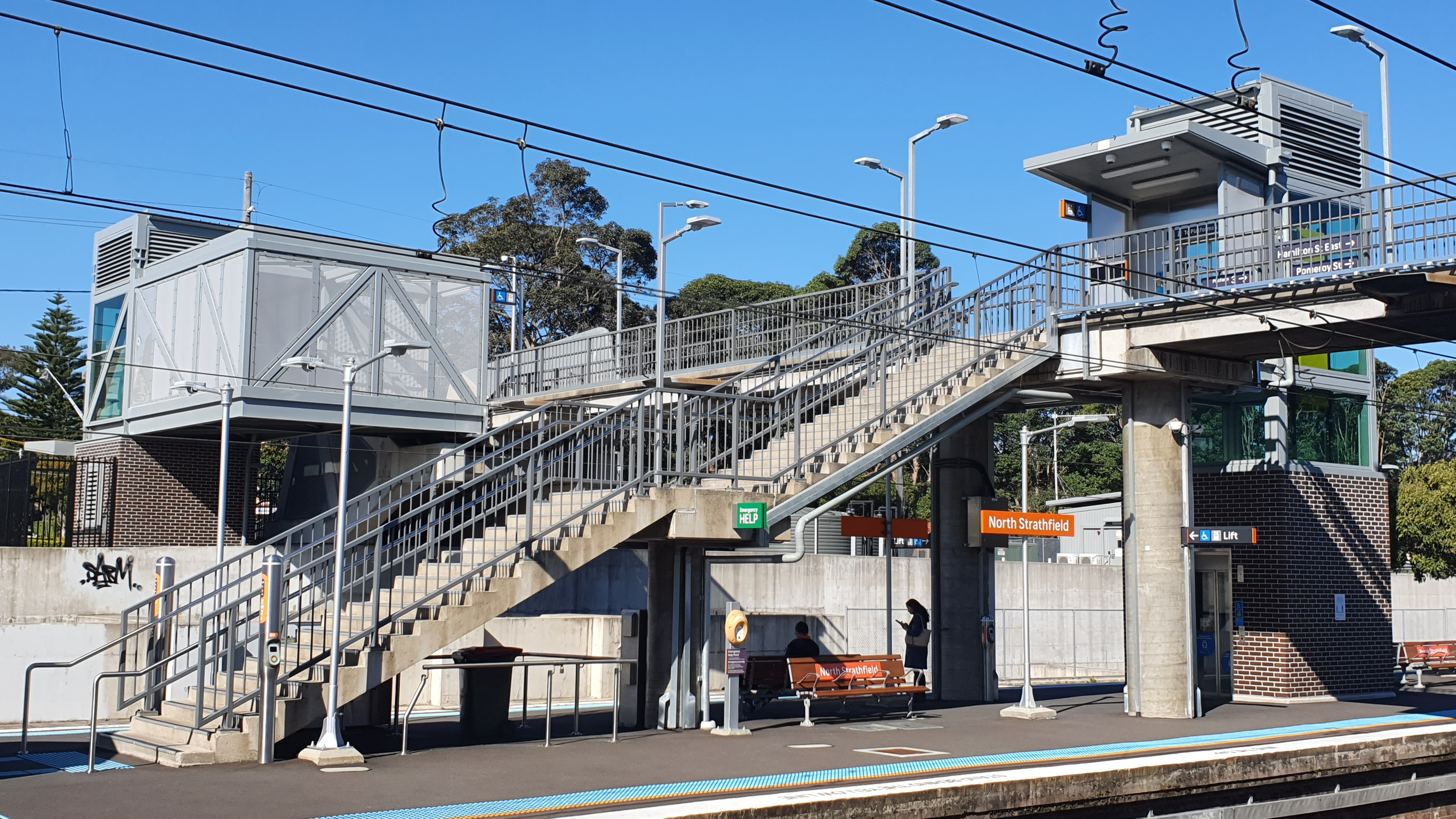
Entrance
