= Stadio Olimpico (disambiguation) =

Stadio Olimpico is a stadium in Rome, Italy

Stadio Olimpico may also refer to:

- Stadio Olimpico (San Marino), a multi-purpose stadium in Serravalle, San Marino
- Stadio Olimpico Grande Torino, a multi-purpose stadium in Turin, Italy
- Stadio Olimpico Carlo Zecchini, a multi-use stadium in Grosseto, Italy
- Stadio Olimpico del Ghiaccio, an open air Figure skating arena in Cortina d'Ampezzo, Italy
- Stadio Olimpico del Nuoto, an aquatics centre at the Foro Italico in Rome, Italy

== See also ==
- Estadio Olímpico (disambiguation)
- Olympic Stadium (disambiguation)
- Ciclista Olímpico
