= Five Dock metro station =

Proposed railway station in Sydney, Australia

Five Dock

General information
- Location: Great North Road, Five Dock; Australia
- Coordinates: 33°52′03″S 151°07′46″E
- Owner: Transport Asset Manager of New South Wales
- Line: Sydney Metro West
- Platforms: 2
- Tracks: 2

Construction
- Structure type: Underground
- Accessible: Yes

Other information
- Status: Under construction
- Website: www.sydneymetro.info

Services
Preceding station	Sydney Metro	Following station
Burwood North towards Westmead	Sydney Metro West	The Bays towards Hunter Street
Location

Five Dock metro station is an underground Sydney Metro station currently under construction. It will serve the suburb of Five Dock on the Sydney Metro West line. It is scheduled to open with the rest of the line in 2032.

Five Dock Station is to be built off Great North Road, between East Street and then at the corner of Second Avenue and Waterview Street. There will be one station entrance at Fred Kelly Place, off Great North Road.
