= Sydney Olympic Park station =

Sydney Olympic Park station may refer to:

- Olympic Park railway station, Sydney, a station opened in 1998
- Sydney Olympic Park metro station, a proposed station set to open in 2032
