= Burwood North metro station =

Proposed railway station in Sydney, Australia

Burwood North
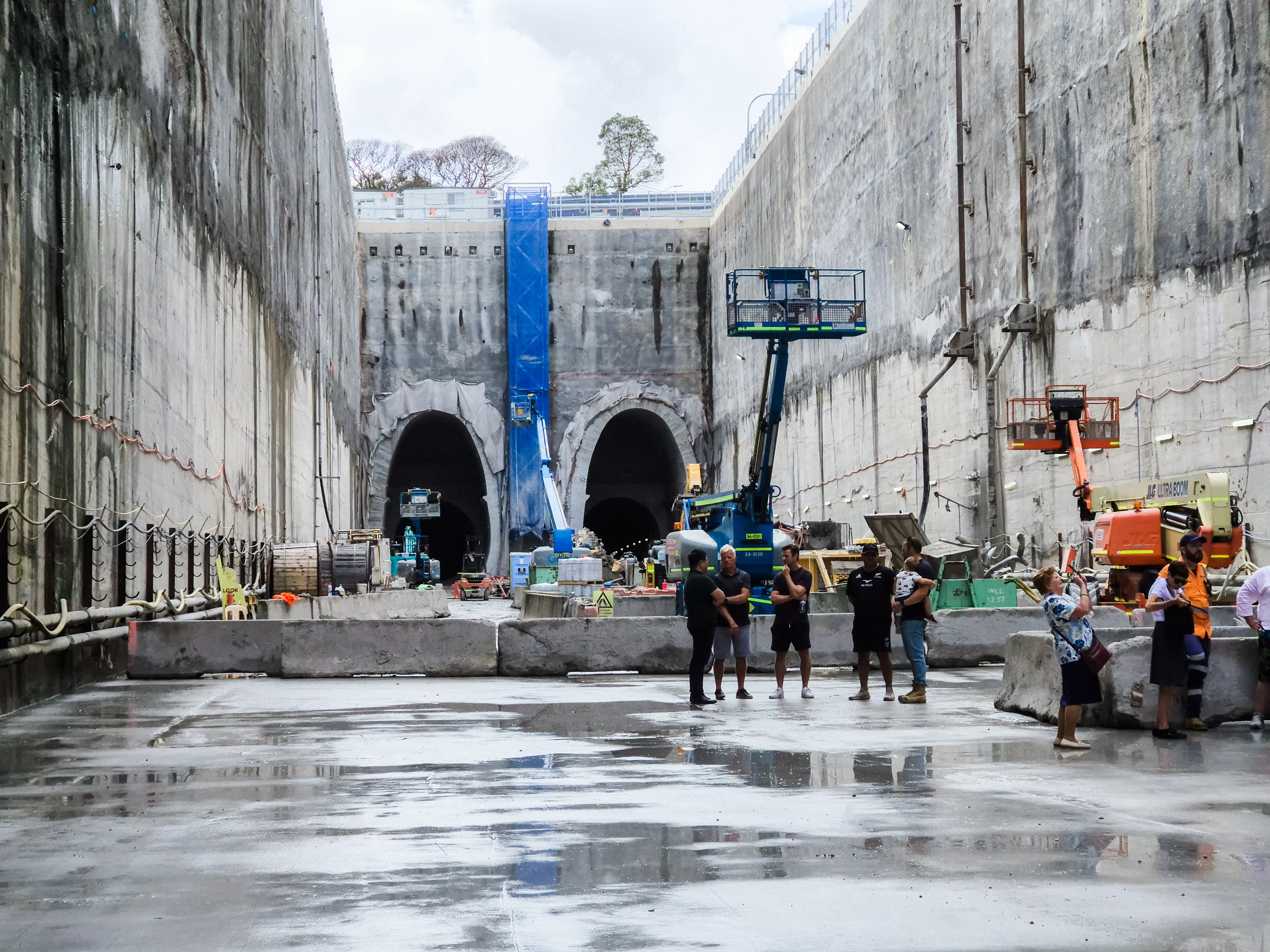
- Station construction site on 9 March 2025 at a community open day

General information
- Location: Corner Burwood Road & Parramatta Road, Concord, New South Wales; Australia
- Coordinates: 33°52′07″S 151°06′21″E
- Owner: Transport Asset Manager of New South Wales
- Line: Sydney Metro West
- Platforms: 2
- Tracks: 2

Construction
- Structure type: Underground
- Accessible: Yes

Other information
- Status: Under construction
- Website: www.sydneymetro.info

Services
Preceding station	Sydney Metro	Following station
North Strathfield towards Westmead	Sydney Metro West	Five Dock towards Hunter Street
Location

Burwood North metro station is an underground Sydney Metro station currently under construction. Located on the Sydney Metro West line, it will serve the suburb of Burwood. It will be located on the corner of Burwood Road and Parramatta Road and is scheduled to open with the rest of the line in 2032.

The two new entrances will be located on both the north and south sides of Parramatta Road.
