= Parramatta metro station =

Under construction railway station in Sydney, Australia

Parramatta
- Construction site as seen from the Powerhouse Museum in November 2026.

General information
- Location: Parramatta, New South Wales; Australia
- Coordinates: 33°48′53″S 151°00′16″E
- Owner: Transport Asset Manager of New South Wales
- Line: Sydney Metro West
- Platforms: 2
- Tracks: 2
- Connections: Parramatta; Parramatta Square

Construction
- Structure type: Underground
- Accessible: Yes

Other information
- Status: Under construction
- Website: www.sydneymetro.info

Services
| Preceding station | Sydney Metro | Following station |
|---|---|---|
| Westmead Terminus | Sydney Metro West | Olympic Park towards Hunter Street |
Location

Parramatta metro station is an underground Sydney Metro station currently under construction. Located on the Sydney Metro West line, it will serve the Parramatta central business district. It is to be built within the block bounded by George, Macquarie, Church and Smith streets, to the north of the existing Parramatta railway station. An entrance is proposed to be built on Horwood Place, with other potential entrances still to be determined (as of March 2020). The metro station is anticipated to increase capacity at Parramatta railway station by relieving demand in peak times. It is scheduled to open with the rest of the line in 2032.
