= Olympic Park (disambiguation) =

An Olympic Park is the central sports complex of an Olympic Games (and that article includes a list of Olympic Parks).

Olympic Park or Olympic Park Stadium may also refer to:

== Olympic parks and stadia called "Olympic Park" ==
=== Australia ===
- Olympic Park (Village), Heidelberg, Melbourne, built for the 1956 Olympics
- Olympic Park Stadium (Melbourne), built for the 1956 Olympics
- Sydney Olympic Park, New South Wales, developed for the 2000 Olympics and Paralympics
- Olympic Park railway line
  - Olympic Park railway station, Sydney
  - Sydney Olympic Park metro station
  - Blacktown Olympic Park, near Sydney

=== Canada ===
- Canada Olympic Park, Calgary, Alberta, built for the 1988 Winter Olympics
- Olympic Park, Montreal built for the 1976 Olympics
- Whistler Olympic Park, British Columbia, built for the 2010 Winter Olympics

=== China ===
- Olympic Green, or Beijing Olympic Park, built for the 2008 Summer Olympics
- Olympic Forest Park, located North of Olympic Green in Beijing, built for the 2008 Summer Olympics

=== Germany ===
- Olympiapark (Munich), built for the 1972 Olympics

=== Italy ===
- Torino Olympic Park, built for the 2006 Winter Olympics

=== Japan ===
- Komazawa Olympic Park, Tokyo, built for the 1964 Olympics
  - Komazawa Olympic Park Stadium

=== Norway ===
- Olympic Park, the area around Stampesletta, Lillehammer, used in the 1994 Winter Olympics

=== Russia ===
- Sochi Olympic Park, built for the 2014 Winter Olympics and Winter Paralympics
  - Imeretinsky Kurort railway station, formerly Olympic Park railway station, Sochi, Russia

=== South Korea ===
- Olympic Park, Seoul, built for the 1998 Olympics
  - Olympic Park station (Seoul), Seoul
- Gangneung Olympic Park, PyeongChang, built for the 2018 Winter Olympics

=== United Kingdom ===
- Queen Elizabeth Olympic Park, London, built for the 2012 Olympics and Paralympics

=== United States ===
- Centennial Olympic Park, Atlanta, Georgia, built for the 1996 Olympics
- Utah Olympic Park, Salt Lake City, built for the 2002 Winter Olympics

== Other places called "Olympic Park" ==
- Olympic Park (Buffalo), former baseball stadiums in Buffalo, New York, US
- Olympic National Park, on the Olympic Peninsula, Seattle, Washington, US
- Olympic Sculpture Park, Seattle, Washington, US
- Olympic Park Neighborhood Council, representing the Olympic Park neighborhood of Los Angeles, US
- Olympic Park (New Jersey), an amusement park which existed in the 19th and 20th centuries in New Jersey, US

== See also ==
- Olympic (disambiguation)
- Park (disambiguation)
- Olympic Park railway station (disambiguation)
