= Pyrmont metro station =

Under construction Sydney metro station

Pyrmont

General information
- Location: Pyrmont Bridge Rd, Pyrmont; Australia
- Coordinates: 33°52′12″S 151°11′48″E
- Owner: Transport Asset Manager of New South Wales
- Operator: Metro Trains Sydney
- Line: Sydney Metro West
- Platforms: 2
- Tracks: 2
- Connections: Pyrmont Bay; Pyrmont Bay

Construction
- Structure type: Underground
- Accessible: yes

Other information
- Status: Under construction
- Website: www.sydneymetro.com.info

History
- Opening: Planned 2032

Services
Preceding station	Sydney Metro	Following station
The Bays towards Westmead	Sydney Metro West	Hunter Street Terminus
Location

Pyrmont metro station is an underground Sydney Metro station currently under construction. It will serve the suburb of Pyrmont as part of the Sydney Metro West line. The station is under construction between Pyrmont Bridge Road and Union Street, and is scheduled to open alongside the rest of the line in 2032. Once opened, the station will provide access to the Darling Harbour precinct, with connections to light rail services to the CBD and Dulwich Hill, alongside ferry services to Circular Quay. In February 2024, preliminary concepts for over station development featuring a mixed-use 31 story tower were released for public consultation.
