= Bays Precinct =

Redevelopment project in Sydney

The Bays Precinct "destinations" used by UrbanGrowth NSW planners.

The Bays Precinct is a proposed urban renewal project in Sydney, Australia. It will involve the redevelopment of 95 hectares of land adjoining Sydney Harbour formerly used by industry surrounding Blackwattle Bay. Among the sites to be redeveloped are the Rozelle railway yards, White Bay Power Station, Glebe Island port, the Sydney Fish Market and Wentworth Park.

== History ==
In November 2014, the Government of New South Wales conducted a summit to formulate a plan for the precinct. In February 2017 expressions of interest in developing a masterplan for the first nine hectares were called for.

== Transport ==
As part of the Sydney Metro West rapid transit line, a station will be built in the precinct. In 2015, it was suggested the Glebe Island Bridge could be reopened as part of a plan to extend the Inner West Light Rail.
