= Rogans Hill =

District within Sydney, Australia

Coordinates: 33°44′S 151°01′E

Rogans Hill is a small district within the suburb of Cherrybrook in Sydney, New South Wales, Australia within Hornsby Shire, and was named after John Rogan, a pioneer who had been given a grant of land in the area by Governor Macquarie in 1818. Its main attractions include The Hermitage, Oakhill College, Oakhill Drive Public School and the Anglican Retirement Villages. It was the destination of a railway line (the Rogans Hill line) which closed in 1932.

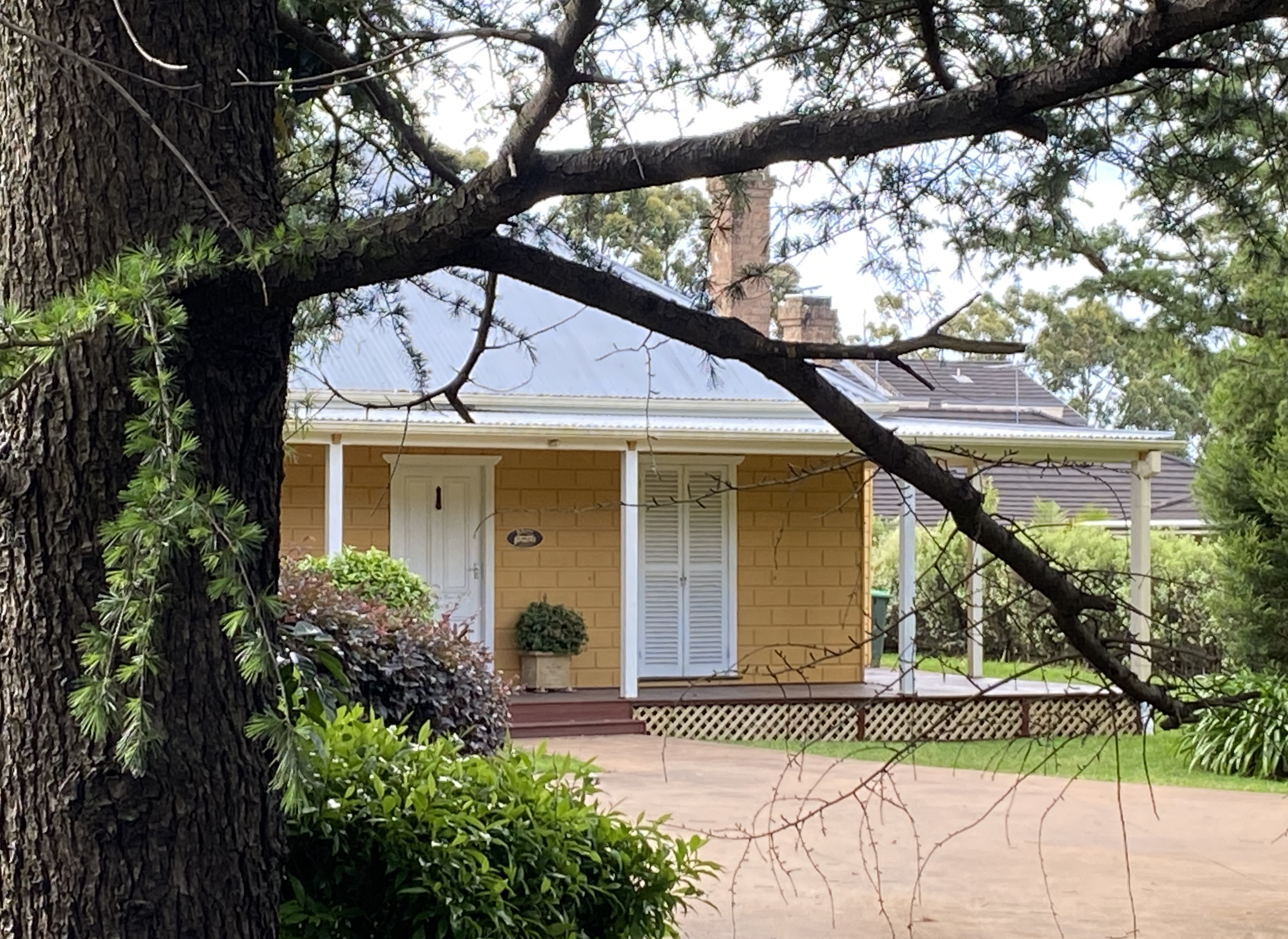
The Hermitage, Rogans Hill, Cherrybrook

Rogans Hill is also sometimes referred to as Oakhill.
