= Rogans Hill railway line =

Former rail line in Australia

Overview
- Termini: Westmead railway station; Rogans Hill

History
- Opened: 24 November 1924
- Closed: 31 January 1932

Technical
- Line length: 37 km (23 mi)
- Track gauge: 1,435 mm (4 ft 8 1/2 in)

The Rogans Hill railway line was a short-lived railway line in the north-western suburbs of Sydney, Australia.

== History ==
A steam tramway opened between Parramatta and Baulkham Hills in 1902, and was extended to Castle Hill in 1910, carrying passengers and produce to and from the area. This tramway departed at Argyle Street in Parramatta and tracked north along Church Street to Northmead, then along Windsor Road and Old Northern Road to Castle Hill. In 1919, the NSW government decided to convert the tramway into a railway to encourage the subdivision of estates for residential use. This involved building a new railway from the Main Western line at Westmead to Northmead on a new right-of way, and then converting the tramway to railway standard along the existing route to Castle Hill. The new section between Westmead and Northmead was built in 1922, and the line opened to traffic to Castle Hill in 1923. It was extended to Rogans Hill in 1924 on a new right-of-way. Stations were built at Mons Road (on the corner of Old Windsor Road), Northmead (on the corner of Briens Road and Windsor Road), Moxhams Road (at Windsor Road), Model Farms Road, Junction Road, Baulkham Hills, Cross Street, Southleigh (at Excelsior and Old Northern Roads), Parsonage Road, Castle Hill and Rogans Hill. The line was single track throughout, and ran alongside Windsor and Old Northern Roads between Northmead and Castle Hill. An island platform and crossing loop was provided at Baulkham Hills station. Most of the stations were short 20 metre (70 feet) wooden platforms. An office, waiting room and signal box were provided on the island platform at Baulkham Hills.

Passenger service initially consisted of a steam locomotive (20 Class) hauling 3 wooden passenger cars. In latter years, CPH railmotors were used.

The line proved to be unsuccessful – unlike the tramway, goods traffic was not carried and the stations were too sparsely spread to be as convenient as the tram it replaced. The rise of motor traffic on the adjacent roadway, which was not divided from the railway, also assisted in the line's demise. Passengers preferred the new and faster motor buses which could take them directly to businesses in Parramatta, and the line closed on 31 January 1932.

The district that the line served is now substantially developed, and is a region of Sydney deficient in fixed-rail public transport infrastructure. A railway to the Hills District was opened in May 2019 to remedy this, but following a different alignment.

== What remains ==
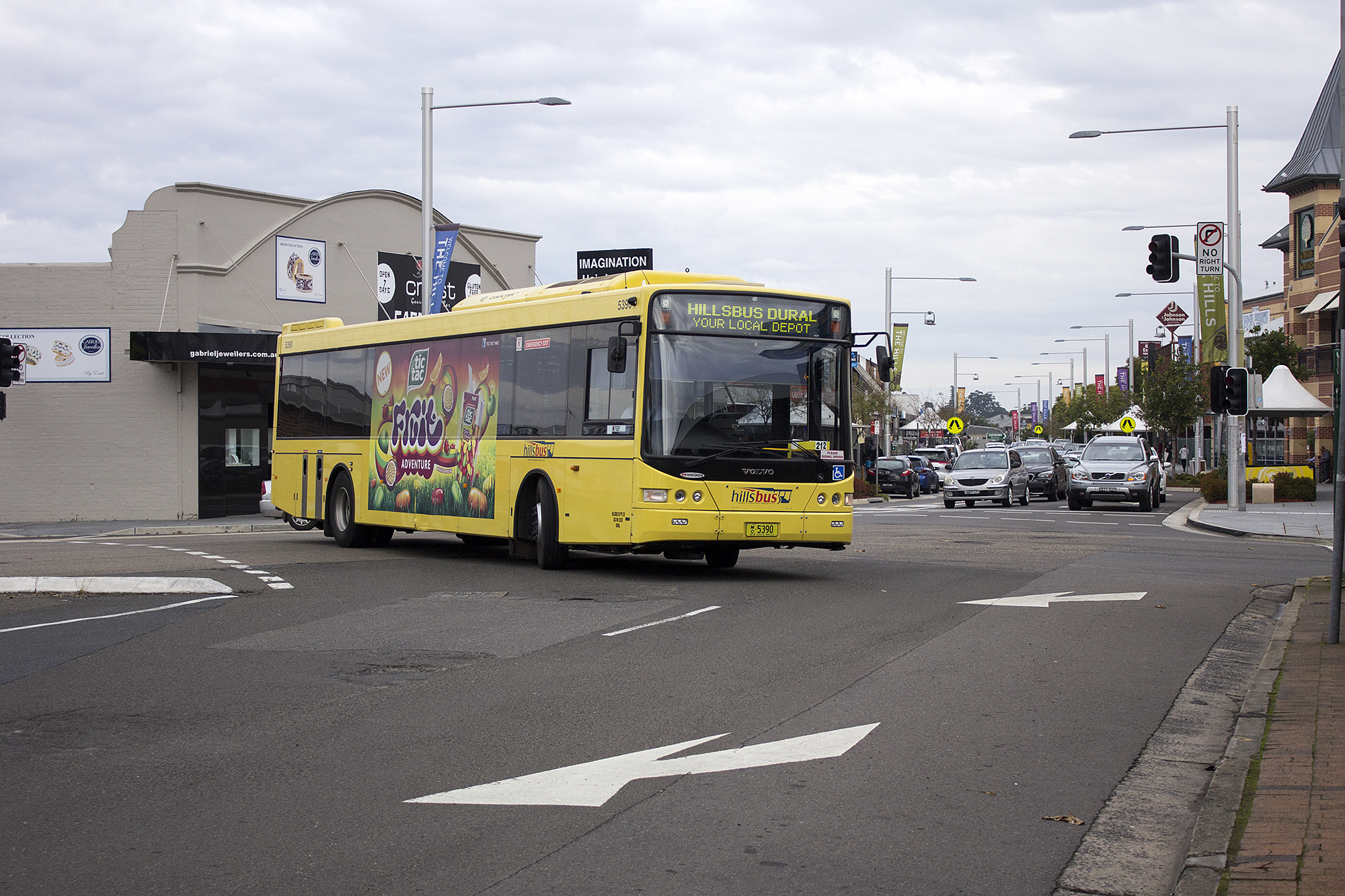
Rails remain in the pavement, near Castle Hill Bus interchange.

Little trace remains of the line, the route having been absorbed by road widening and residential development. The abutments and two concrete piers for the rail bridge over Toongabbie Creek still stand between Westmead and Northmead. There is also a well preserved wall of the cutting in the council car park off Raemot Lane in Baulkham Hills.

Modelfarms siding reserve is a remnant of the station that once was there. On the corner of Windsor rd and model farms rd it was the old railway siding before the road was widened later.

Rails remain in the pavement near Castle Hill Bus interchange.

A plaque has now been erected, on sleepers and old rails, at the site of the Castle Hill metro station, with pictures of the line during its 30-year existence along with a short history.

== See also ==
- Railways in Sydney
- Sydney Metro Northwest
