= Sydney Metro West =

Under construction rapid transit railway line

Overview
- Status: Under construction
- Owner: Transport for NSW
- Locale: Sydney, New South Wales, Australia
- Stations: 9

Service
- Type: Rapid transit
- System: Sydney Metro

History
- Work began: November 2020
- Planned opening: 2032

Technical
- Line length: 24 km (14.9 mi)
- Electrification: 25 kV 50 Hz AC from overhead catenary
Route map
All Metro stations will
have wheelchair access

Sydney Metro West is a rapid transit underground rail project currently under construction in Sydney, New South Wales, Australia. It involves constructing a rail line from Hunter St in the northern Sydney City Centre (CBD) to Westmead in the western suburbs of Greater Sydney. The new underground railway line will generally run parallel to the existing Main Suburban and Main Western railway lines, but via different suburbs and different stations, with the main aims being the doubling of rail capacity between the City Centre and Greater Western Sydney and the relief of overcrowding on the Western Line. The line will form part of the Sydney Metro system. Early construction began in 2020, with tunnelling starting in 2023. The line is anticipated to open from 2032.

== History ==
In September 2016, media reported that a new Metro line would link the city of Parramatta with the Sydney CBD. The second phase of the Parramatta Light Rail between Camellia and Strathfield via Sydney Olympic Park would be deferred as a consequence of the new line.

On 14 November 2016, the Baird government announced the Sydney Metro West project, with station locations including Parramatta, Sydney Olympic Park, the Bays Precinct and the Sydney CBD itself. Work would begin on planning the line, with the preferred alignment scheduled to be announced in late 2018, and a expected opening date in the "second half of the 2020s". The government proposed a value capture scheme to help pay for the project. The contributions from value capture were expected to amount to between 10 and 15 percent of the capital cost. Construction was originally planned to begin by 2022.

During the state election campaign in March 2019, the Liberal/National Coalition government announced a funding of $6.4 billion to the project and commitment to start construction earlier in 2020, if re-elected. The Labor opposition also announced its commitment to fund the project if it won the election, at the expense of cancelling other announced transport and road projects such as the Beaches Link. With the Coalition state government re-elected its 2019-2020 state budget reaffirmed the government's commitment and funding of $6.4 billion over four years to the project, with construction to be fast-tracked to start in 2020.

=== Planning ===
Planning approval process of the project was done in stages due to the size of the project. In March 2018, the government expanded the project scope, including:

- an additional station at Westmead
- a new station that would connect to existing stations, either at Concord West or North Strathfield
- an interchange at the western end of the line, connecting with the existing railway stations at either Westmead or Parramatta

Other options for new metro stations included Camellia/Rydalmere, North Burwood/Five Dock, Kings Bay (Five Dock) and Pyrmont. Media reports indicated that Martin Place would be the main CBD interchange. During the state election campaign in March 2019, the government announced new stations at Five Dock, North Burwood and North Strathfield.

On 21 October 2019, the locations of seven stations were announced:

- Bays Precinct
- Five Dock
- Burwood North
- North Strathfield
- Sydney Olympic Park
- Parramatta
- Westmead

At the time of announcement, the government was considering further stations at Pyrmont and Rydalmere. A stabling and maintenance facility and a service facility was also proposed to be built at Clyde, adjacent to the Auburn Maintenance Centre, and Silverwater respectively. The Clyde facility would be on the site of Sydney Speedway, which would be demolished, and would be accessed from the main tunnels via the former Carlingford railway line corridor. Initial work was expected to start in 2020, with tunnelling to begin in 2022. As at December 2023, the line is scheduled to open to in 2032.

According to media reports, in 2019 the government decided to abandon plans for a second CBD station at Central Station, and plans for the line to run further to the south-east, with a station at Zetland.

On 30 April 2020, the project's Environmental Impact Statement (EIS) was released to the public for exhibition. The Rydalmere station option was confirmed scrapped due to the cost of extra 3 kilometres (1.9 mi) of tunneling and the increase in commuter travel times. Parramatta City Council has also urged the government to build a station at Camellia to trigger urban renewal of the precinct.

The Pyrmont station option was confirmed by the government on 11 December 2020. The station is likely to be close to The Star casino, and will likely involve an office and retail development above the station. The station location is subject to further planning and design work. In May 2021, stations at Pyrmont and Hunter Street were announced.

In conjunction with the December 2023 release of the Sydney Metro Review, a station at Rosehill was formally proposed, along with one possible other station west of Sydney Olympic Park. The Rosehill station was slated to be constructed at the current site of the Rosehill Gardens Racecourse, in conjunction with a development plan that includes approximately 25,000 residential units. The plan was formally rejected by the Australian Turf Club members in May 2025.

In March 2021, planning approvals were granted to the project concept between Westmead and the CBD, and station excavation and tunnelling between Westmead and The Bays. Future planning stages will seek approval for major civil construction works including station excavation and tunnelling between The Bays and the CBD, tunnel fit-out, station building, and operation of the line between Westmead and the CBD.

== Project description ==
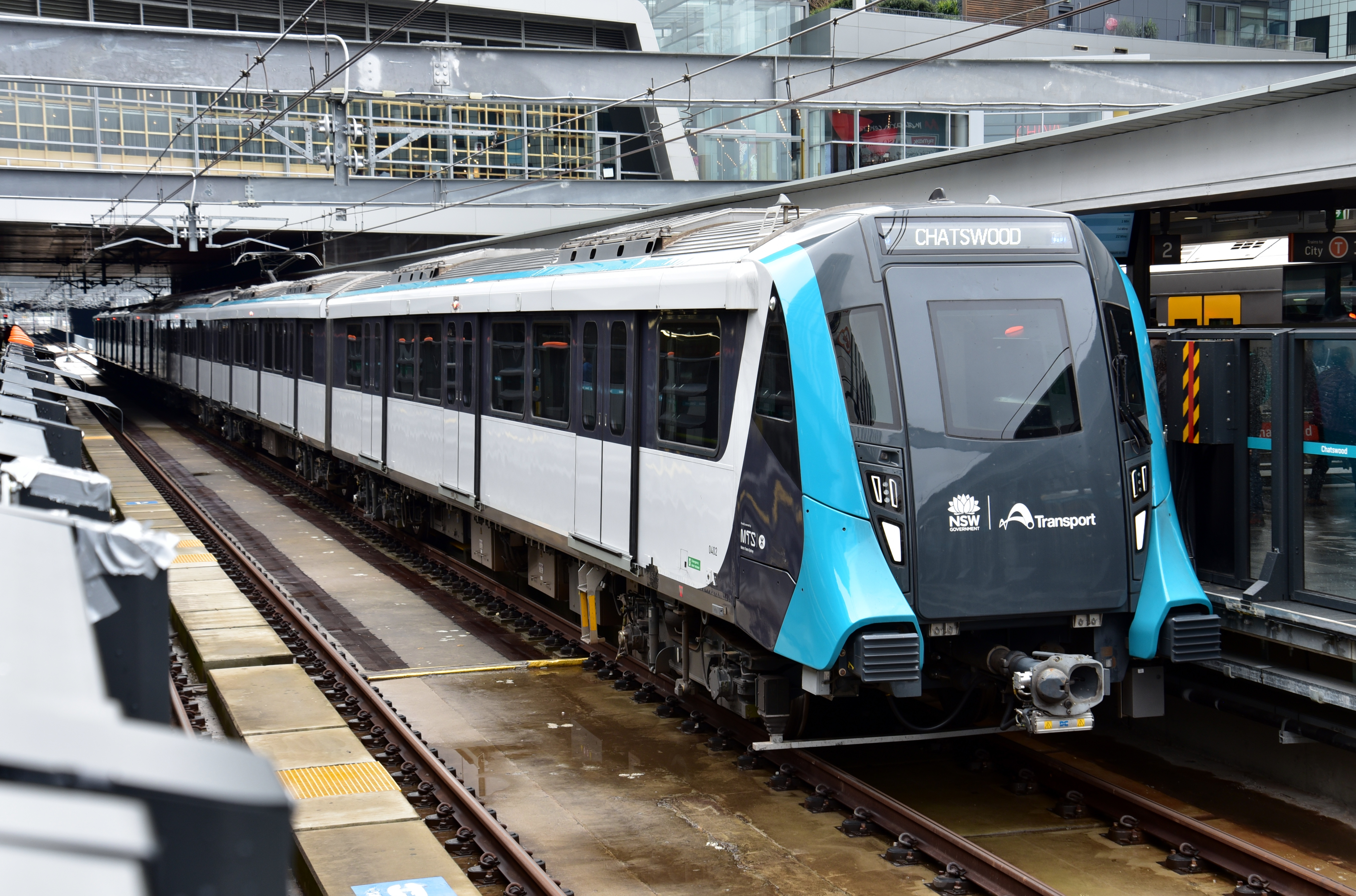
Metro West will run similar automated rolling-stock as other Sydney Metro lines.

The line will run for 24 km (15 mi) between Parramatta and the northern Sydney CBD, with at least nine stations in total. The line connects a number of suburbs in Sydney's inner west that lacked heavy rail transportation, including Pyrmont and Five Dock.

As of May 2021, there are nine confirmed underground stations along the alignment:

- Hunter Street (in the Sydney CBD)
- Pyrmont
- The Bays
- Five Dock
- Burwood North
- North Strathfield
- Sydney Olympic Park
- Parramatta
- Westmead

Hunter Street will be the only CBD station on the line, interchanging with other Sydney Metro and Sydney Trains services via pedestrian connections to Wynyard and Martin Place railway stations. The line will run via twin tunnels for its entire length. Like other Sydney Metro lines, Metro West will be fully automated using similar rolling stock to the Metro North West & Bankstown Line, with a stabling and maintenance facility to be built at Clyde. Major commercial and residential developments are planned around several stations, including a new town centre at Sydney Olympic Park.

Early construction began in 2020 and tunnelling commenced in 2023. Construction for Metro stations, their precincts and additional rail infrastructure is planned to commence from 2025. The line is planned to open in 2032, however the total cost of the project has not been released by the government, with 2021 reports in the Sydney Morning Herald suggesting a total price tag of $27 billion and a delayed opening date of 2033.

The project's western end serves a similar area to the Parramatta Light Rail, whose stage 1 alignment runs between Westmead and Carlingford. Stage 2 of the light rail project was initially deferred, then redesigned and truncated from Strathfield to Sydney Olympic Park via the suburbs to the north of the Parramatta River.

=== Possible extensions ===
The government have announced they will safeguard the ability to extend the eastern section of the line to the south-east via Zetland and Green Square, and also allow for extending the western section beyond Westmead to areas such as the new Western Sydney Aerotropolis.

== Construction ==
=== Procurement ===
Construction of the project is split into multiple parts, with separate contracts to build the tunnels, underground stations, rolling stock, signalling and electrical and mechanical systems.

==== Tunnelling ====
In August 2020, the government announced a shortlist of three consortia to deliver the project's first two major tunnelling packages. The consortia would first bid for the Central Tunnelling Package to build 11 kilometres (6.8 mi) of twin tunnels between The Bays and Sydney Olympic Park. The remaining two consortia who were not successful would then bid for the Western Tunnelling Package to build 9 kilometres (5.6 mi) of twin tunnels between Sydney Olympic Park and Westmead. The contract for the Central Tunnelling Package was awarded to the Acciona Australia and Ferrovial joint venture (AF JV) in July 2021 at a cost of $1.96 billion. The contract for the Western Tunnelling Package was awarded to Gamuda and Laing O’Rourke joint venture (GALC JV) in March 2022 at a cost of $2.16 billion.

The third tunnelling contract for tunnelling between The Bays and Hunter Street (Eastern Tunnelling Package) was put out to tender in mid-2021. The package included 3.5 kilometres (2.2 mi) of twin tunnels, two tunnel boring machines launched from a site in The Bays, a train turn-back cavern east of Hunter Street station, excavation and civil works on two stations, and tunnel lining segments. In November 2022, the Eastern Tunnelling Package was awarded to the John Holland, CPB Contractors and Ghella Pty Ltd joint venture (JCG JV) at a cost of $1.63 billion.

==== Stations ====
In December 2023, the government announced that two bidders were shortlisted to build the Station Package West contract, which includes the design and construction of five stations (Westmead, North Strathfield, Burwood North, Five Dock, and The Bays).

In January 2025, the Station Package West contract was awarded to Gamuda at a cost of $2.85 billion, with the contract for Hunter Street station and development above awarded to the Metropolis Consortium (Lendlease, Mirvac and Coombes Property Group) at a cost of $1.5 billion. The construction of remaining stations will be delivered individually as part of integrated station developments.

==== Trains, Systems, Maintenance and Operations ====
The Trains and Systems contract includes 16 metro trains, signalling and platform screen doors. In December 2023, the government announced that four bidders had been shortlisted:

- Alstom
- CRRC and MTR Corporation
- Hyundai Rotem and UGL Engineering
- Siemens Mobility

The Operations and Maintenance contract includes the operation and maintenance of the line over 15 years. In December 2023, the government announced that four bidders were shortlisted:

- GroWest Metro (a consortium of RATP and John Holland)
- Keolis Downer
- MTR Corporation
- River City Metro (a consortium of ComfortDelGro and UGL Rail)

In January 2026, it was announced that Metro Trains West Consortium (a joint venture of MTR Corporation and CRRC) had been awarded the combined Trains, Systems, Maintenance and Operations contract at a cost of $3.96 billion. The 22-year long contract includes the driverless automated trains, signalling systems as well as operations and maintenance for 15 years following the opening of the line.

The trains will not be compatible with other Sydney Metro lines, with the Western Sydney Airport line using Sydney Metro Inspiro Stock ordered from Siemens, and the North West & Bankstown Line using Sydney Metro Metropolis Stock from Alstom.

==== Linewide ====
In December 2023, it was announced that two bidders had been shortlisted for the Linewide Package. In January 2025, John Holland was awarded the $3.2 billion contract, which includes the design and construction of 11 kilometres (6.8 mi) of electrical and mechanical equipment including track, power, ventilation and communications systems, as well as building the depot for the line in Clyde.

=== Major construction and tunnelling ===
Early works to prepare for tunnelling commenced in 2020 with tunnelling on the central and western sections of the line expected to begin in 2023. Early works began in The Bays area in November 2020 to prepare for the arrival of tunnel boring machines in 2022. This was later pushed back to 2023. Media reports in 2021 suggested that difficulty in excavation and property acquisition in Sydney CBD for the Hunter Street station risked escalating costs on the project.

In January 2023 it was announced that the emergency exits in tunnels on the Metro West and Metro Western Sydney Airport lines will be spaced at 240 metres (260 yd) where possible, matching the existing lines.

== Reception ==
The metro line would run under several suburbs that will not be serviced by the line. These include Rozelle, Leichhardt, Silverwater, and Rosehill. However, on 13 April 2023 premier Chris Minns announced a review of the project with the government presently examining the potential to include additional stations along the route in these suburbs. In July 2023, Minns expressed concerns about budget overruns, thus signalling the project could be halted or delayed.

== Past proposals ==
In the 2000s, there were two previous proposals to link Sydney CBD to Western Sydney via a new alignment. The first of these was 'Western Fast Rail', proposed by a private consortium, linking Wynyard and Penrith stations. The second proposal was the West Metro announced in 2008 by then Premier Morris Iemma as a possible future route in a Metro Link proposal; a different and separate project to the current Sydney Metro first proposed by the new Liberal government in 2011.

=== Western FastRail ===
Concept art for the proposed Western FastRail based on the French TGV

Western FastRail was a proposed $2 billion privately funded underground and above-ground train line that would link central Sydney with Western Sydney independent from the CityRail network. Western FastRail was backed by a consortium led by businessman and former union leader Michael Easson, which included Dutch bank ABN AMRO and Australian construction company Leighton Holdings. The project was prompted by congestion on Sydney's westbound trains and roads, the growing importance of Parramatta as a business centre, higher petrol prices, public opposition to tolled roads and environmental concerns. An unreleased government document leaked to The Daily Telegraph suggests that such a train would eliminate the need of around 18 million car trips per year, reducing between 34,000 and 45,000 tonnes of greenhouse gas emissions being put into the atmosphere.

The proposal was first made on 11 April 2002 when Col Gellatly, the state's top civil servant and director-general of the Department of Premier convened a meeting of Treasury secretary, John Pierce, the Transport NSW director-general, Michael Deegan, and the State Rail Authority chief executive, Howard Lacy. Before them consortium leader Michael Easson made a presentation for a privately financed rail line linking Sydney's far west with the city. For a $8 return toll on top of the normal fare, trains travelling at 160 km/h could carry up to 16,000 commuters an hour to the city in 28 minutes, taking 11 minutes from Parramatta to the city. The proposal depended on the construction of two tracks from St Marys to Penrith, as well as taking over existing CityRail tracks between St Marys to Westmead. Costed at $2 billion, it was deemed extraordinarily cheap, and in December 2003 the Government formally rejected the unsolicited proposal.

In March 2005, the proposal was again brought up, and again in December 2006 by then federal Opposition Leader Kevin Rudd during a visit to Penrith should the Australian Labor Party win the 2007 Federal Election. The plan received approving comments by the NSW State Government. In September 2007 the proposal was again shown to the NSW Government. Under the proposal, the project is proposed to be funded by the private sector, with Fastrail's assets being returned to the NSW Government after 30 years.

On 18 March 2008, the NSW State Government announced SydneyLink, which included plans for the West Metro. Premier Morris Iemma was asked about the Western FastRail proposal, and said that "the proposal on Penrith has got to stack up," and "the work that has been done shows that it does not stack up, for a number of reasons." On 25 August, the State Government made a public announcement that it had ruled out the project two weeks earlier due to cost concerns, with the head of the consortium saying that the Government has failed to adequately review the proposal.

==== Proposed alignment ====
It was proposed that two 26 kilometres (16 mi) tunnels would link Sydney (possibly Wynyard station or a new nearby station to be built as part of MetroPitt) to Parramatta, with high-speed trains traversing across the distance in eleven minutes at speeds of up to 160 kilometres per hour (99 mph). The line would continue above-ground to Blacktown in six minutes, and onwards to Penrith in a further eleven minutes. At the time, journeys on existing CityRail lines took up to three times as long.

There were 10 stations proposed for the Western FastRail:

- Wynyard, Central, Sydney Olympic Park (possible new station), Parramatta, Seven Hills, Blacktown, Mount Druitt, St Marys, and Penrith.

=== West Metro ===
The centrepiece of the scheme premier Morris Iemma announced in March 2008 was "Metro Link" with an underground rapid-transit, privately operated, single-deck, automated trains. After Nathan Rees replaced Iemma later that year, the West Metro was incorporated into Rees's Sydney Metro project, announced in 2009. The West Metro would be the second stage 2 of the project, and would extend CBD Metro (stage 1 – Central to Rozelle) from Central westward to Olympic Park. Stage 5 of the project would further extend the line westward from Olympic Park to Parramatta, planned for completion in 2024.

Rees' Sydney Metro project was cancelled in February 2010 by the government led by newly appointed premier Kristina Keneally. Keneally said "We've listened to the community and made a tough decision," and pledging to reimburse tenderers and property owners for losses incurred as a result of the work that had occurred to that point. Keneally announced a $50 billion transport plan to replace the metro project, including a new heavy rail line under the CBD. Legislation to remove references to the Sydney Metro Authority was enacted later that year. Keneally's alternative was the CBD Relief Line, which would be heavy-rail bypass of the existing city-centre stations. Keneally lost office just over a year later in the 2011 New South Wales state election, and the relief line was cancelled by the incoming government led by premier Barry O'Farrell.
