= Sydney Olympic Park metro station =

Proposed railway station in Sydney, Australia

Sydney Olympic Park

General information
- Location: Sydney Olympic Park, New South Wales; Australia
- Coordinates: 33°50′57″S 151°04′10″E
- Owner: Transport Asset Manager of New South Wales
- Line: Sydney Metro West
- Platforms: 4
- Tracks: 2
- Connections: Olympic Park; Olympic Boulevard

Construction
- Structure type: Underground
- Accessible: Yes

Other information
- Status: Planned
- Website: www.sydneymetro.info

Services
Preceding station	Sydney Metro	Following station
Parramatta towards Westmead	Sydney Metro West	North Strathfield towards Hunter Street
Location

Sydney Olympic Park metro station is a planned underground Sydney Metro station that will be located on the Sydney Metro West line. It will serve the suburb of Sydney Olympic Park. It is to be built between Herb Elliot Avenue and Figtree Drive, to the south of the existing Olympic Park railway station. The main station entrance will be between Herb Elliot Avenue and Figtree Drive, with a second entry off Dawn Fraser Avenue. It is scheduled to open with the rest of the line in 2032.

== Design ==
The station itself will feature a Spanish solution platform design, with it having platforms on both sides of the trains allowing for boarding on one side and alighting on the other side. These will create increased capacity during large events, having a similar platform solution to the existing train station.
