= Estadio Olímpico =

Estadio Olímpico (Spanish) or Estádio Olímpico (Portuguese) ("Olympic Stadium") may refer to:

- Estadio Olímpico (Caracas), in Caracas, Venezuela
- Estadio Olímpico (Montevideo), in Montevideo, Uruguay
- Estadio Olímpico Atahualpa, in Quito, Ecuador
- Estadio Olímpico Benito Juárez, in Ciudad Juárez, Mexico
- Estadio Mario Alberto Kempes a.k.a. Estadio Olímpico Chateau Carreras, in Córdoba, Argentina
- Estádio Olímpico Colosso da Lagoa, in Erechim, Brazil
- Estadio Olímpico de Riobamba, in Riobamba, Ecuador
- Estadio Olímpico de San Marcos, in San Marcos, Nicaragua
- Estadio de La Cartuja a.k.a. Estadio Olímpico, in Seville, Spain
- Estadio Olímpico Hermanos Ghersi Páez, in Maracay, Venezuela
- Estádio Olímpico João Havelange, in Rio de Janeiro, Brazil
- Estadio Olímpico Félix Sánchez, formerly Estadio Olímpico Juan Pablo Duarte, in Santo Domingo, Dominican Republic
- Estadio José Antonio Anzoátegui, formerly Estadio Olímpico Luis Ramos, in Puerto la Cruz, Venezuela
- Estadio Olímpico (La Vega), in Concepción de la Vega, Dominican Republic
- Estadio Olímpico Metropolitano, in San Pedro Sula, Honduras
- Estádio Olímpico Monumental, in Porto Alegre, Brazil
- Estadio Manuel Rivera Sanchez a.k.a. Estadio Olímpico Municipal, in Chimbote, Peru
- Estadio Olímpico Pascual Guerrero, in Cali, Colombia
- Estadio Olímpico Patria, in Sucre, Bolivia
- Estádio Olímpico Regional Arnaldo Busatto, in Cascavel, Brazil
- Estadio Olímpico Universitario, in Mexico City
