= Westmead railway station =

Railway station in Sydney, New South Wales, Australia

Westmead
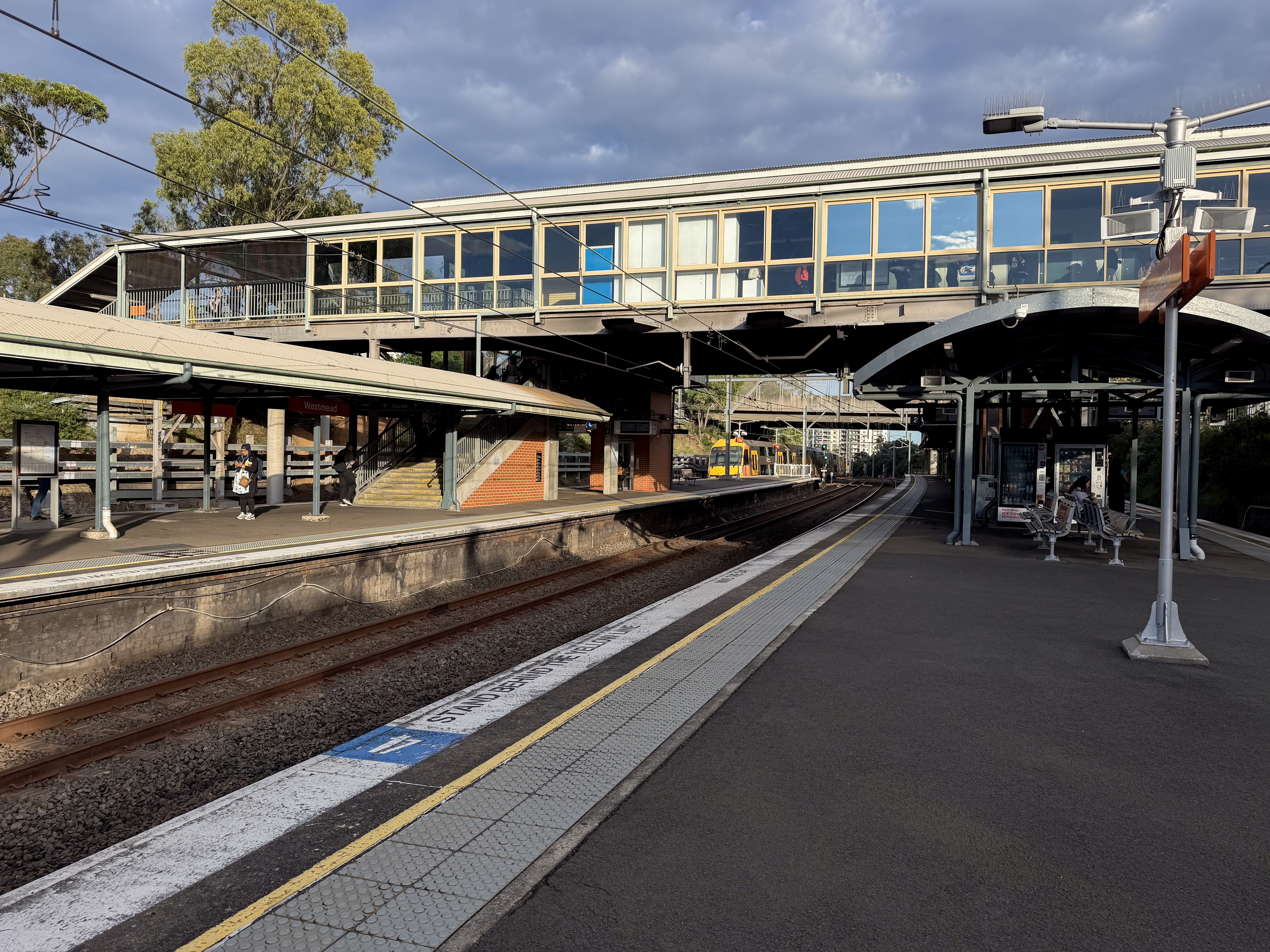
- Westbound view from Platform 2, April 2026

General information
- Location: Railway Parade, Westmead; Sydney, New South Wales; Australia
- Coordinates: 33°48′31″S 150°59′17″E
- Elevation: 37 metres (121 ft)
- Owner: Transport Asset Manager of NSW
- Operator: Sydney Trains
- Lines: Main Western; Rogans Hill
- Distance: 25.16 km (15.63 mi) from Central
- Platforms: 4 (2 island)
- Tracks: 4
- Connections: Westmead; Bus

Construction
- Structure type: Ground
- Accessible: Yes

Other information
- Status: Staffed
- Station code: WMD

History
- Opened: March 1883 (143 years ago)
- Electrified: Yes (from February 1955)

Passengers
- 2023: 3,346,940 (year); 9,170 (daily) (Sydney Trains, NSW TrainLink)

Services
Preceding station	Sydney Trains	Following station
Wentworthville towards Emu Plains or Richmond	North Shore & Western Line	Parramatta towards Berowra
Seven Hills towards Penrith or Emu Plains	North Shore & Western Line	Parramatta towards Berowra
Wentworthville towards Richmond	Cumberland Line	Parramatta towards Leppington
Preceding station	Intercity Trains	Following station
Penrith towards Bathurst	Blue Mountains Line (twice daily) Bathurst Bullet	Parramatta towards Central
Preceding station	Sydney Metro	Following station
Future service
Terminus	Sydney Metro West	Parramatta towards Hunter Street

Light rail connections
Preceding station	Parramatta Light Rail	Following station
Terminus	Westmead & Carlingford Line	Westmead Hospital towards Carlingford
Location

Westmead railway station is a suburban railway station located on the Main Western line, serving the Sydney suburb of Westmead. It is served by Sydney Trains T1 Western Line and T5 Cumberland Line services and intercity Blue Mountains Line services. Additionally, light rail L4 Westmead & Carlingford Line services terminate at Westmead, allowing for interchange with heavy rail services.

== History ==
Westmead station opened in March 1883. To the east of the station lies a dive through which one of the eastbound tracks passes. This was opened in 1986 as part of the quadruplication of the Main Western line between Westmead and Granville. It was necessary because west of Westmead the two westbound tracks run adjacent to one another as do the two eastbound tracks. East of Westmead, the westbound and eastbound tracks alternate.

Between 1922 and 1932, the Rogans Hill line branched from the Main Western line immediately to the west of Westmead station.

The station received an easy access upgrade prior to August 1997 which included tactile indicators, a lift to each platform and shelters along the island platforms.

The Parramatta Light Rail line, terminating at Westmead, opened on 20 December 2024.

== Services ==
=== Platforms ===
Platform	Line	Stopping pattern	Notes
1	North Shore & Western Line	services to North Sydney, Hornsby & Berowra via Central	
1	Cumberland Line	services to Liverpool & Leppington	
2	North Shore & Western Line	services to North Sydney, Lindfield, Hornsby & Berowra via Central & Chatswood	
2	Cumberland Line	services to Leppington	infrequently used
2	Blue Mountains Line	services to Central	2 morning Bathurst Bullet services (set down only)
3	North Shore & Western Line	services to Blacktown, Penrith, Richmond & Emu Plains	
3	Cumberland Line	services to Schofields	infrequently used
3	Blue Mountains Line	2 evening Bathurst Bullet services to Bathurst (pick up only)	
4	North Shore & Western Line	services to Blacktown, Penrith, Schofields, Richmond & Emu Plains	
4	Cumberland Line	services to Blacktown, Schofields and Richmond	

Sydney Metro West, scheduled to open in 2032, will terminate at Westmead.

=== Westmead light rail station ===
Westmead is the terminus of the L4 Westmead & Carlingford line. The light rail platforms are located at the intersection of Hawkesbury Road and Railway Parade.

The stop was originally proposed to have one island platform and two side platforms, with a total of three platforms, however it was built with only two platforms in an island platform configuration.

Line	Stopping pattern	Notes
Parramatta Light Rail	services to Carlingford	

=== Transport links ===
Bus Number	Route	Major Stops/Stations
705	Parramatta to Blacktown	T-Way, Pendle Hill Station, Toongabbie Station, Seven Hills Station
708	Parramatta to Blacktown	T-Way, Pendle Hill Station
711	Parramatta to Blacktown	Public/Children's Hospital at Westmead, T-way, Wentworthville Station, Seven Hills Station
660	Parramatta to Castle Hill	T-Way, Winston Hills Mall
661	Parramatta to Blacktown	T-Way
662	Parramatta to Castle Hill	T-Way, Norwest Business Park
663	Parramatta to Rouse Hill station	T-Way, Stanhope Gardens, Kellyville Ridge
664	Parramatta to Rouse Hill station	T-Way, Norwest Business Park
665	Parramatta to Rouse Hill station	T-Way, Bella Vista Station, Kellyville Station

Westmead station is served by two NightRide routes:

- N70: Penrith to Town Hall station
- N71: Richmond to Town Hall station

== Trackplan ==
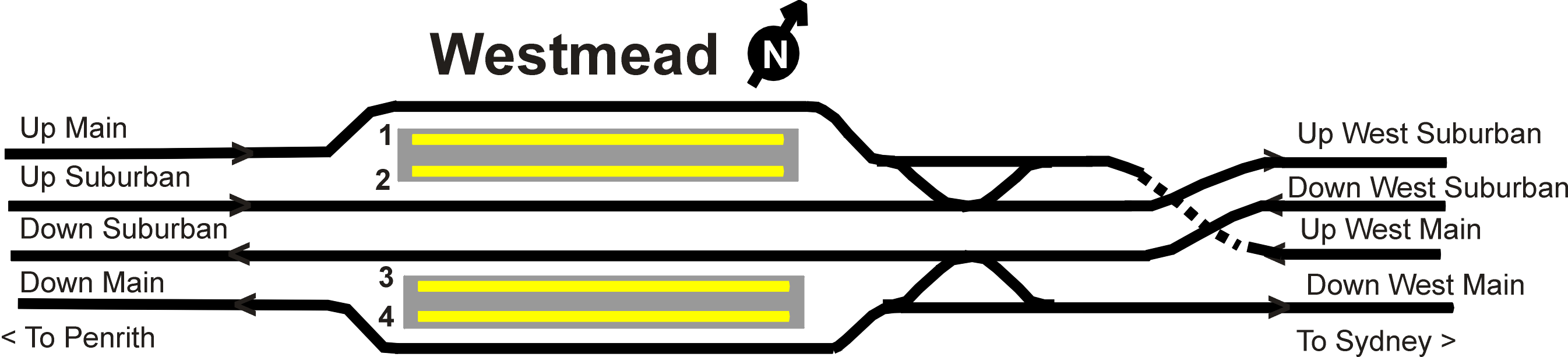
Track layout

== Gallery ==
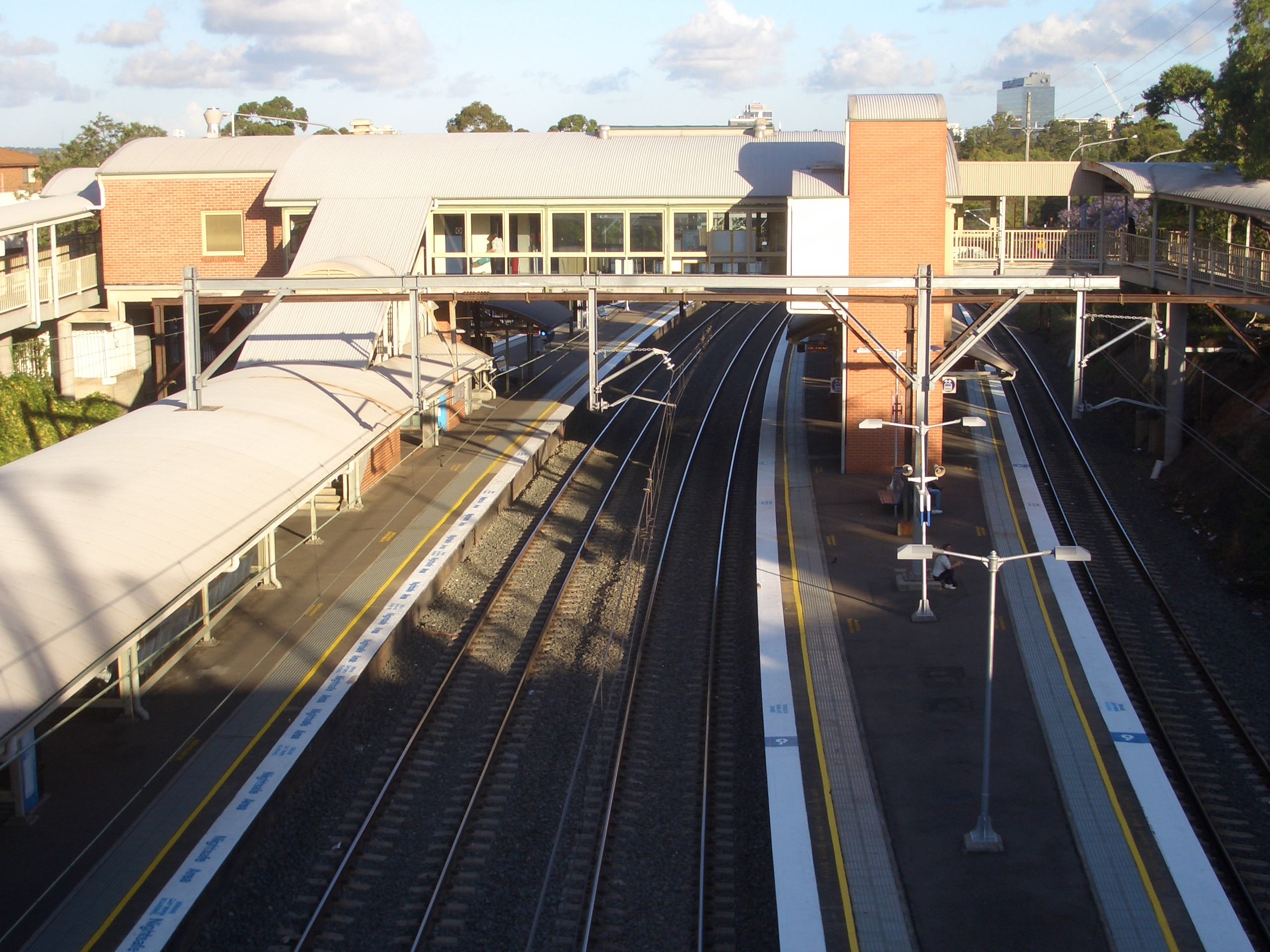
Eastbound view in November 2007

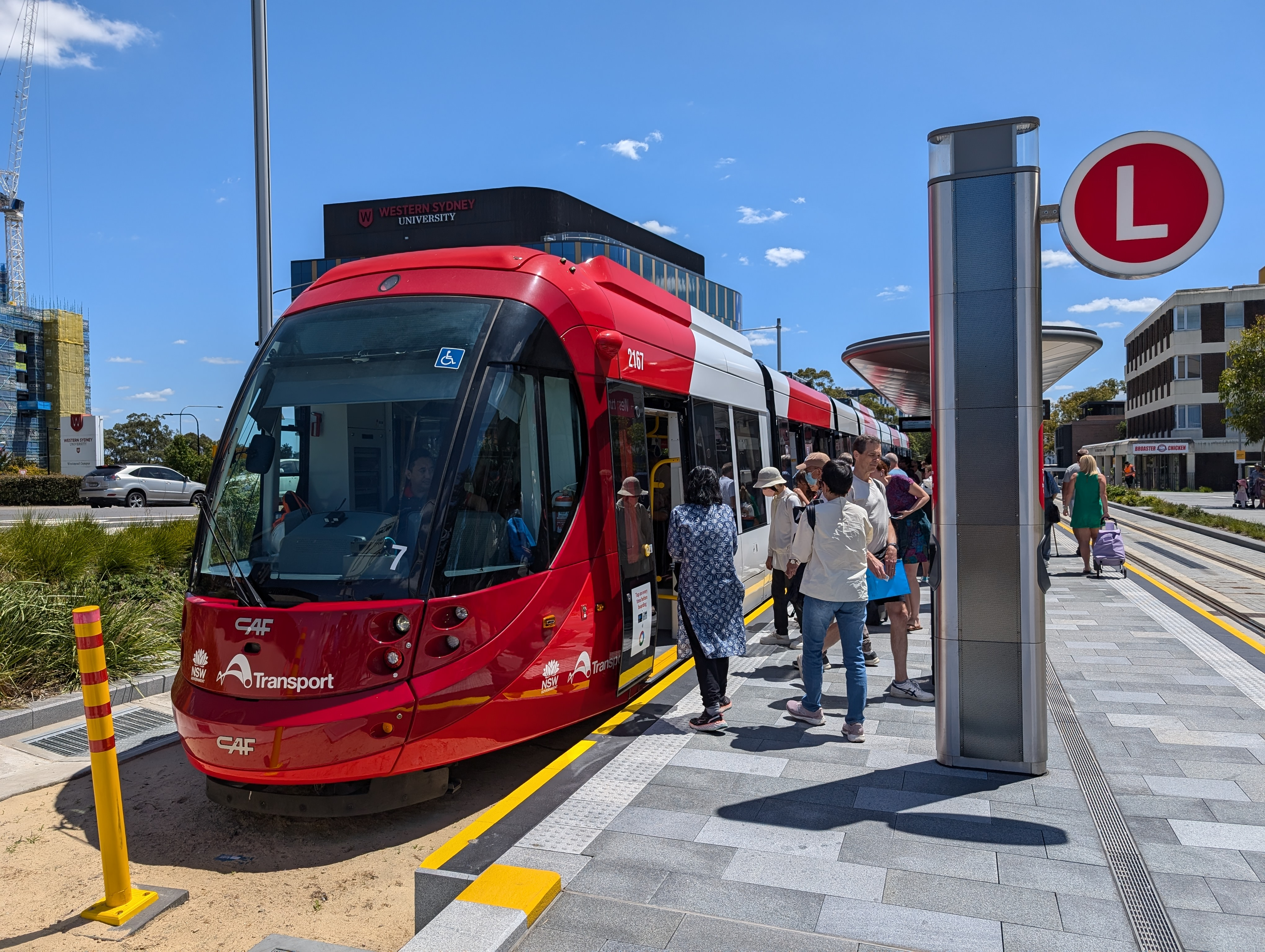
Light rail platform in December 2024
