= Hunter Street metro station =

Proposed railway station in Sydney, Australia

Hunter Street
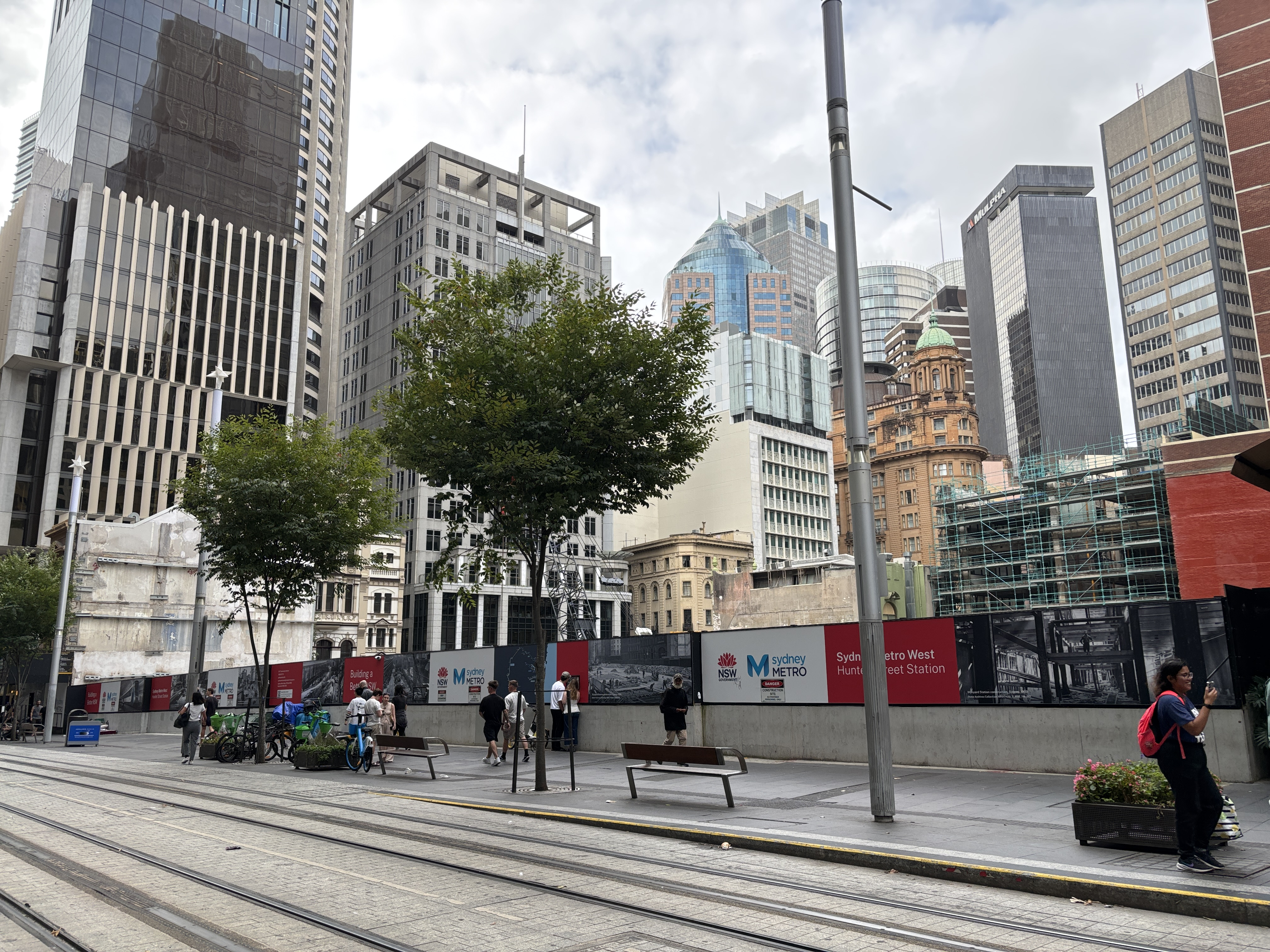
- The construction site for the Hunter Street railway station in April 2026

General information
- Location: Hunter Street, Sydney; Australia
- Coordinates: 33°51′56″S 151°12′35″E
- Owner: Transport Asset Manager of New South Wales
- Line: Sydney Metro West
- Platforms: 2
- Tracks: 2
- Connections: Wynyard; Bus; Wynyard

Construction
- Structure type: Underground
- Accessible: Yes

Other information
- Status: Under construction
- Website: www.sydneymetro.info

History
- Opening: 2032

Services
Preceding station	Sydney Metro	Following station
Pyrmont towards Westmead	Sydney Metro West	Terminus
Location

The entrance on the corner of Bligh Street, showing the station cavern and the mouth of the bored tunnel towards Pyrmont Station.

Hunter Street metro station is an underground Sydney Metro station currently under construction. It will be the eastern terminus of the Sydney Metro West line, serving the Sydney central business district. It will be built on the corner of Hunter and George Streets and Bligh and O'Connell Streets. Upon opening, it will provide connections to Sydney Trains services at the existing Wynyard and Martin Place stations, as well as to M1 Metro North West & Bankstown Line services at Martin Place station. Construction commenced in 2023.
