= Redstone, Telopea =

Redstone
- Location within New South Wales Location within Australia
- 33.7974°S 151.0401°E
- Location: 34 Adderton Road, Telopea, New South Wales, Australia

History
- Built: 1935

Site notes
- Architect: Walter Burley Griffin

New South Wales Heritage Register
- Official name: Redstone; The Winter House
- Type: state heritage (built)
- Designated: 9 January 2009
- Reference no.: 1795
- Type: House
- Category: Residential buildings (private)

Redstone is a heritage-listed private house at 34 Adderton Road, Telopea, New South Wales, Australia. It was designed by Walter Burley Griffin and built in 1935. It is also known as The Winter House. It was added to the New South Wales State Heritage Register on 9 January 2009.

== History ==
=== Aboriginal occupation of this part of Sydney ===
The valley of the Parramatta River had been populated by Indigenous Australians for some 40,000 years before European settlement by peoples of the Darug (or Dharug) nation. The Wallumedagal (or Walumettagal) clan lived along the north bank of the Parramatta River, westward from the Lane Cove River (centred on the present day Ryde district). Further west, at the head of the Parramatta River, lived the Burramattagal (or Booramedical) of the present day Parramatta district. Seasonal burning of the long grass to encourage a fresh grass supply for native animal feed created the fertile landscape that attracted the European colonists - large trees, spaced well apart with a grassy under storey.

=== Colonisation and European settlement ===
Governor Phillip's instructions from George III required him to begin cultivation immediately on landing at Sydney Cove. The failure of the first crops at Farm Cove turned Phillip's attention westward where he found the fertile country around The Crescent (present day Parramatta Park) and Prospect Hill that could sustain the agriculture needed to feed the infant colony. The Rose Hill (Parramatta) settlement was established late in 1788, and the 70 acres cleared for the Government Farm delivered the colony's first harvest of wheat, barley, maize, oats, vegetables and flax in late 1789. From 1791 all agricultural efforts were concentrated around Parramatta, spreading to The Ponds area (north of Victoria Road, Rydalmere, along The Ponds Creek into the Dundas Valley) in 1792 with the settlement of 14 First Fleet emancipists on 30 acre minimum land grants. Redstone is sited on part of each of two of The Ponds land grants, to William Hubbard and William Wade. Hubbard, a plasterer convicted of theft, and his emancipist wife Mary Atkinson (Goulding) successfully farmed the land and raised a family at The Ponds.

By 1834 the land on which Redstone is located was part of the Adderton Estate (with a driveway on to Kissing Point Road) where Major Robert Gerald Moffat, an officer of the Parramatta military detachment, lived with his family and convict servants until 1845. Adderton was surrounded by fruit orchards that had spread south from Carlingford and west from the Brush Farm Estate through the Dundas Valley to the Parramatta River. When the Dundas district was incorporated in 1889, its first aldermen were predominately local fruitgrowers. In 1883 Adderton was purchased as a dairy farm by orchardist Neil Harper who sent fresh milk to Parramatta twice daily. In 1885 Harper and other local residents petitioned the government to open an old track, now Adderton Road, connecting Pennant Hills Road to Kissing Point Road. Harper benefited considerably by the construction of Adderton Road and the Carlingford railway line. In the 1890s he subdivided his Adderton Estate into three to six acre blocks for orchards and small farms.

The Carlingford railway line was completed in 1896, passing near the western boundary of the Adderton Estate. Financed by the Bank of New Zealand it was the first stage of the planned extension of the private rail line from Clyde to Rosehill across the Parramatta River to the fruit growing district of Dural. The line was bought by the NSW Government in 1900, and never extended beyond Carlingford, but it did provide a rail connection to the city which influenced Edward Winter's decision to purchase land nearby for a family home in the country. Winter was reportedly influential in having Telopea railway station opened in 1925.

=== Redstone and the Winter family ===
Redstone is the last Griffin house still remaining in the ownership of the family who commissioned it. In 1924 Edward Winter purchased one hectare (2.5 acres) of former orcharding land (part of the Adderton Estate at Dundas) with the intention of building a family home where he, his wife Greta and their six children could enjoy a country lifestyle (until the mid 1950s, the Dundas-Telopea area featured much rural and orcharding land). From 1924 to 1935 the family occupied an existing house on the property, that was originally named Cliftonville but which they called "Redstone" after Edward Winter's grandfather's cottage in Wales. Cliftonville was a single-storey building with verandahs that were used as sleep-outs by its occupants, who included Edward Winter's father who came out from England and a sailor as well as the eight members of the Winter family. The household lived an easy, informal, semi-rural lifestyle at Cliftonville.

Edward Winter owned a gentleman's outfitter's shop in Pitt Street, Sydney while his wife, Greta, had worked as a photographic colourist before her marriage. They were friendly with Walter Burley Griffin through their shared involvement in the Single Tax Movement of the Henry George League and their other common interest, the Theosophical Society. Griffin encouraged Winter to build a new house for his family in the Dundas district and Winter commissioned Griffin to design the home. Construction began in March 1935 on a site approximately 1 acre in size (0.4 of a hectare). The remainder of Winter's land, including Cliftonville, was sold to offset the cost of construction of the new house. (Cliftonville has since been demolished). Upon its completion, in December 1935, Edward and Greta Winter and five of their six children moved into Redstone (the eldest daughter, Madge, having by then left home).

The new house was given the Winter family's traditional name of "Redstone". This is the name the family has always used for the property, although architectural historians tend to refer to it as "The Winter House".

The sandstone for Redstone was obtained from the grounds of a nearby property in Telopea owned by the Rumsey family (seed merchants and nursery owners) who were friends of the Winter family.

In September 1953, in order to fund his retirement, Edward Winter subdivided the remaining land into 8 allotments. He retained Lots 7 and 8, Redstone being located on lot 7. Suburban detached housing was constructed on Lots 1 to 6 and Winter Street was created to services these sites.

Edward Winter died in 1963 and the property passed to his widow, Greta. In 1974 Greta suffered a stroke, requiring her to move to a nursing home. The title to the house was transferred to the eldest of the Winter children, John Norman "Jack" Winter, although he never again occupied the house. In November 1976 his sister Nella Melchert (née Winter) and her husband Charles purchased the house and they resided there with their family. Following Charles' passing in 2002, Nellla lived alone at Redstone until her death in early 2008.

The Winter family have maintained the house with loving care over the many decades of their ownership, and Redstone remains almost unaltered in its structure and layout (although the colour scheme of its walls has changed at times). The original specification and original coloured contract drawings are still in the family's possession. The family is also remarkable for having employed high quality heritage advice in its maintenance and repair since the 1970s, ensuring that it has been conserved according to Burra Charter principles. In 2008 the family was preparing the house for sale.

Redstone was the last house designed and supervised by Walter Burley Griffin before he departed Australia in October 1935. Griffin's wife and professional partner, Marion Mahony Griffin, is understood to not have been involved in the design of Redstone. Similarly Griffin's practice partner, Eric Nicholls is understood to not have been closely involved in either the design or supervision of Redstone's, although he did sign-off on its construction in December 1935, after Griffin's departure.

=== Comparisons of intactness with other Griffin houses ===
Redstone is the most intact of the 19 surviving houses in NSW designed by Walter Burley Griffin, of which 13 are located in Castlecrag. Four of the five other Griffin houses outside Castlecrag are on Sydney's North Shore. Redstone is the only Griffin house built in Western Sydney.

Fishwick House is generally considered to be the most intact of the 13 houses in Castlecrag, both externally and internally, although Fishwick's windows have been replicated and 1970s-80s modifications included a rebuilt kitchen. In scale and form the Fishwick house differs considerably from Redstone. It is a large, two-storeyed house, the largest and grandest of the surviving Castlecrag houses, and is set in a naturally landscaped (rather than explicitly planted) garden. The Fishwick House and The Eric Pratten House re both large, grand two-storeyed houses. The Eric Pratten House was Griffin's largest Australian domestic commission. It was completed by his partner Eric Nicholls after Griffin departed Australia and there are differing professional views of the place of this building in the body of Griffin's work. Its intactness has been compromised by unapproved works in 2002 which gutted five bathrooms.

More closely comparable to Redstone are the Duncan House and Stella James House. The Duncan House is a small, ground-hugging building with similarities in design and use of sandstone bays to Redstone. But it was built as one of a group of three houses, is flat-roofed with no eaves and has been considerably extended in the 1940s and 1990s. More closely comparable in design, scale and use of materials is the Stella James House at Avalon. It differs from Redstone in that it is set in a steep natural bushland setting and not a planted garden. It is also less intact than Redstone. Originally a two-bedroom cottage, a terrace was added and in 1957 Sydney Ancher sympathetically added a third bedroom, on and over the terrace. The kitchen fittings were also modified.

Redstone is unprecedented in Griffin's work although its lines have an affinity with his horizontal Prairie houses. There is no other Griffin building with this roof form. There is an unbuilt project in Victoria that has some similarities in design approach and the Christian Jollie Smith house additions project at Castlecrag has similarities in its large stone end wall that includes the fireplace.

As at October 2008, four Walter Burley Griffin Houses are listed on the State Heritage Register: Fishwick House At Castlecrag, the Eric Pratten House at Pymble, the Walter Burley Griffin Lodge (a.k.a. the Stella James House) at Avalon and the Duncan House at Castlecrag.

== Description ==
A small sandstone and brick single-storey house, with a detached garage in similar style, set in a large open and intact inter-war era garden.

The double pitched overlay roof of "Super-6" corrugated asbestos cement has wide splayed, dark-stained timber bargeboards and deep overhanging eaves. External walls to sill height are of locally quarried (Telopea) sandstone. Above sill height, natural-coloured cement rendered walls form piers between very fine timber framed window and doors. There are heavy sandstone bookend walls to east and west elevations. A rustic sandstone chimney dominates the front view of the house.

The RAIA has described the style of the house as "Interwar exotic" and a "unique resolution of a compact, economic, suburban villa".

The original clients, Edward and Greta Winter, had three stipulations only regarding the house design: that the house not have a flat roof; that there be no steps and that every bedroom have a washbasin.

Greta Winter also wanted double the Council-required setback from the (then dirt) road. Walter Burley Griffin sited the house on the highest point of the original orchard, a position that in 1935 enabled views eastwards to the city and south to the Parramatta River. Typically for Griffin, the house is constructed directly upon the ground, separated only by a layer of tar, then gravel, then timber boards onto which the native cypress pine (Callitris sp.) floorboards are laid. According to acknowledged Griffin expert, Professor James Weirick of the University of NSW, one of Griffin's great enthusiasms was building directly onto the ground, for which he developed a technique with extensive use of bitumen.

In 1975 Peter Harrison produced a re-drawn plan of Redstone from Walter Burley Griffin's 1935 originals. Harrison renamed the Lounge as Living (room); the Scullery as the Utility (room) and the south-east facing Entry as the Porch. The rooms are referred to below by Griffin's names, with Harrison's following in brackets.

The front and back entrances open directly from the lounge room (living room) and back entry (porch) respectively onto patios shaded by large roof overhangs. It was Griffin's intention that the two entrances should have similar features and not be strongly differentiated. The south east facing entry (porch) was used by Edward Winter as a breakfast room and later by his widow Greta as her sitting room. The front entrance displays the original lettered sign, "Redstone".

Original features include: A) Throughout the house

- all floorings, being cypress pine timber except for mosaic tiles in the bathroom and painted cement render in the scullery (utility)..
- dark-stained timber skirting boards
- dark-stained timber doors
- recessed dark-stained timber casement windows
- unusual square, flush ceiling light fittings throughout the house
- dark-stained timber screens in the dining and lounge (living) rooms and corridor with brass rods

and additionally in the following areas:

B) Lounge (Living) room:

- the sunken fireplace (restored) with its ash pan opening to the outside for ease of cleaning. The lidded excavated exterior opening with its original iron shutter door, is set into the ground at the base of the sandstone chimney.
- a deeply recessed casement window with a planted window box in the western sandstone bay

C) Dining room

- three dark-stained and painted timber French doors that open onto the garden
- a fitted recessed dark-stained timber sideboard with mirror (which includes the original paint finish inside the cupboard)
- cabinetry with a two-way drawer to the kitchen

D) Kitchen

- a twin "German silver" sink, single swivel tap spout and piping (but not the tap handles)
- timber shelving against the window above the sink
- all cupboards and drawers (with a two-way drawer to the dining room) and work top (but not the resurfacing)

E) Scullery (Utility)

- a picture window in the scullery/kitchen wall

F) Entry (Porch)

- a cupboard that originally housed the ice-chest

G) Bathroom

- bath, taps, fittings, wall and floor tiles (but not the toilet, or stainless steel shower base)

H) Bedrooms

- basins, fittings, tile splash backs and mirrored toilet cabinets above basins in each bedroom
- built-in single wardrobes with doors in three bedrooms; two wardrobes and doors in the north-east corner bedroom

I) Corridor

- dark-stained timber shelving (which includes the original paint finish behind the shelves).

J) The garden is generally open in character and typifies larger gardens of the middle class of the inter-war era in its general layout, "clothed boundaries" and selection of plants favoured. Its main feature is a large sweep of lawn around the house to its north, west and south. A bank of shrubs near the house's north-west corner separates a smaller rectilinear lawn facing the bedrooms on the northern side of the house. The boundaries to the house's north, west and south fairly densely planted with shrubs and some trees. To the house's east the garage is flanked by beds and banks of shrubs and some fruit trees and other shrubs are planted on the additional lot to the east.

The garden contains several trees planted by Edward Winter and his wife, Greta. These include: a Canary Island date palm (Phoenix canariensis) and a date palm (P.dactylifera), which is a rare multi-trunked specimen (on the lawn north-west of the house); a cape chestnut, a Chinese elm, a jacaranda, a lemon-scented gum and a guava. One fruiting plum tree (Prunus x domestica cv.) from the orcharding period survives to the house's west.

Shrubs planted by the Winters and their daughter Nella Melchert include Camellia japonica cv.s, azaleas, a holly bush near the front door, a white bird-of-paradise flower (Strelitzia nicloae) north of the house and a rare orange-flowered South African wild pomegranate (Burchellia bubalina (syn.B.capensis). The camellia near the Manson Street driveway is a scion from the camellia (C.japonica cv.) at Cliftonville. Three Sydney blue gums (Eucalyptus saligna) planted by Nella Melchert in 1980 have grown out of control and are leaning dangerously over the house.

=== Condition ===
As at 17 October 2008, Redstone is the most intact surviving house designed by W.B. Griffin in NSW.

The place is in excellent physical condition.

Prior to the construction of Redstone, the subject land was used for orcharding. Therefore, the archaeological potential is considered to be low.

Redstone is an exceptionally intact item, both the building and its setting. It retains its original plan form, all of its original interiors ( including most of its finishes and fitments), its original exterior finishes and its mature garden in its near-original setting.

=== Modifications and dates ===
The following changes have been made to the place in the latter 20th century:

- 1953+: The garden setting has been reduced slightly at various times since 1953 by enlargements to the adjacent streets (Adderton Road and Manson Street).
- 1950s: Bathroom: a toilet was put into the bathroom (which previously consisted of only a shower and bath) when the Dundas area was connected to the metropolitan sewerage system. (The original, and extant, toilet was located in a room within the garage).
- Late 1950s/early 1960s: Lounge (Living) room: the sunken fireplace in the western wall was filled in with cement to accommodate a coke-burning Cozy stove. The Cozy was removed by 1972.
- Early 1960s
  - Scullery (Utility): the original green enamel Metters wood fuel stove (with four enamel legs, oven door on right and fuel door on left) that sat under the large window in the scullery/kitchen wall, was removed from the scullery. A modern cooker was installed in the kitchen, together with a refrigerator. (Previously ice was stored in an ice safe in the entry (porch) cupboard). Possibly at this time also the coke-fuelled industrial hot water system in the scullery cupboard (and its associated 90-gallon copper tank in the roof) were removed and replaced with an electric hot water system.
  - Kitchen: New surface to the worktop installed.
- 1970sL Scullery (Utility): ceramic tiling added to the scullery wall and a Stegbar door was fitted to the alcove on the south wall of the scullery that previously housed the American brand Savage electric washing machine purchased in 1935.
- 1987: Routine repairs were undertaken to the flashings, plaster, and pointing. All detail in the repair work matched existing.
- 2002: Large (and in Sydney relatively rare) Queensland kauri (Agathis robusta) cut down to the north-east of the house and garage. A seedling of the same tree is in the shrub border closest to the north-west corner (entry) of the house.
- 2008
  - Upper roof: Replacement of wide timber fascia board surrounding the upper level roof in dark-stained Oregon to match the original, mounted on new galvanised steel brackets maintaining the original supporting timbers.
  - Bedroom 1: washbasin refinished
  - Bathroom: A stainless steel tray (easily removable) laid in the shower base with no disturbance to the original tiled shower floor.
  - Lounge (Living) room: the concrete infill to the fireplace hearth was removed and the original timber trim refixed, to restore the fireplace to its original configuration.
  - Ceiling lights: lead sheets fitted behind ceiling light fittings to block off connections between the room interiors and the roof space.
- Date unknown:
  - The front "gate" entry in the site's north-western corner originally had a climbing rose cv "Crimson Glory" - this is gone today. There was a rose bed in the lawn south-west of the house. Mr Winter was "best-friends" with Roy Rumsey, a well-known nurseryman and gardener (commemorated in the Rumsey Rose Garden in Parramatta Park). It is possible the Winters obtained cuttings of roses and perhaps palm plants also from the Rumseys. A fruiting mango tree and a frangipani north of the house have both been removed.
  - A black bean stump (Castanospermum australe) on the north-east corner of the lawn north of the house is sprouting, showing a sawn-off trunk some 30 cm in diameter - this would have been a fair height tree (5-7m perhaps) before it was cut down.

== Heritage listing ==
Redstone is of state significance as an outstandingly intact example of the small-scale domestic work of the architect Walter Burley Griffin. An American student of Frank Lloyd Wright, Griffin is one of the most acclaimed designers to have practised in Australia. His extant works are rare internationally and important within Australia for introducing aspects of the Prairie School style of architecture.

The intactness of Redstone's interiors, including its fixtures and fittings, is extremely rare and of state significance. The garden, though not designed by Walter Burley Griffin, is a fine intact example of an interwar garden which contributes to the setting of the house.

Redstone was listed on the New South Wales State Heritage Register on 9 January 2009 having satisfied the following criteria.

The place is important in demonstrating the course, or pattern, of cultural or natural history in New South Wales.

Redstone has local heritage significance as the only example of the work of the internationally acclaimed architect Walter Burley Griffin to be found in Sydney's western suburbs. It is also of local significance as a pre-war residential home built on rural and orcharding land, a forerunner of the area's shift to residential sub-division. The Dundas-Telopea area remained a predominately agricultural and orcharding landscape until the introduction of a sewerage system in the 1950s enabled its transformation into suburbia.

The place has a strong or special association with a person, or group of persons, of importance of cultural or natural history of New South Wales's history.

The item has State significance for its historical association with the American architect, Walter Burley Griffin. Griffin, together with his wife Marion Mahony Griffin, is important to Australian cultural history for the innovative town planning design of Canberra and Castlecrag, and for the widely acclaimed architectural design of buildings such as Newman College and the Capitol Theatre in Melbourne.

Redstone is a representative example of Griffin's small-scale domestic architecture and is of exceptional intactness and integrity. It forms an important part of Walter Burley Griffin's body of work in Australia.

The place is important in demonstrating aesthetic characteristics and/or a high degree of creative or technical achievement in New South Wales.

Redstone is of State heritage significance for its aesthetic qualities as a fine work of architecture and an outstandingly intact example of Walter Burley Griffin's small-scale house design. It contains many of the features for which Griffin is highly regarded including open planning, juxtaposition of robust stonework with fine oiled timber joinery, Art Deco styled chimney, curtained interior screens, a ground hugging profile and a multi-layered roof with large overhangs (characteristic of the Prairie School style). The roof is constructed in "Super 6", an innovative building material for the 1930s (corrugated fibro cement sheet).The gracious garden retains trees and other species planted by the original clients and its design has been largely unaltered since 1953.

Redstone has State heritage significance for the extremely intact nature of its interiors, including the retention of its original fixtures and fittings. These include the dining room screen, and kitchen and bathroom fitments. A patch of the original stipple paint wall finish exists within a hall cupboard. The joinery of the house retains much of its original finishes.

Redstone is of State significance for the existence of its original construction drawings and documentation - moveable heritage which complements the building's exceptional intactness and integrity.

Still in its near-original setting, Redstone been owned and faithfully maintained to Burra Charter standards by the family of the commissioning client.

The place has strong or special association with a particular community or cultural group in New South Wales for social, cultural or spiritual reasons.

Redstone is of State significance for the esteem in which it is held by architecture enthusiasts and the professional architectural community as an excellent example of Walter Burley Griffin's small scale residential design and the most intact example of a Griffin house in NSW. Redstone is mentioned in most published works about Walter Burley Griffin and the house is often inspected and studied by architecture students. Professional and community esteem for the place is also evidenced by Redstone's inclusion on the following heritage listings: Parramatta LEP (1997), the Register of the National Estate, the RAIA (NSW Chapter) Register of 20th Century Buildings of Significance, the National Trust (NSW) Register and the Art Deco Society of NSW Interim Register.

The place has potential to yield information that will contribute to an understanding of the cultural or natural history of New South Wales.

Redstone is State significant as a highly intact example of the architecture of Walter Burley Griffin, and the most intact Griffin house in NSW which has been faithfully maintained to best practice standards over its entire existence.

The building is an important resource for understanding the design intent, detailing and construction techniques of the architect. This resource is enhanced by the existence of the architect's original construction documentation that is still in the owner's possession.

The place possesses uncommon, rare or endangered aspects of the cultural or natural history of New South Wales.

Redstone is State significant for its rarity as an exceptionally intact example of a Walter Burley Griffin designed house. Redstone is the most intact of the 19 surviving houses in NSW designed by Walter Burley Griffin. 13 of these are located in Castlecrag, and four are already listed on the State Heritage Register at 2008.

Redstone's rarity and significance is further enhanced by its intact garden setting and by the existence of architectural specifications and original drawings that are still in the owner's possession.

Redstone is also rare as the only Griffin designed house to have remained in the ownership of the one family since construction.

For a comparison of Redstone with other Griffin designed houses in NSW see History- Comparison with Griffin-designed houses.

The place is important in demonstrating the principal characteristics of a class of cultural or natural places/environments in New South Wales.

Redstone is State significant as a representative and highly intact example of the domestic architecture of Walter Burley Griffin and a local exemplar of the Prairie School architectural style. Redstone demonstrates characteristic features of this style, with which Griffin is associated, in its open planning, juxtaposition of robust stonework with fine oiled timber joinery, Art Deco style chimney, curtained interior screens and ground hugging profile. Redstone is representative of Griffin's residential designs in so far as they are characterised by open-planned forms, the use of sandstone and oiled timber and the sensitive placement of the house in the landscape.
