= Telopea =

Telopea can refer to:

- Telopea (plant), a genus of shrubs, common name waratahs
- Telopea (journal), a botanical journal named after the genus
- Telopea, New South Wales, a suburb of Sydney, Australia
- Telopea Park School
