= Loggan Rock =

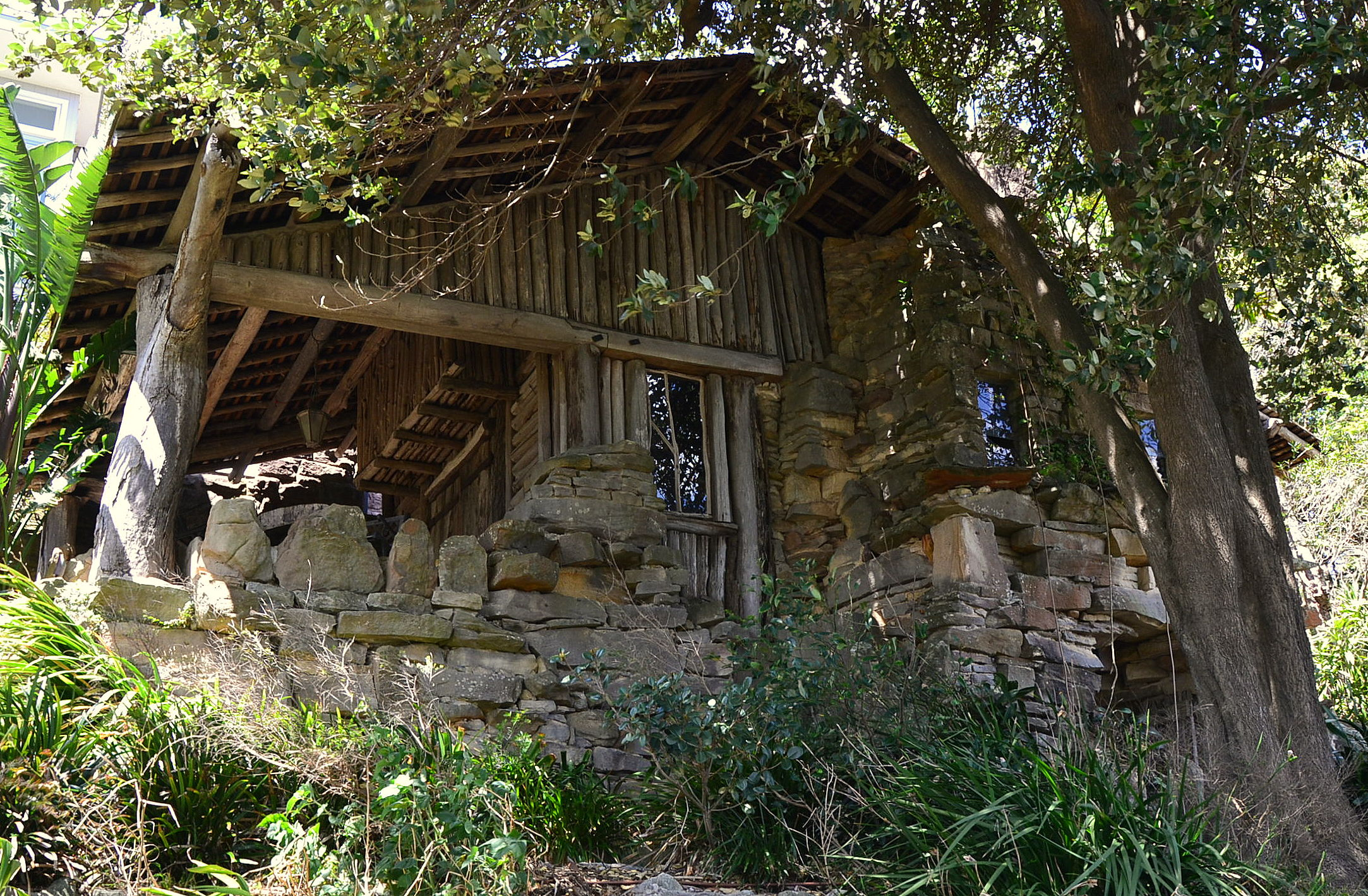
- Loggan Rock, pictured in 2012.

- Location within NE Sydney
- 33°37′08″S 151°20′18″E
- Location: 111 Whale Beach Road, Avalon Beach, Northern Beaches Council, New South Wales, Australia

History
- Built: 1929–1953

Site notes
- Architects: Alexander Stewart Jolly; with 1953 modern extension designed by Max Collard
- Architectural style: Californian Bungalow

New South Wales Heritage Register
- Official name: Loggan Rock; Cabin Avalon; Log and Rock
- Type: State heritage (complex / group)
- Designated: 15 August 2008
- Reference no.: 1779
- Type: Other – Residential Buildings (private)
- Category: Residential buildings (private)

Loggan Rock is a heritage-listed residential building located at 111 Whale Beach Road, Avalon Beach (formerly known as Avalon until 2012), Northern Beaches Council, New South Wales, Australia. It was designed in 1929 by Alexander Stewart Jolly in the Californian Bungalow style, with a 1953 modern extension designed by Max Collard. The house was built from 1929 to 1953. The house is also known as Cabin Avalon and Log and Rock; and it was added to the New South Wales State Heritage Register on 15 August 2008.

== History ==
=== Aboriginal land ===
The Sydney region has been populated by indigenous Australians for at least 40,000 years. At the time the British arrived, there were three different language groups in the Sydney region; these were further refined into dialects spoken by smaller clans. The principal language of Northern Sydney, where Avalon Beach is located, was Guringai. Much evidence of millennia of Aboriginal habitation remains, especially their rock etchings in Ku-ring-gai Chase National Park which borders Pittwater's western side.

=== Colonisation and settlement ===
The Pittwater Shire was named after an estuary of Broken Bay which the shire surrounds. Broken Bay forms the mouth of the Hawkesbury River, the main river which formed the Cumberland Plain and Sydney basin. Pittwater was discovered in 1788, the year the first British colony was established in Australia. Pittwater was named in about 1800 by the colony's first Governor, Governor Phillip, honouring the then British Prime Minister, William Pitt the Younger. Phillip called it "the finest piece of water I ever saw". . . Up until the early part of the 20th century, the area was primarily used for either agriculture or leisure activities. Its pristine beaches were popular for holidays and a number of camping areas, and later caravan parks, were established on or near Pittwater. After World War I, early urban settlement patterns were beginning to develop although most of the area's urbanisation occurred after the second world war with major home building activity occurring the full length of the Pittwater peninsula. The Pittwater shire is now the northernmost shire of Sydney's coastal metropolitan areas.

=== Loggan Rock land history ===
The land on which Loggan Rock now stands was part of the original 113.31-hectare (280.0-acre) grant of land to John Joseph Therry in 1837. In 1924 a 14.56-hectare (36.0-acre) parcel of land with road, including part of the Loggan Rock land, was subdivided and sold to Ernest Ebenezer Way who further subdivided the land and in 1928 sold Lot 179 and 180 DP to Harold Kent.

By 1932 the land on which Loggan Rock is sited was part of six residential lots, Lots 175 to 180 in 1932. Kent sold Lot 175 to Charles Berry Grieve in 1932 and Alexander Stewart Jolly commenced the design and construction of Careel House on that parcel of land. Careel House was completed in 1934 but during its construction, Jolly set about building the Loggan Rock holiday cabin on Lot 179 - 180 for his friend the film censor, Lionel Hurley. This land was subsequently sold to Alfred Dangar Burne and Hurley did not have legal possession of the land until 1937 when he finally had purchased and consolidated Lots 176 to 180 which then became Lot 4 DP 420717.

=== Design of Loggan Rock ===
The log cabin, Loggan Rock was completed in 1931 and in 1934 the stone tower was constructed. The tower contains a laundry bathroom on the lower level and two bedrooms on the first and second levels. The house remained in Hurley's ownership until 1950 when Loggan Rock was purchased by the artist and sculptor, John Bonar Dunlop and his wife Hilary, a talented dancer with the Bodenweiser Dance Company. In 1950s the Dunlops added a kitchen, dining and lounge room to the tower building. The tower was refurbished at the time. In December 1959 the land was transferred to Dr. Herbert Sheridan, an Avalon dentist. He in turn sold to Jan Smith and Greg Saunders who restored the property, then sold to the present owners Gerry and Regina Sutton in 2003.

== Alexander Stewart Jolly ==
Alexander Stewart Jolly was born in 1887 at Mearsham Valem near Lismore. He joined the family business where he learned the skills of timber milling, building and furniture making. In 1904 his brother travelled to America where he brought back news of the latest materials and developments in the building and timber industry. This was to prove a seminal influence in the development of Jolly's architectural style. In 1908 he found a job with the Sydney architecture firm Wardell & Denning and during this time completed Clunes Coronation Hall. Between 1912 and 1917 Jolly returned to Lismore and designed a number of well regarded buildings in the north coast region including St Mary's Roman Catholic Church, Casino, St Mary's Roman Catholic Convent and St Bartholomew's Anglican Church in Alstonville.

On his return to Sydney in 1918 he worked in his own practice in the city. Between 1918 and 1923 when he retired due to ill health he designed Belvedere, 7 Cranebrook Ave, Cremorne which is regarded as an exemplar of the Australian idiom of the Californian Bungalow style of American architects, Charles and Henry Green. This is one of only two Jolly residence listed on the New South Wales State Heritage Register, the other being Hy Brasil at Avalon (as the suburb was known until its name change to Avalon Beach in 2012). Two other residences, Nebraska, built in 1919 and Noonee, built in 1923 demonstrate the further development of Jolly's interest in the Federation Arts and Crafts architecture. Although influenced by the American idiom his designs in this period were "never a parroting of current popular trends. while his ideas may have been launched from ideas assimilated from abroard, they were quickly changed, added to and interpreted to make them distinctively his own and wholly the work of a highly creative mind".

His unusual use of timber and stone rubble external features and his idiosyncratic inglenook design in these early houses mark the beginnings of the more dramatic expression of his organic architecture of the later 1920s and early 1930s in structures such as Loggan Rock. The catalyst for Jolly's commitment to an imaginative and organic style of architecture which grows out of and in harmony with nature may have been his illness and retirement from office based architecture in 1923. After his retirement he eschewed the "rushing hell" of the city in favour of the calm of the bush. In fact, a passage from Jolly's children's book, "The Spirit of the Bush", could describe Jolly's state of mind and intentions at the time of his retirement.

"A man was once very tired and weary of the city. His business had failed and he was reduced to his last few pounds. This worried him, so he decided to give all the money he had to his wife and asked her to make it last as long as possible."

"I will go into the bush and seek for gold as there is no work to be had in the city... He thought as he as he walked along of the many disappointments in his life and felt that at last he was doing the right thing in going away."

— Alexander Stewart Jolly

Jolly went to Avalon in the late 1920s and teamed up with A. E. Dalwood real estate developer offering his services to design homes for those who bought the newly subdivided land on the peninsular. During commissions he camped at Avalon and developed highly detailed drawings of the houses before they were built. The detailed placement of stone and timber in these structures and especially in the detailed inglenooks the houses incorporated was so important to Jolly that he often resorted to constructing these details himself, selecting particular stones and branches and placing them into the construction exactly where they should be. The initial studies and their final built expression are a testament to Jolly's ingenuity and creativity.

During this period Jolly designed and built:

- Loggan Rock (1931, 1934), an imaginative expression of organic architecture in a log and rock cabin
- the more sedate Careel House, reminiscent of a Scottish castle (1934)
- Stonehaven, a unique stone rubble cabin (1933), and
- Hy Brasil, another bush cabin in a harmonious construction of stone and timber (1933).

It has been noted that these houses marked a renewal of and radical departure in Jolly's architecture which included number of 'stone and timber houses incorporating natural rocks, tree trunks, logs with bark still clinging and forked branches. These were built into strangely organic and often whimsical forms, resembling boulders or animals... rather than the angles and planes of conventional architecture".

== Significant persons associated with Loggan Rock ==
Lionel Hurley, the first owner of Loggan Rock was one of the early film censors who established the regulation of the then infant Australian Film Industry. During the period of Lionel Hurley's ownership of the Loggan Rock cabin there were a number of high-profile figures who retreated there including film maker Frank Hurley. Hurley importance as a film maker and photographer is derived from his photographic documentation of the Mawson and Shackleton and Antarctic Expedition and as official photographer in the Middle East during both World Wars as well as a maker of many well known documentary and feature films during the 1930s.

Like Loggan Rock's owner Lionel Hurley, Frank gained a reputation as the generous host of many uproarious parties attended by well known figures in the theatre, film making and artistic circles. Guests of these two men included "Mr RKO", Ralph Doyle the film distributor and his wife, Patricia Minchin whose fame as a photographic model was sealed with the launch of the ubiquitous advertising campaign featuring Patricia as the face of the Atlantic Ethyl oil company. Ken Hall, writer and director of the ubiquitous Dad and Dave series of movies and important pioneer in the Australian film industry was also a regular guest at Loggan Rock.

Prior to World War II other well known Sydneysiders took advantage of the cabin and its facilities. It was a regular weekend retreat for Margaret Jay, a successful interior designer, and Elisabeth MacIntyre, the prolific children's writer and artist. The stream of well known visitors of an artistic bent continued in the 1950s when Loggan Rock was owned by artist Bonar Dunlop and his wife who entertained renowned contemporaries such as the Archibald prize winning and noted World War II artist Arthur Murch. These owners built the 1950s extension based on a design by Max Collard, although the extension was changed in its execution.

== Description ==
Loggan Rock is located on a rocky outcrop on Careel Head. The site contains a number of important elements including: a log cabin on a base of random stone blocks; an adjoining 1934 residence formed by a random rubble stone tower with 1950s extension; and unique garden; they are organised into a series of intimate spaces, courtyards, terraces, viewing platforms, walls, steps and pathways carefully integrated into the rock outcrops and mature trees of the natural bushland setting. Paths and steps twist up the steep hill slope. There are numerous stone benches, placed to capture views and spots of sunlight, to encourage thinking and communing with nature. Other sculptured elements of high creative accomplishment providing rich sensory experiences that form part of the total landscape setting include: a sandstone seating niche below the massive sandstone chimney of the cabin; the pier forming veranda post, a sandstone flagged terrace with four sandstone piers (minus pergola) with a sandstone table surrounded by seating height sandstone rubble wall; external fireplace (between the cabin and the residence); corbelled stone planting box; internal stair cut into bedrock, three internal fireplaces in the residence. Mature trees, native bushland including rock orchids (Dendrobium speciosum) have been retained. The garden is a distinct departure from the formal axially arranged gardens prevalent during the 1920s and 1930s.

Loggan Rock is constructed in two main sections, a log cabin separated entirely from a tower building with a 1954 extension (the designer of the 1954 section is unknown at present). The building grows upwards on its steep site from a base of random stone blocks. These support a massive stone chimney, structural posts made from hefty bush trunks and a gabled roof, reminiscent of the forms Jolly used in his bungalow houses The roof of the cabin is shingled, its veranda propped at one end on a shapely tree trunk and branch. 'Walls are infilled with round logs, bark still intact - horizontally laid as in old Australian slab cottages, vertically fixed like the walls of slab or miner's huts or New Guinea long houses or wildly angled with their own geometrical inspiration.' Tree branches form the windows with the glass panes set into forks between the branches.

The interior plan of the cabin is roughly cruciform in shape, on the west side is an inglenook and the fireplace is surmounted by a massive stone chimney, this is reflected on the eastern side by a bay lined with seats leading out through doors which open onto the sunny paved space behind the cabin. On the south a run of windows provide views out towards Avalon, at the other a gallery is accessed by a stepladder with rope baluster. Beneath the gallery a pair of massive boarded, planked and studded doors provide access to a sandstone flagged veranda with views down the valley.

"The interior is designed to encourage its occupants to sit and chat. Built-in rustic furniture is virtually all that is required to furnish the room. Stone benches are slotted into the walls, gathered around the fireplace inglenook or facing into the room. A giant banksia trunk is sliced across to form a table, its polished surface branching out into the shape of boughs. Shelving is built into the walls. The fireplace nook not only invites a cosy confluence of guests to warm hands and smoke pipes, the windows to either side of the chimney flue provide views and lighten the interior, encouraging gathering at any season. To either side of the inglenook, stone bastions convey the solidarity of the typical heath - their heavy pillar-like forms outlined in chunks of stone which are interspersed with an intricate jigsaw pattern of multicoloured sandstone rocks"

The "Loggan Rock" tower building and 1954 extension are superbly sited with windows contrived to overlook Whale Beach and the Pacific Ocean, Avalon, Careel Bay and Pittwater. The angled 1950s living room provides views in all directions. These additions have been attributed to the time that Hillary and John Bonar Dunlop owned the property. The additions are single storey and include a bathroom, kitchen, kitchen inglenook, dining room and living room incorporating the 1934 tower. The additions are constructed of vertical timber weatherboard cladding on a timber frame onto of a rubble sandstone base that retains the rock outcrop, the living room cantilevering out over the rock formation.

The tower and its additions feature a flat roof. Wide ventilated timber eaves along the north, east and west elevations of the 1954 addition protect the large plate glass windows and doors opening onto the upper terrace and extending the internal space. The additions are a rare example of a blend of post war international and regional style residential architecture.

The strongly vertical tower contrasts with the log cabin. It is a severe stone block structure (with small projecting sandstone lintel hoods over the windows) cut into the bedrock from which it emerges and from which the sandstone blocks were quarried. The cabin dates from 1929 and the adjoining tower from 1934.

Individual components assessed as having Exceptional Significance are the Log Cabin, the Tower, the garden setting and the Banksia Table.

=== Condition ===
As at 26 April 2006, the buildings and garden were in good physical condition having recently been restored by the previous owners Jan Smith and Greg Saunders. The shingle roof has been renewed. The garden has been cleared of weeds and is well maintained, all walls, paths steps and terraces and sandstone features are now visible and in good condition. Investigation of its indigenous archaeological potential has not formed part of the research.

The place is substantially intact, with minor alterations to the buildings and garden having been restored in 2002–2003.

=== Modifications and dates ===
- 1929 Log cabin construction began
- 1931 Completion of Log Cabin
- 1934 Completion of the Tower
- 1954 Completion of modernist extension to the Tower.

=== Further information ===
"Loggan Rock" is adjacent to and north of "Careel House", 105a Whale Beach Road, Whale Beach also designed by Alexander Stewart Jolly for Major & Mrs C. R. Grieve. They believed to be the earliest dwellings on Careel Headland.

== Heritage listing ==
As at 23 March 2007, Loggan Rock was of State significance as one of three "organic" houses designed and built by Alexander Stewart Jolly at Avalon that retain the integrity of their unique landscape settings (the others are "Careel House" and 'Hy-Brasil'). Each is a separate and enigmatic creation of an architect who left a distinctive body of work. "Loggan Rock" is ingeniously crafted from stone and timber incorporating natural rocks, boulders, roughly squared quarried sandstone, timber shingles, rough barked logs, tree trunks, and forked branches. The Loggan Rock log cabin, tower, their immediate surroundings, and the wider landscape context display significance at a State level for a high degree of creative accomplishment as a rare and outstanding examples of "organic" architecture in harmony with nature. The Loggan Rock complex in conjunction with the other two remaining Jolley houses, Careel House and Hy Brasil demonstrates a distinctive set of aesthetic values, lifestyle values and design styles. Built in the late 1920s and early 1930s these houses are a distinctive expression of the concerns and formative architectural influences evolving through Jolley's career.

Loggan Rock along with the other two Jolly residences were also the gathering places of many others associated with the vibrant arts community of Avalon that emerged after World War I and flourished for the next four decades. The building complex and its garden has been designated as having high historic significance at State Level as the former home of Lionel Hurley, of the Commonwealth film censor's office, and Bonar & Hillary Dunlop important artists of the mid 20th century in Australia who achieved substantial public recognition in the fields of photography and film sculpture and abstract art.

Its historic significance is enhanced through its association with a number of people of seminal importance to the development of the film industry and artistic community in NSW and Australia. These include: Frank Hurley, the noted film maker and artist who used Loggan Rock as a workplace and retreat; Ken G. Hall & the Cinesound crew, Patricia Minchin, film distributor Ralph Doyle "Mr RKO" Elisabeth MacIntyre, noted children's book writer and illustrator. These people were important pioneers in the development of the film industry in NSW and Australia.

The place has local significance as it has the potential to yield further information on the subdivisions, local land speculation and building ventures of A. S. Jolly and A. E. Dalwood. The item provides an important link to the development and evolution of settlement on the Careel Headland as well as the wider Avalon area.

The place demonstrates the work of architect Alexander Stewart Jolly and post World War I "contemporary" design. Loggan Rock was designed and built in the period of Jolley's career when, he retired from office based architecture in Sydney due to illness. The almost whimsical aesthetic of Loggan Rock cabin and tower, which is carefully crafted from materials inspired by the natural environment, give full expression of Jolley's ideal to leave the "rushing hell" of the city and re connect with the values and peace of a quiet life in nature. The group of buildings and associated fixtures and built in furnishings provide valuable resource for research into architectural and design techniques and styles.

Loggan Rock was listed on the New South Wales State Heritage Register on 15 August 2008 having satisfied the following criteria.

The place is important in demonstrating the course, or pattern, of cultural or natural history in New South Wales.

Loggan Rock Cabin, the Tower and the garden setting is of State heritage significance as one of three remaining examples of the work of Alexander Stewart Jolly on the Avalon Peninsular. They represent a significant stage in the evolution of Jolly's work from his early work influenced by the Californian Bungalow style of Greene and Greene to the creative and unique organic expression displayed in the Loggan rock built structures. Loggan Rock and the other organic houses Jolly designed on the Avalon peninsular mark a unique and important development in the organic architectural movement in Australia.

The place has a strong or special association with a person, or group of persons, of importance of cultural or natural history of New South Wales's history.

Loggan Rock is of State significance as it is associated with a number of prominent figures in the history and development of architecture and the arts.

Alexander Stewart Jolly was a prominent architect who is noted as being one of the finest exponents of the Californian Bungalow architectural style in Australia. Loggan Rock is one of a number of houses all built in the Avalon area which demonstrates the evolution of his architecture through to its later expression as organic architecture. Lionel Hurley, a pioneering member of the Film Censorship Office was the first owner/inhabitant of the cabin and host to a number of famous visitors such as Hurley, Patricia Minchin actress and model, Ralph Doyle "Mr RKO", Ken G Hall manager of Cinesound Productions and director of the Dad and Dave films, Elisabeth MacIntyre, children's writer and illustrator and the interior designer, Margaret Jay. In the 1950s Loggan Rock was home to the artists Hillary and Bonar Dunlop who achieved substantial recognition in the fields of photography, sculpture and abstract art.

The place is important in demonstrating aesthetic characteristics and/or a high degree of creative or technical achievement in New South Wales.

Loggan Rock is of State heritage significance as one of three "organic" houses designed and built by Alexander Stewart Jolly at Avalon that retain the integrity of their unique landscape settings (the others are "Careel House" and 'Hy-Brasil'). Each is a separate and enigmatic creation of an architect who left a distinctive body of work. "Loggan Rock" is ingeniously crafted from stone and timber incorporating natural rocks, boulders, roughly squared quarried sandstone, timber shingles, rough barked logs, tree trunks, and forked branches.

The Loggan Rock log cabin, tower, their immediate surroundings, and the wider landscape context display significance at a State level for their high degree of creative accomplishment. The buildings in their garden setting are considered to be of State significance as rare and outstanding examples of "organic" architecture in harmony with nature. The Loggan Rock complex in conjunction with the other two remaining Jolley houses, Careel House and Hy Brasil demonstrates a distinctive set of aesthetic values, lifestyle values and design styles. Built in the late 1920s and early 1930s these houses are a distinctive expression of the concerns and formative architectiural influences evolving through Jolley's career.

The cabin, tower & 1950s additions are designed to seemingly organically rise from the surrounding landscape and gardens making the group of buildings aesthetically distinctive and a fine example of organic architecture in the Australian context.

The place has a strong or special association with a particular community or cultural group in New South Wales for social, cultural or spiritual reasons.

The place has both a strong and special association with the early holiday makers and weekend visitors to the Avalon area who came to appreciate the natural bushland setting. The property was also the gathering place of many others associated with the vibrant arts community of Avalon that emerged after World War I and flourished for the next four decades.

The place has potential to yield information that will contribute to an understanding of the cultural or natural history of New South Wales.

The place has the potential to yield further information on the subdivisions, local land speculation and building ventures of A. S. Jolly and A. E. Dalwood. The item provides an important link to the development and evolution of settlement on the Careel Headland as well as the wider Avalon area.

The place has heritage significance at a State level as it demonstrates the work of architect Alexander Jolly an important architect of the early 20th century whose architecture demonstrates the expression and development of the arts and crafts and organic architectural styles in the Australian context. The group of buildings and associated fixtures and built in furnishings provide valuable resource for research into architectural design and techniques in the early 20th century.

The landscape design has the potential to yield valuable research information on the emergence in popularity and understanding of Australian native gardens.

The place possesses uncommon, rare or endangered aspects of the cultural or natural history of New South Wales.

The place is of State significance as it is a rare example of Jolly's organic architecture. While Hy Brasil and Careel House also express his experimentation with organic forms, each of the three remaining examples at Avalon are distinctively different in their architectural expression although they are linked by their use of materials, wrought from their surrounds and harmonising with the landscape. Thus Loggan Rock can be considered a rare element in a rare set of Jolly's buildings built in the later part of his career expressing his interest in the organic idiom.

The furniture and garden of Logan Rock is a rare record of the uniqueness of a culture in place and time which focused on a heightened appreciation of organic forms and natural materials.

The place is important in demonstrating the principal characteristics of a class of cultural or natural places/environments in New South Wales.

Loggan Rock and its setting is thought to be of State heritage significance as a fine example of its Jolly's organic architecture. Loggan Rock and its garden setting are considered to be quintessentially representative of Alexander Stewart Jolly's architecture and philosophy regarding the built form and its relationship to the natural Australian landscape.

== See also ==
- Australian residential architectural styles
