= Mandy Zieren =

Australian bodybuilder (born 1978)

Mandy Zieren (born 1978-10-09) is an Australian bodyboarder competing on the International Bodyboarding Association World Tour.

Zieren, a resident of Avalon, New South Wales has won five Australian bodyboard titles and has been ranked as high as third in the world bodyboard rankings.
