= Hy Brasil, Avalon Beach =

Heritage-listed house in Australia

Hy Brasil
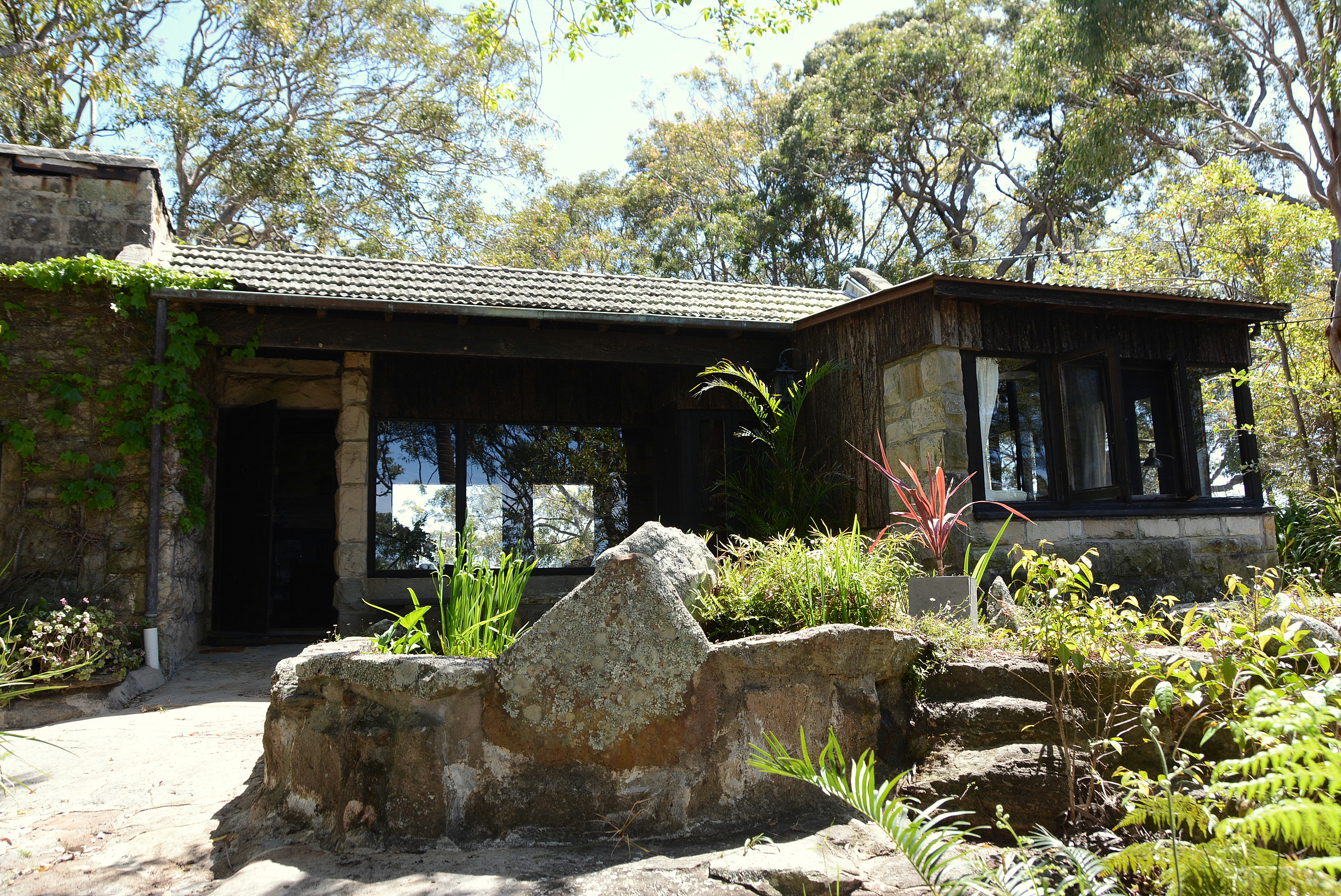
- Hy Brasil, Avalon Beach, in 2016

- Location within NE Sydney
- 33°38′03″S 151°18′59″E
- Location: 62 Chisholm Road, Avalon Beach, Northern Beaches Council, New South Wales, Australia

History
- Built: 1936

Site notes
- Architect: Alexander Stewart Jolly
- Architectural styles: Californian Bungalow and Organic

New South Wales Heritage Register
- Official name: Hy Brasil; The Gem; Hi Brasil
- Type: State heritage (built)
- Designated: 2 April 1999
- Reference no.: 79
- Type: House
- Category: Residential buildings (private)

Hy Brasil, also sometimes Hy-Brasil, is a heritage-listed house located at 62 Chisholm Road, Avalon Beach, New South Wales, a suburb of Sydney, Australia. It was designed by Alexander Stewart Jolly and built in 1936. It is also known as The Gem and Hi Brasil. It was added to the New South Wales State Heritage Register on 2 April 1999.

== History ==
The land on which Hy Brasil is located was originally part of 490 hectares (1,200 acres) of land granted to John Joseph Therry on 31 August 1833. It was subdivided as part of the Pittwater Estate, a subdivision for villa sites. The first owners of the land (Lot 8A of the Pittwater estate subdivision - main part of the site where Hy Brasil stands now) were Joseph Dalton and Daniel Claney who transferred the land to George Holland in December 1882. Holland held the possession of the land until July 1927 when he sold it to Redway Thomas Pawley and Arthur George Potter. The ownership of the land passed on to Albert Travers Black after just two months and a year later Kathleen Wilhelmina Jolly, wife of Alexander Stewart Jolly, purchased it from Albert Travers Black in 1923. She became the registered proprietor of the land on 4 March 1931.

Mrs Jolly transferred the land, which was still undeveloped together with its surrounding neighbouring allotments, to the Australian Land Development & Investment Company limited on 15 April 1931. Eventually the land was purchased by Arthur Wilson on 24 June 1935 and shortly after he commissed Alexander S. Jolly to design a weekend retreat on the property and called it 'The Gem'.

'The Gem', a stone and timber cabin now known as Hy Brasil, was built in 1936. Another change in ownership occurred in February 1949 and Rachel Jane Donaldson became the registered proprietor of the property. She held the ownership of the house until when it was bought by Ted Herman in 1958. The name Hy Brasil is associated the mythical Irish island of Brasil, also called Hy Brasil, which in Irish folk legend is an island that contains the Garden of Eden.

Hy Brasil was nominated for a Permanent Conservation Order in 1980 by the Herman family. The Order was placed on 31 July 1981 and was transferred to the New South Wales State Heritage Register on 2 April 1999.

== Description ==
Hy Brasil originally comprised a main living space with verandahs to the west and east facades and bedroom and kitchen to the south facade. Constructed of local rock faced Hawkesbury sandstone. The house has been planned around a large central stone fireplace and the use of natural materials of stone and timber represents a distinct "organic" design philosophy. Particular interest exists with the fireplace structure as the mantel consists of a three-metre-long (nine-point-eight-foot) stone slab.

The house has a contemporary style in its design influenced by Californian Bungalow and Organic architectural movements with the use of large picture windows, exposed internal stained timber rafters and beams coupled with a low pitched horizontal roof.

Hy Brasil which derives its name from the mythical Isle location of the Garden of Eden, has magnificent views of the Tasman Sea to the east and Pittwater to the west. Pedestrian access to the house is via a narrow winding pathway up a steep slope through large sandstone boulders.

Native trees have been retained around the house and supplemented by plantings of ornamental exotics, notably sweet gum (Liquidambar styraciflua), pampas grass (Cortaderia sp.), fruit salad plant (Monstera deliciosa), tree ferns (Cyathea sp.), giant bird-of-paradise flower (Strelitzia nicolai) and azaleas (Rhododendron indicum cv.s).

Cover use has been made of the local sandstone which has been cut to provide steps, garden seats, retaining walls, pools and a barbeque.

The area to the west of the house contains terraced lawns leading down to a sandstone cliff which forms a well-defined boundary to the property. Below the cliff, natural bushland extends down to the properties below.

The overall impression of Hy Brasil's setting is one of blending of the house into natural bushland.

== Heritage listing ==
As at 29 October 2007, Hy Brasil is of State significance as one of three "organic" houses designed by Alexander Stewart Jolly in Avalon. Hy Brasil with its simple construction of stone and timber and set in its native bushland setting represents Jolly's architecture and philosophy regarding the built form and its relationship to the natural Australian landscape.

Hy Brasil was listed on the New South Wales State Heritage Register on 2 April 1999 having satisfied the following criteria.

The place is important in demonstrating the course, or pattern, of cultural or natural history in New South Wales.

Hy Brasil is of State significance as an excellent example of twentieth century "organic" architecture and is one of three listed works by Alexander Stewart Jolly. The unique bushland setting of the building, large tile and stone terracing form an integral part of the design philosophy. This distinctive style influenced the later "Sydney School" architectural movement of the mid sixties.

The place is important in demonstrating aesthetic characteristics and/or a high degree of creative or technical achievement in New South Wales.

The ridge-top siting of Hy Brasil is prominent from the surrounding area and takes advantage of superb panoramic views of the Tasman Sea and Pittwater. Native bushland has been retained and enhanced by the well chosen exotic ornamental planting to provide a setting which complements the natural qualities of the house.

== See also ==
- Australian residential architectural styles
