= St Michaels Cave (Avalon Beach) =

Cave in New South Wales, Australia

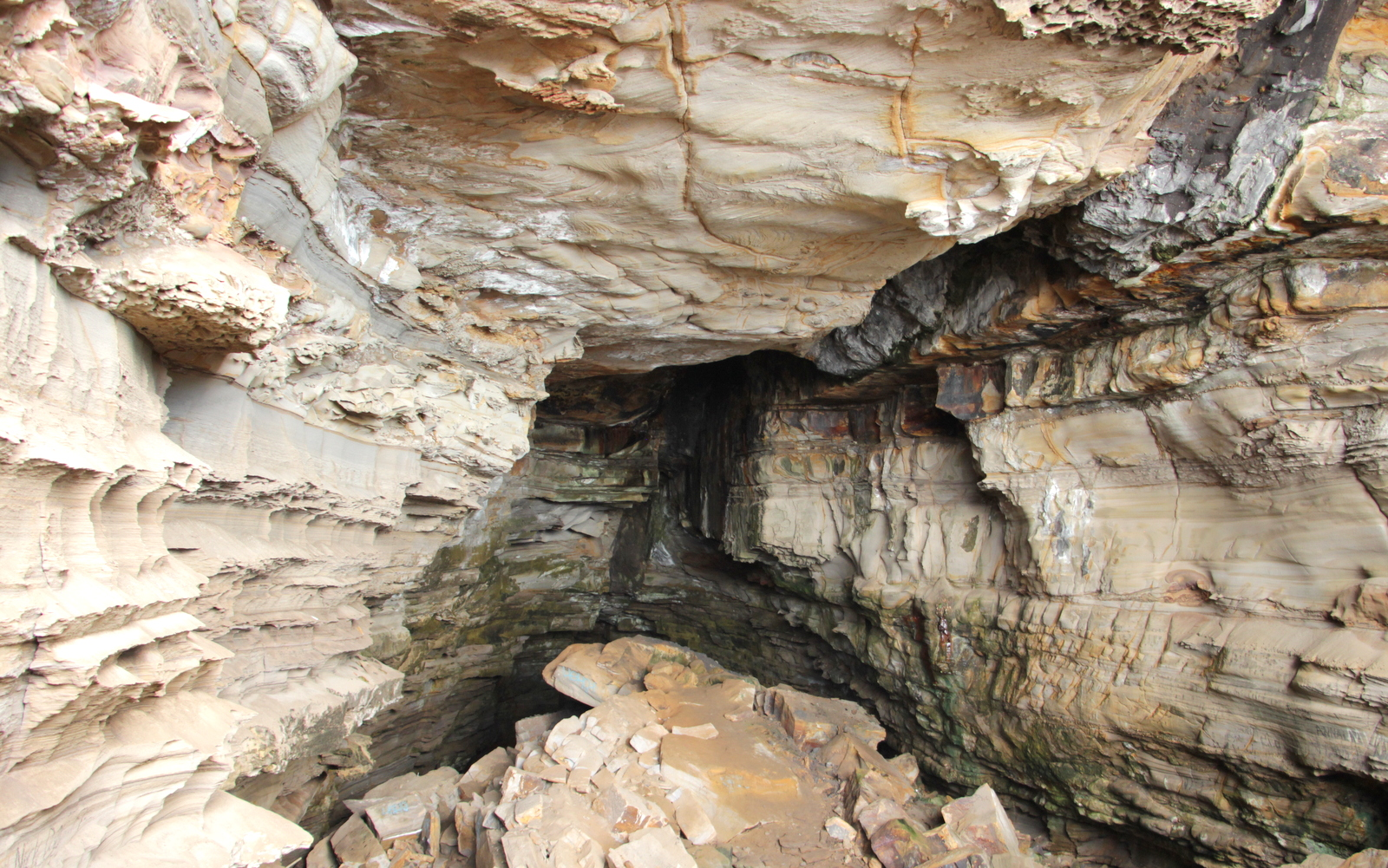
- Interactive map of St Michaels Cave
- Location: Avalon Beach, New South Wales, Australia
- Coordinates: 33°37′44.83″S 151°20′21.23″E
- Depth: 15 m (49 ft)
- Length: 110 m (360 ft)
- Geology: Dolerite & Narrabeen Group
- Hazards: falling rocks
- Access: not allowed

St Michaels Cave
- Location within New South Wales
- Location: New South Wales
- Coordinates: 33.62912°S 151.33923°E
- Governing body: Pittwater Council

St Michaels Cave is situated in the Sydney suburb of Avalon Beach. This sea-side cave is around 110 metres long, 15 metres high and 10 metres wide. The original colonial owner was a Reverend John Therry, who planned to deliver lectures within the cave and build a church above it. The cave was formed by the erosion of a jurassic dyke through triassic sedimentary rocks. The cave is known to be a breeding site for Common bent-wing bats and Large-eared pied bats.

== See also ==
- Sydney Basin
- Newport Formation (NSW)
- Bald Hill Claystone
- Narrabeen group
