= Telopea light rail station =

Light rail station in Sydney, Australia

Telopea
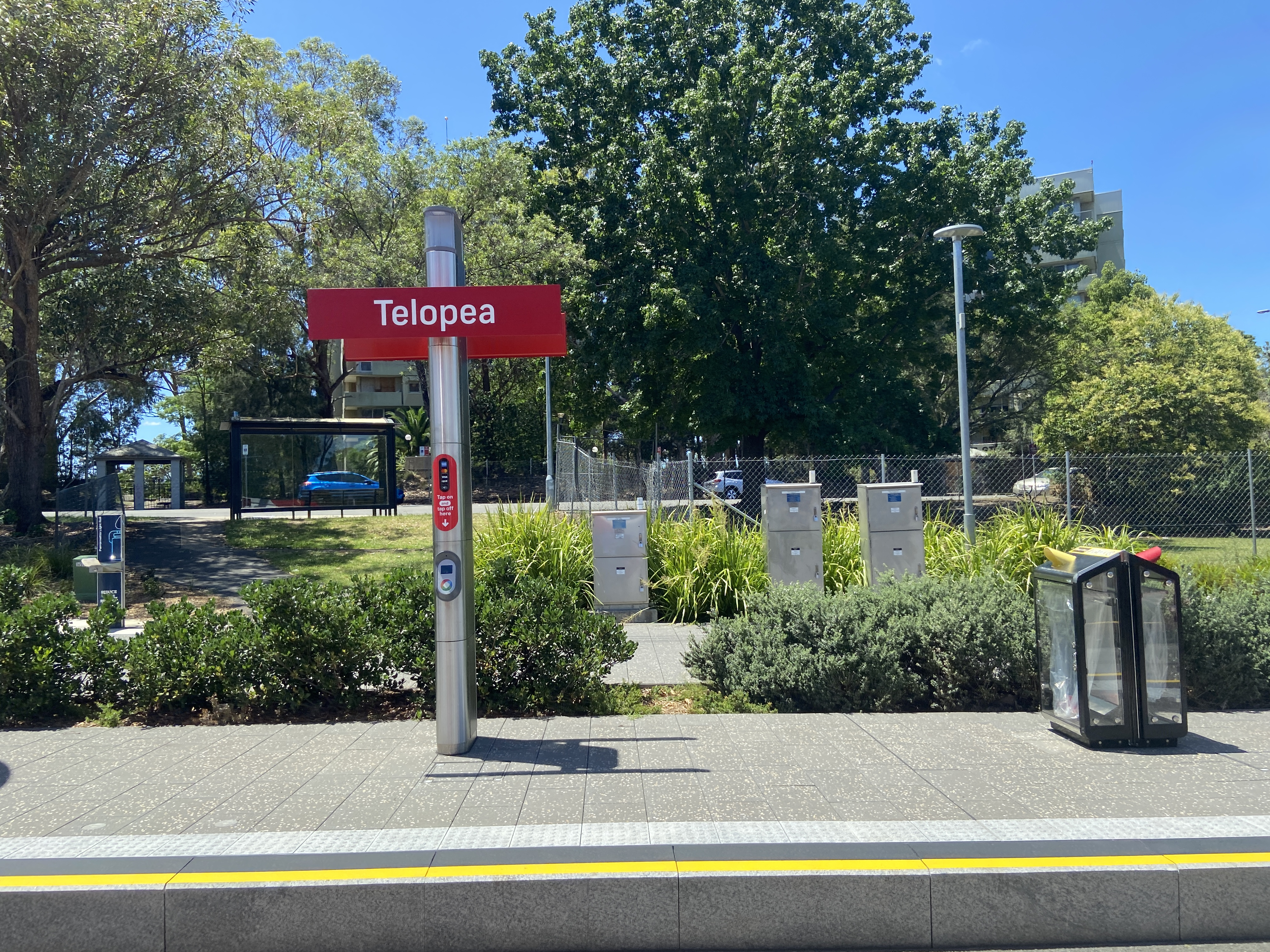
- View of a station sign on the platform, December 2024

General information
- Location: Adderton Road, Telopea; Sydney, New South Wales; Australia
- Coordinates: 33°47′37″S 151°02′30″E
- Elevation: 64 metres (210 ft)
- Owner: Transport Asset Manager of New South Wales
- Operator: Transdev Australasia
- Line: Parramatta Light Rail
- Platforms: 2 (2 side)
- Tracks: 2
- Connections: Bus

Construction
- Structure type: Ground
- Accessible: Yes

Other information
- Status: Unstaffed
- Website: Telopea Light Rail

History
- Opened: 13 June 1925 (101 years ago) (as heavy rail); 20 December 2024 (21 months ago) (as light rail)
- Closed: 5 January 2020 (6 years ago) (as heavy rail)
- Rebuilt: 2020–2024

Passengers
- 2013: 290 (daily) (Sydney Trains, NSW TrainLink)
- Rank: 210

Services
Preceding station	Parramatta Light Rail	Following station
Dundas towards Westmead	Westmead & Carlingford Line	Carlingford Terminus
Former services
Preceding station	Sydney Trains	Following station
Carlingford Terminus	Carlingford Line (1885–2020)	Dundas towards Clyde
Location

Telopea light rail station is a light rail station and former suburban railway station located on the Parramatta Light Rail, serving the Sydney suburb of Telopea. It is served by Sydney Light Rail L4 Westmead & Carlingford line services.

== History ==
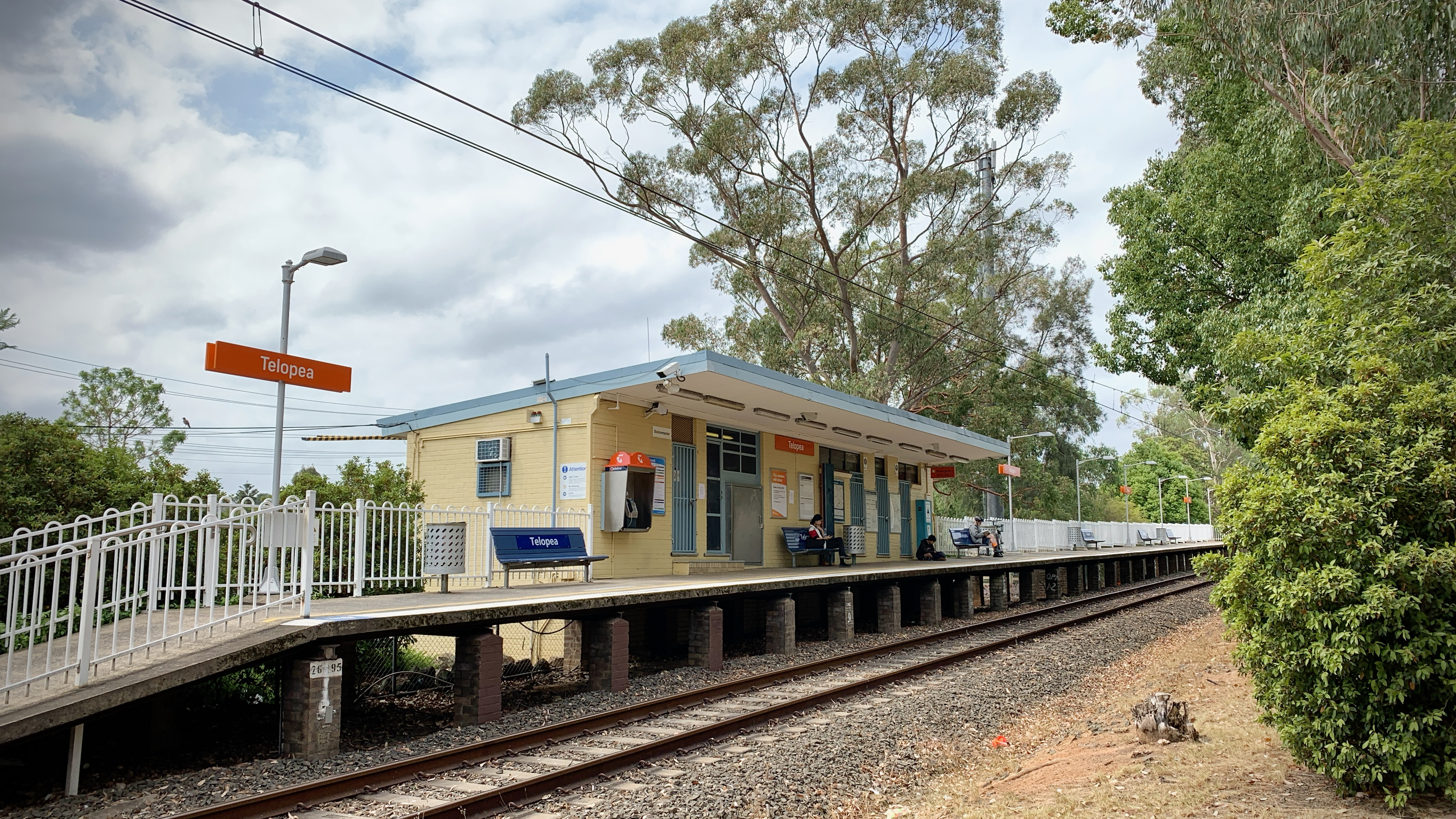
Northeastbound view of the original station in December 2019

Telopea was an infill station, opening on 13 June 1925. As a suburban railway station, it was located on the Carlingford line, and served by Sydney Trains T6 Carlingford line services. The Carlingford railway line closed on 5 January 2020, and the station was demolished in May of that year.

The Camellia to Carlingford section of the Carlingford railway line was converted to light rail as part of the Parramatta Light Rail. The converted light rail station opened on 20 December 2024, as part of Stage 1 of the Parramatta Light Rail.

== Services ==
=== Platforms ===
The station is served by light rail as follows:

Line	Stopping pattern	Notes
Parramatta Light Rail	services to Westmead & Carlingford	

At the time the station closed to suburban services, it was served as follows:

Platform	Line	Stopping pattern	Notes
1	T6	services to Carlingford services to Clyde	

=== Transport links ===
Busways operates one bus route via Telopea station:

- 545: Parramatta station to Macquarie Park via Telopea & Eastwood
