= Walter Burley Griffin Lodge =

- Location within NE Sydney
- 33°38′29″S 151°19′22″E
- Location: 32 Plateau Road, Avalon Beach, New South Wales, Australia

History
- Built: 1933–1934

Site notes
- Architect: Walter Burley Griffin
- Owner: National Trust of Australia (NSW)

New South Wales Heritage Register
- Official name: Walter Burley Griffin Lodge; Burley Griffin Lodge; Stella James House
- Type: State heritage (built)
- Designated: 1 March 2002
- Reference no.: 1510
- Type: House
- Category: Residential buildings (private)

The Walter Burley Griffin Lodge is a heritage-listed former residence, holiday house and weekender and now residence located at 32 Plateau Road, Avalon Beach, New South Wales, Australia. It was designed by Walter Burley Griffin and built from 1933 to 1934. It is also known as Burley Griffin Lodge or Stella James House. The property is owned by the New South Wales branch of the National Trust of Australia.

== History ==
Walter Burley Griffin was born near Chicago and trained at Nathan Clifford Ricker's School of Architecture at the University of Illinois, graduating in 1899. From 1901–1906, he worked as an associate of Frank Lloyd Wright at Oak Park. Griffin started his own practice in 1906 and within a few years established his reputation as an architect of the Prairie School. In 1911, Griffin married Marion Mahony, who had graduated in architecture from the Massachusetts Institute of Technology and worked as Wright's head designer.

Inspired by the designs by Frederick Law Olmsted (often called the founder of American landscape architecture) of New York's Central Park and his "green necklace" of parks in Boston, landscape design was the career Walter Burley Griffin would have pursued had the opportunity offered. He had approached Chicago landscape gardener Ossian Cole Simonds for career advice before entering the University of Illinois in 1895. Apparently unsatisfied with the lack of relevant curriculum, Simonds urged him to pursue architecture and study landscape gardening on his own, as he himself had done. Griffin took what classes he could and, like Simonds and landscape gardener Jens Jensen, shared an approach to landscape design through architecture, an interest in civic design, urbanism and planning.

In 1902 there were only six "landscape gardeners" (and no landscape architects) listed in the Lakeside Annual Directory of the City of Chicago. In 1912 only two landscape architects and 13 landscape gardeners were listed.

Griffin's practice as a landscape architect was first featured in a public text in Wilhelm Miller's The Prairie Spirit in Landscape Gardening (1915), which included Griffin as an exponent (along with Jensen, Simonds and architect Frank Lloyd Wright) of his proposed American regional "Prairie" style. Simonds, Griffin and Miller had all attended the first national meeting of the American Society of Landscape Architects (ASLA) in 1913 in Chicago.

By 1914 Griffin and his architect wife Marion Mahony had moved to Australia after winning the 1912 international design competition for the federal capital, Canberra with a scheme based on its topography, a distinctly non-prairie valley landscape of undulating hills. This was a project they had worked on together.

By 1919, there were problems with the Canberra project and Griffin resigned his position as Federal Capital Director of Design and Construction. He then formed the Greater Sydney Development Association to purchase 263 hectares (650 acres) in Middle Harbour, which became known as Castlecrag. He devoted the next fifteen years to developing and promoting the area, while maintaining an architectural practice.

Griffin believed dwellings should play a subordinate role in the scheme of nature. His houses were small and intimate. He aimed toward the most natural use of land and the selection of indigenous plants. He also developed an economical construction system of pre-cast interlocking structural tiles, which he called "Knitlock", and used it widely, as well as stone, in the houses of Castlecrag. In the early 1930s, Griffin built incinerators for the destruction of household garbage in various cities and suburbs in the eastern states of Australia. They provided a canvas for experimentation with form and texture for the architect, but sadly few have survived.

Griffin's work took him to India in 1935 and he died there two years later of peritonitis.

Griffin's contribution to the development of the Wrightian / Prairie School style internationally has begun to receive attention from architectural historians in recent years. It is now increasingly acknowledged that Griffin contributed a number of fresh concepts to the Prairie School, most noticeably: his attention to vertical space (a development leading directly to the ubiquitous split-level style post-war houses); "open plan" living and dining areas dominated by a large central fireplace; and the extensive domestic use of reinforced concrete.

Griffin is also internationally renowned for his work as a landscape architect, especially the innovative town planning design of Canberra and Castlecrag, Griffith and Leeton.

Griffin's design approaches to landscape and architecture informed one another. Landscape itself, for example, crucially served as a basis for architecture - a conviction first made explicit in the Canberra publicity, Griffin noting (in Chicago) that: "...a building should ideally be "the logical outgrowth of the environment in which [it is] located"." In Australia, he hoped to "evolve an indigenous type, one similarly derived from and adapted to local climate, climate and topography." In Australia the scale and number of his landscape commissions grew considerably, including a number of town plans. Griffin signed many of his drawings with the term "landscape architect".

== The Stella James House / Walter Burley Griffin Lodge ==
In 1931 Clare Grant Stevenson joined Berlei Ltd as Training and Research Officer and stayed with the company until her retirement in 1960. In 1960 she was appointed a Member of Order of the British Empire (OBE) for her services to the community. In 1984 she and Honor Darling edited The WAAF Book and in 1988 she was made a Member of the Order of Australia.

Walter Burley Griffin Lodge is built on an allotment of land known as Lot 342 in deposited plan DP 16902. By October 1933 Griffin had designed a two bedroom stone cottage (weekender) for the site and it is assumed that it was completed on Lot 342 some time in 1934. Stella Florence James and Clare Stevenson utilised the property as a holiday retreat. Stevenson had captioned a 1938 photograph of the house by saying she spent many weekends there from when it was constructed in 1933.

Lot 342 was purchased by Stella James and Rose Winter on 2 January 1936 and Rose Winter's half share was transferred to Stella James in 1941. Lot 343 was purchased by Clare Stevenson in 1939. Clare Stevenson purchased Lot 346 from Sydney Ancher in 1946. Clare Stevenson in Lot 344 in 1953. The fact that Stella James did not own the land until 1936 poses questions as to her relationship with the owner of the land, James Welton of Kings Cross.

Stevenson and James formed a lifelong relationship, living together until James' death in 1974. James and Stevenson lived in a number of apartments in Potts Point over the years but spent as many weekends as possible at . Stevenson wrote on the back of a copy of the November 1964 issue of the Trust Bulletin:

This is the cottage where I spend hundred of weekends from when it was built (sic) 1933 to when I could no longer go when Stella was ill. Too steep to get the chair down.

— Clare Stevenson, c. 1964.

In the early 1960s architect Sydney Archer sympathetically extended the north-east corner to enlarge the sleeping accommodation.

The property was donated to the Trust in 1964 at which time it consisted of 6 allotments: Lots 341, 342, 343,344, 345, and 346. Clare Grant Stevenson donated lots 341, 345 and possibly 346, Stella Florence James donated Lot 342 (including the house) and Stella James and Hilda Mary Lyons donated Lot 344.

== Description ==
A holiday cottage constructed in 1934. The site is steeply sloping, featuring tall stands of eucalyptus and angophoras. The house clearly shows Griffins ideal of integrating house with site. The construction is of squared stone blocks, timber framing, with sloping roofs covered with bitumenised felt. Accommodation originally comprised a central living area, two bedrooms, a kitchen and bathroom, with a garage on a higher level. In the early 1960s architect Sydney Archer sympathetically extended the north - east corner to enlarge the sleeping accommodation. The living area is designed around a central stone chimney block, and three main rooms opening northwards onto a grassed terrace, through doors of characteristic Griffin design (triangular bracing elements). The sloping boarded ceilings create a "church like" interior accented by circular reinforced concrete columns. The massive chimney block is the central focus of the design both inside and out.

=== Condition ===
As at 27 July 2000, the physical condition was good.

Most of the original details remain, except for the roof which was apparently largely constructed in 1978 because of severe termite damage and the stone entry path which replaced the timber rounds stepping stones in 1982.

Ancher's addition of a third bedroom in 1957 has been described as sympathetic. The addition commissioned by the original owner is of significant testimony to the changing fashion of the 1950s when architects in Sydney were jettisoning the past in the name of post – war reconstruction and creating a new humanist world.

=== Modifications and dates ===
Prior to 1957 an outside toilet was constructed, attached to the west wall of the house and connected to a septic tank still exists.

The original laundry was designed behind the lightweight wall separating the Laundry from the Garage.

In Archer's 1957 alterations, the washing machine was installed in the bathroom. The washing machine remains in the bathroom and there appears to be little trace of the former Laundry at the end of this Garage.

Some time between 1934 and 1957 a terrace was built to the north of the house. Griffin's blueprint shows no terrace and a difference between the floor level of the house and the natural ground approximately 1.5 metres (4 ft 11 in).

In 1957 Archer designed a third bedroom to the north of bedroom 2 which was constructed partly on the fill of the terrace and partly suspended over the bridge of the terrace.

Archer's 1957 drawings show the window in the east wall of bedroom 2 and the south wall of Bedroom 1 to be existing windows. However the window in the south wall of Bedroom 1 appears to be a Griffin window and it was possibly relocated from the north wall of Bedroom 2 when the wall was partially demolished for the Ancher addition. The window in the east wall of Bedroom 1 is totally different to other windows in detail so it is possible that is could have been installed prior to 1957.

The addition of a free standing bench and another set of cupboards and bench. As late 1973 the house was connected to the town water supply in Plateau Rd and a double bowl model had replaced the original kitchen sink.

== Heritage listing ==
As at 27 July 2000, one of the finest surviving example of a small house by Griffin, and a generally holistic example of planning, siting and "organic" design. The surrounding bushland reveal the original character of the Newport district. The social connection of Clare Stevenson and Stella James can be seen through the updated design layout of the house, with their planning strategies highlighted by the use of physical, social and environmental techniques all aimed toward working in harmony with the natural environment.

Walter Burley Griffin Lodge was listed on the New South Wales State Heritage Register on 1 March 2002 having satisfied the following criteria.

The place is important in demonstrating the course, or pattern, of cultural or natural history in New South Wales.

Walter Burley Griffin Lodge is significant as a rare intact example of a small Walter Burley Griffin house, built as a holiday weekender retaining the principle elements of its original setting. Secondly value as a fine example of the area post World War I and for which the area is still noted. Thirdly the house, as altered, is an example of 1950s fashion and the period's disregard for past architectural styles in its desire to remake the world after World War II.

The place is important in demonstrating aesthetic characteristics and/or a high degree of creative or technical achievement in New South Wales.

On a steep site dense native vegetation, the house shows Griffin's ideal of visually integrating structure with site. The vegetation on the site is a rare remnant of the original endemic coastal open forest (of Spotted Gum, Grey Ironbark and Angophora).

The place has a strong or special association with a particular community or cultural group in New South Wales for social, cultural or spiritual reasons.

The design symbolized the unity of composition created from the duality of the two bedrooms and perhaps symbolized the unity of Stella James and Clare Stevenson in their relationship, a unity composed of two distinct individuals.

The place has potential to yield information that will contribute to an understanding of the cultural or natural history of New South Wales.

Walter Burley Griffin Lodge represents an example of architecture by Griffin and has the ability to reveal information about his design and integrating the built form into the landscape.

The place is important in demonstrating the principal characteristics of a class of cultural or natural places/environments in New South Wales.

The house represents an example for 1950s fashion and the period's disregard for past architectural styles in constructions after World War II.

== See also ==
- Australian residential architectural styles
