= Telopea, New South Wales =

Telopea
- Suburb
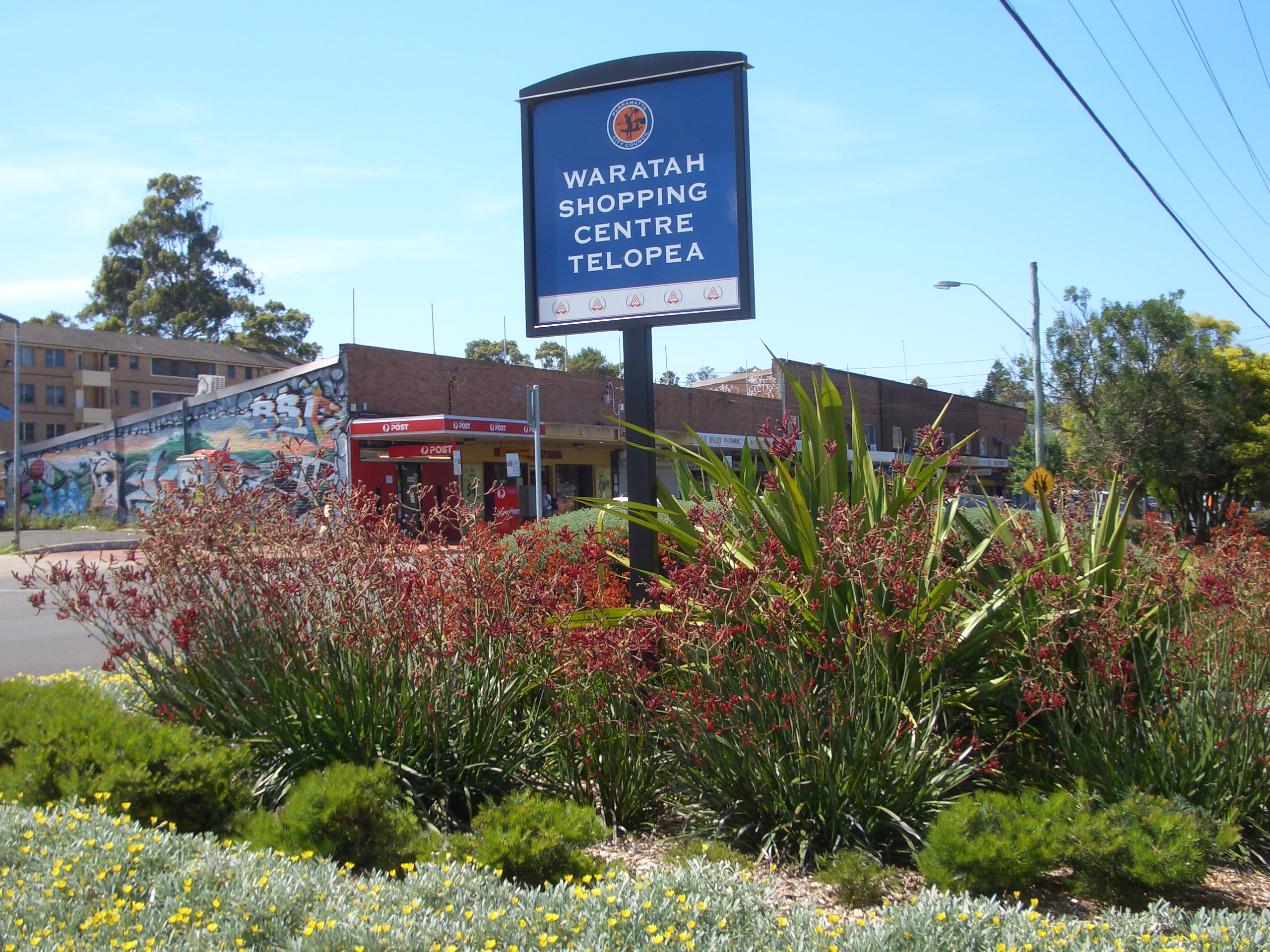
- Waratah Shopping Centre c. 2007

- Interactive map of Telopea
- Country: Australia
- State: New South Wales
- City: Sydney
- LGA: City of Parramatta
- Location: 23 km (14 mi) north-west of Sydney CBD

Government
  - State electorate: Epping
  - Federal division: Parramatta

Area
  - Total: 1.5 km^{2} (0.58 sq mi)
- Elevation: 40 m (130 ft)

Population
  - Total: 5,356 (2021 census)
  - Density: 3,570/km^{2} (9,250/sq mi)
- Postcode: 2117
Suburbs around Telopea
| North Parramatta | Carlingford | Carlingford |
| Oatlands | Telopea | Dundas Valley |
| North Parramatta | Rydalmere | Dundas |

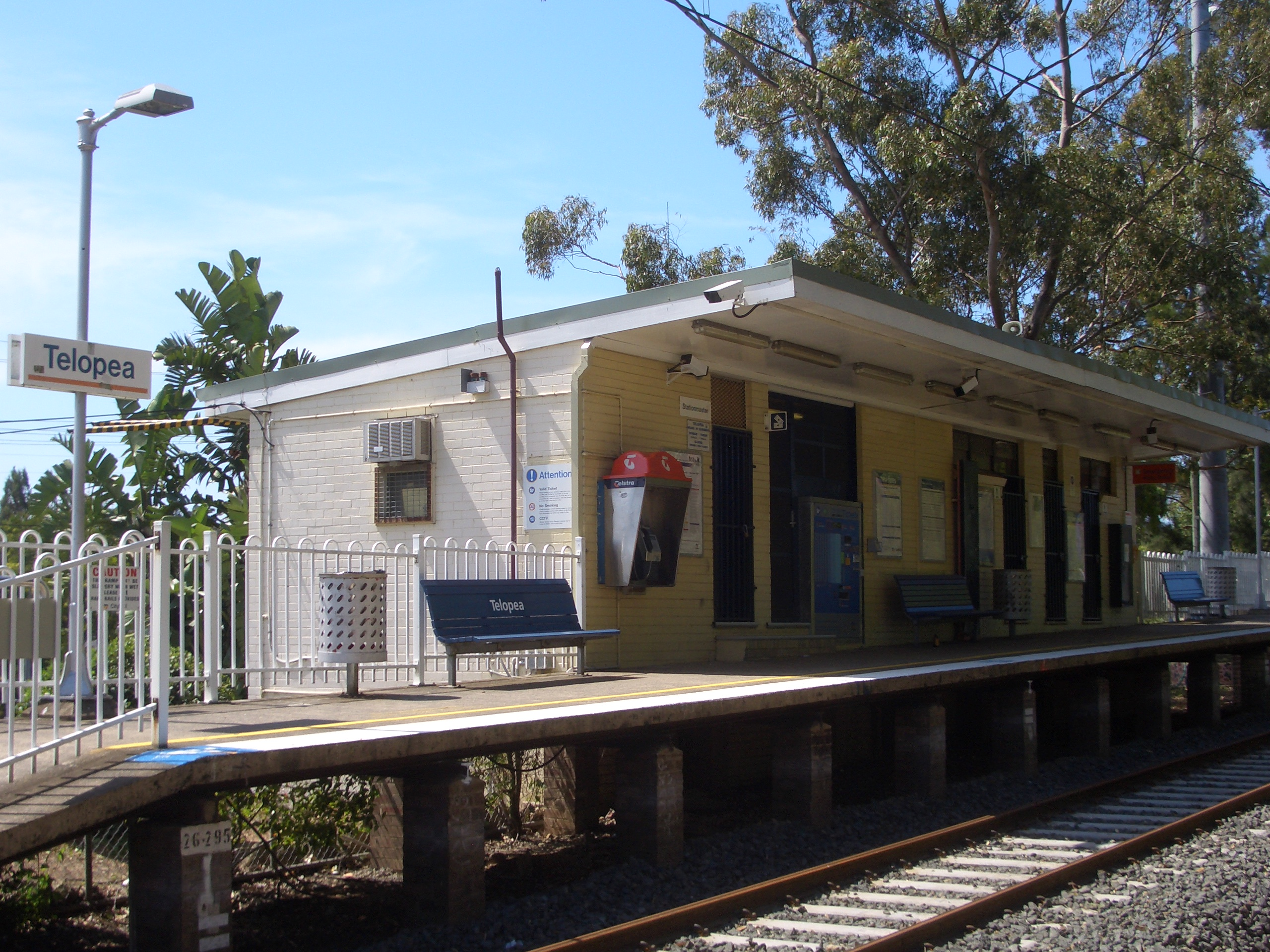
Telopea Railway Station

Telopea /təloʊpiə/ is a suburb of Greater Western Sydney, in the state of New South Wales, Australia. Telopea is located 23 kilometres north-west of the Sydney central business district, in the local government area of the City of Parramatta. The suburb is bordered by Kissing Point Road to the south and Pennant Hills Road to the north.

== Name ==
Telopea is named from Telopea speciosissima, the New South Wales waratah, a plant that was abundant in the area before it was colonized and which became the floral emblem of New South Wales.

== Transport ==
The area is serviced by Busways bus routes 545 and 513.

Telopea light rail station, a former heavy rail station now on the Parramatta Light Rail line, serves the area running parallel to Adderton Road.

== Commercial area ==
Waratah Shopping Centre, located on Benaud Place, has many retail shops including a newsagent, chemist, kebab shop, post office, bakery and a hair and beauty salon. A small group of shops is also located opposite the railway station on Adderton Road.

== Housing ==
Telopea is mainly low to low-medium density housing with most of the dwellings having been built after World War II. The suburb is bisected by the Carlingford railway line with most of the medium-density housing lying adjacent to the train line.

== Parks ==
Telopea contains a large tract of bushland on its western edge, backing onto the Oatlands golf course. The bushland, the Vineyard Creek Reserve as it is known contains a spring-fed creek and has several waterfalls on its course before it disappears beneath Kissing Point road to the south. The creek and the bushland are protected as environmental areas.

== Places of worship ==
- The local Anglican Church meets in Telopea on Saturday evenings and at Dundas on Sundays.
- Telopea Christian Centre is another local Church.

== Community facilities ==
Local facilities include a primary school, an alternative educational facility, a library, community hall and a community garden.

== Heritage listings ==
Telopea has a number of heritage-listed sites, including:

- 34 Adderton Road: Redstone

== Population ==
At the 2021 census, Telopea recorded a population of 5,356. Of these:

- The age distribution was quite similar to the country in general. The median age was 40 years, similar to the national median. Children aged 0–14 years made up 18.1% of the population (national average is 18.2%) and people aged 65 years and over made up 16.3% of the population (national average is 17.2%).
- 43.4% of people were born in Australia. The most common countries of birth were China 15.2%, South Korea 7.1%, India 2.6%, Hong Kong 2.5% and Iran 1.8%. 36.3% of people only spoke English at home. Other languages spoken at home included Mandarin 16.6%, Korean 9.6%, Cantonese 8.8%, Arabic 3.6% and Persian 2.0%.
- The most common responses for religion were No Religion 34.2%, Catholic 18.4% and Not stated 7.0%.
