= Avalon Beach =

- Suburb
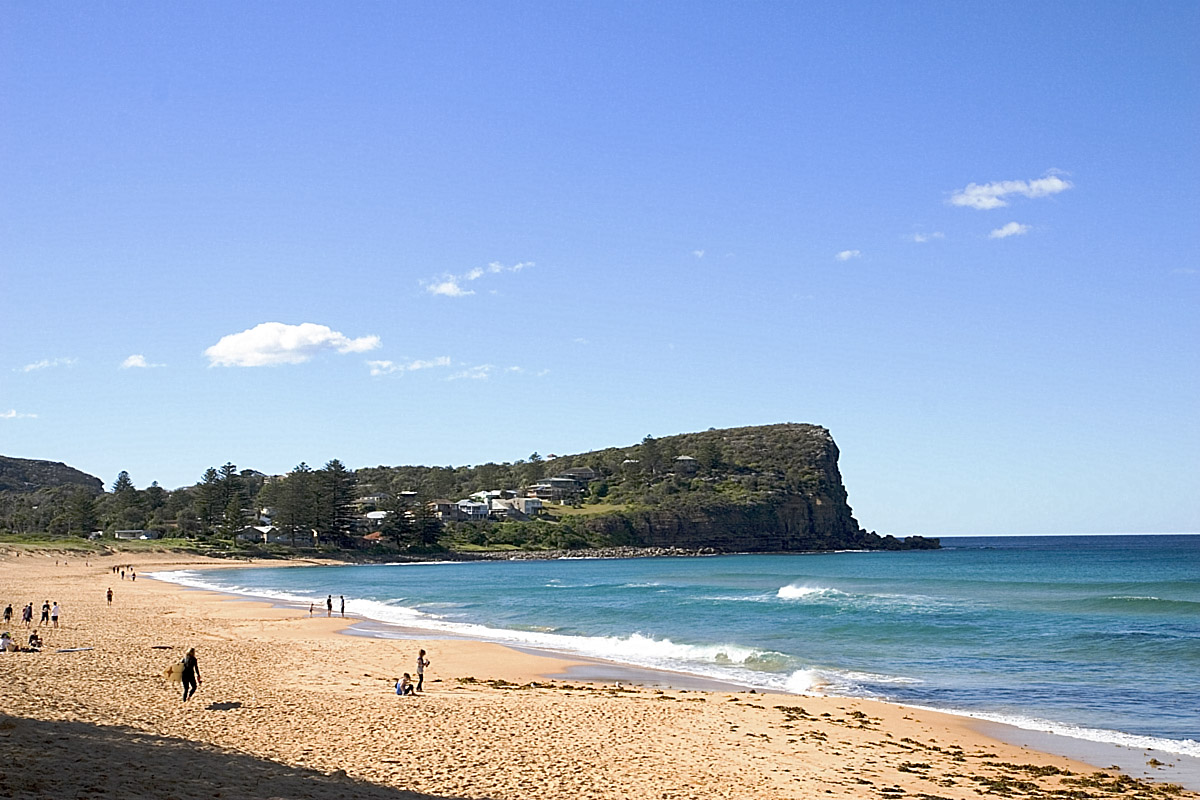
- Avalon Beach, looking north

- Interactive map of Avalon Beach
- Country: Australia
- State: New South Wales
- City: Sydney
- LGA: Northern Beaches Council
- Location: 28 km (17 mi) north of Sydney CBD
- Established: 1921

Government
  - State electorate: Pittwater
  - Federal division: Mackellar
- Elevation: 9 m (30 ft)

Population
  - Total: 10,379 (SAL 2021)
- Postcode: 2107
Suburbs around Avalon Beach
Careel Bay	Palm Beach	Whale Beach
Clareville	Avalon Beach	Tasman Sea
Bilgola	Newport	Tasman Sea

Avalon Beach is a northern beachside suburb of Sydney, in the state of New South Wales, Australia. It is 28 kilometres north of the Sydney central business district, in the local government area of Northern Beaches Council, in the Northern Beaches region. The area was previously called Avalon, with the name Avalon Beach being assigned during a change in boundaries and names in the Pittwater region in 2012.

== History ==
The Pittwater and Northern Beaches area was formerly inhabited by the Garigal or Caregal people in a region known as Guringai country.

=== European settlement ===
Avalon was named after the mythical Avalon, a legendary island in Celtic languages mythology. According to legends, Avalon was an earthly paradise and the final resting place of King Arthur.

The first land grant in the area was 240,000 square metres (60 acres) to John Farrell in 1827. In 1833 a 4.9-square-kilometre (1,200-acre) land grant was made to Australia's first Catholic priest, John Joseph Therry, by Governor Bourke. A further grant of 280 acres made in 1837 meant that Therry's holdings covered most of the peninsula from Newport to Whale Beach. He built a church in this area but his plans for a settlement never eventuated. After he died, the land was left to the Jesuit order and was then sold to help finance the rebuilding of St Mary's Cathedral in Sydney. In the 1920s, the area was still known as 'Priest's Flat'. Arthur J Small handled a subdivision in 1921 and chose the name Avalon. Lots were sold for £100 each and included two years free membership in the local golf club.

Significant housing developments took place during the 1920s. The architect Alexander Stewart Jolly designed a number of houses that were built in the Avalon area in that period. Loggan Rock was a flamboyant log cabin combined with a stone tower; the combination of logs and rocks gave rise to the name. The house is heritage-listed. Careel House is a bungalow made of stone that was quarried in the area. Nowadays it is on the Whale Beach side of the boundary. It is also heritage-listed. Hy Brasil, located near Clareville, was built in 1936, but was originally known as The Gem. Later it was bought by Ted Herman, son of the painter Sali Herman, who changed the name, using the name of a mythical island west of Ireland. It is heritage-listed. A sandstone cottage known as Wickham, designed by Walter Burley Griffin, was demolished with council approval in 1994.

Another significant development was the creation of Ruskin Rowe in 1950. This street was designed as an estate by the architect Harry Ruskin Rowe, son of the architect Thomas Rowe. Rowe created covenants to preserve the character of the estate, but they have been ignored to an extent over the years. Nevertheless, the estate is heritage-listed because of its historic significance, as well as its scientific significance in preserving the bushland environment of the area.

=== Early subdivision plans ===
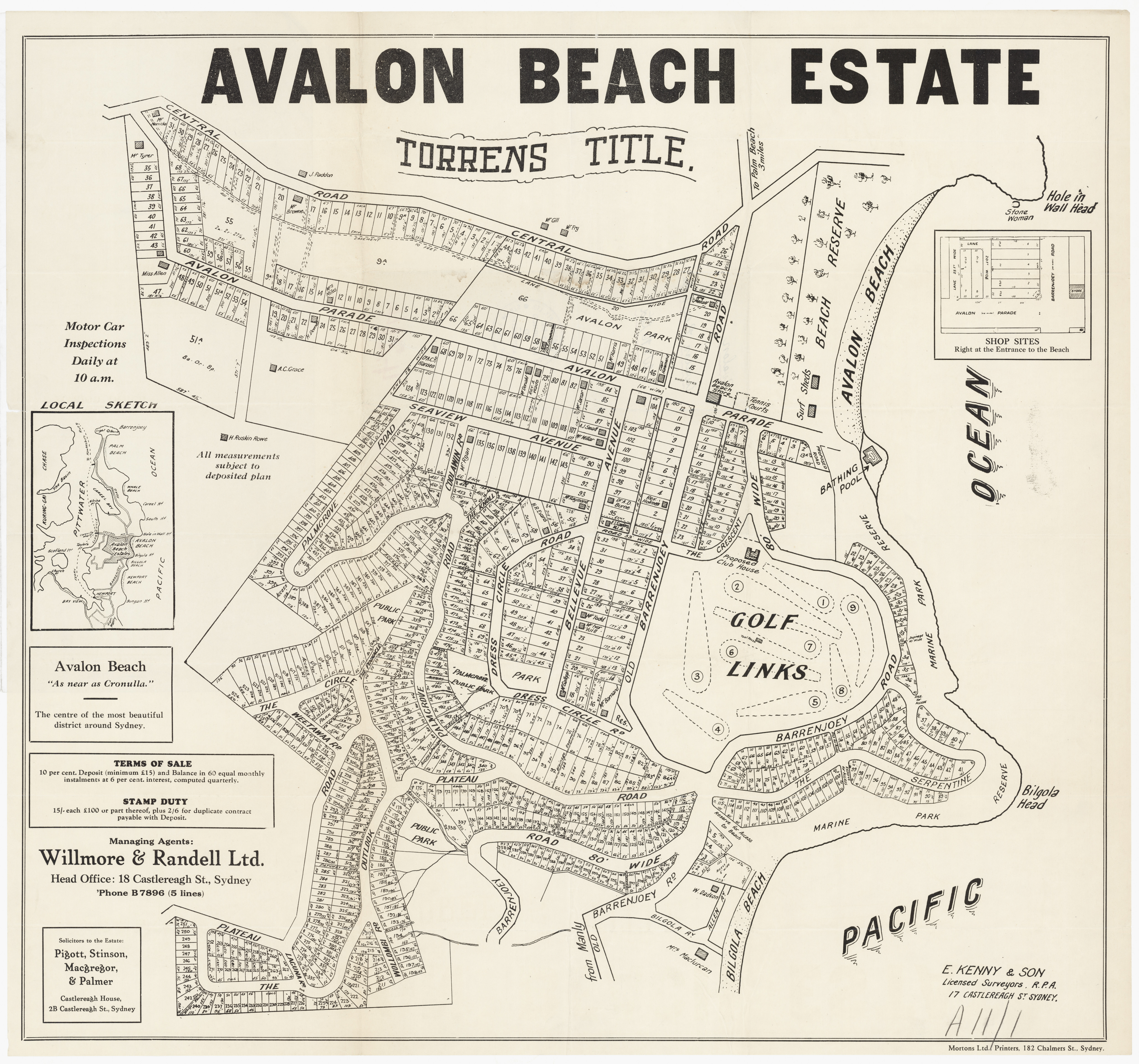
Avalon Beach Estate Plateau Rd, Park Reserve, 1921–1926

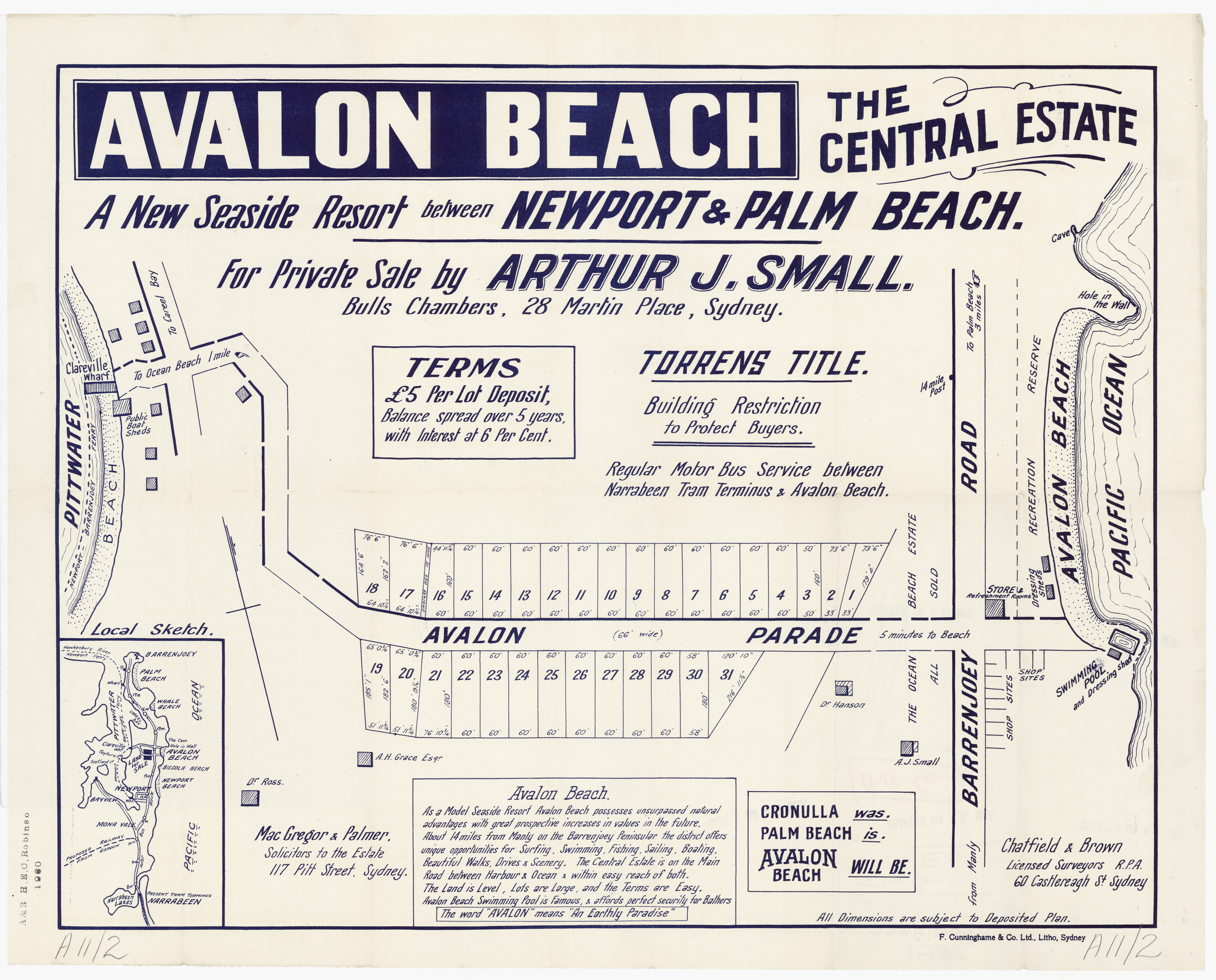
Avalon Beach Central Estate, Avalon Pde, Barrenjoey Rd, 1921–1926

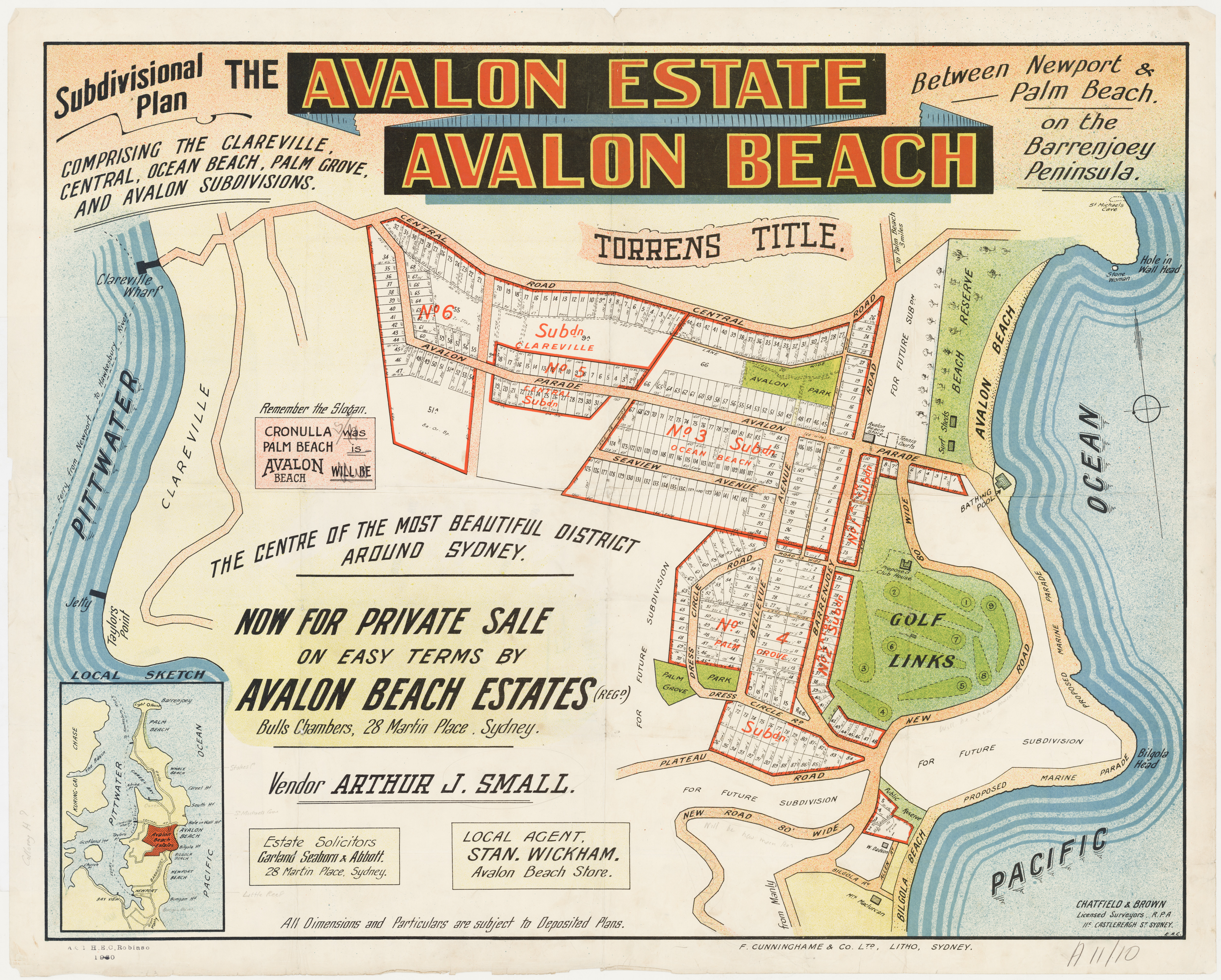
Avalon Beach Estates, Central Rd, Plateau Rd, 1921–1926

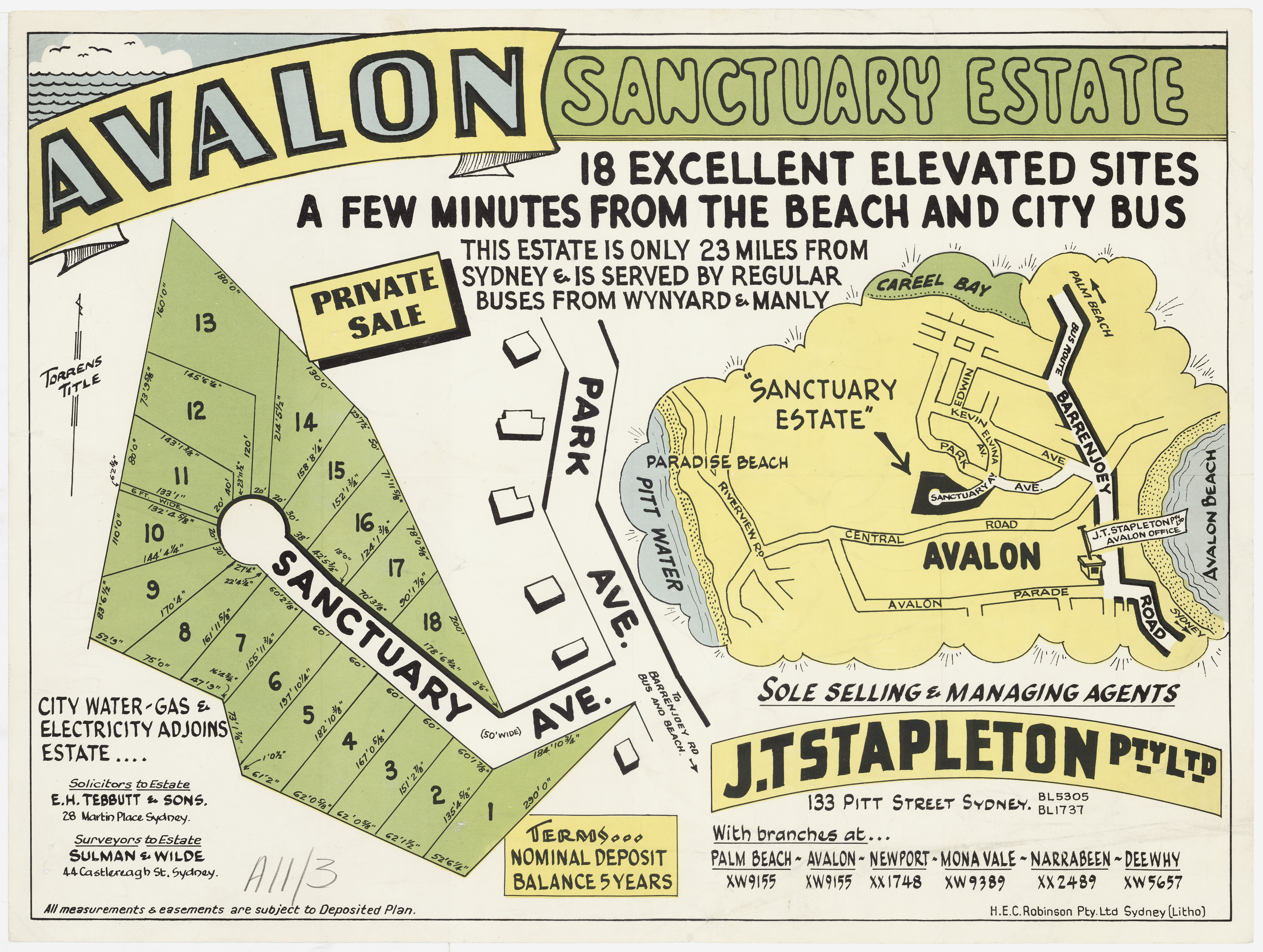
Avalon Sanctuary Estate, Park Ave, 1921–1926

== Geography ==
Avalon Beach is situated on the Barrenjoey Peninsula, flanked by Careel Bay on Pittwater to the west and the Tasman Sea to the east. The beach is renowned for its rich orange-coloured sand, caused by high levels of iron oxide, contrasting with the yellow sands found along Sydney's southern beaches.

The coastline features steep Hawkesbury sandstone headlands, including Careel Head to the north and Bangalley Head to the south.

=== St Michael's Cave ===
A notable coastal feature at Careel Head is St Michael's Cave. The cave was formed by the marine erosion of a volcanic dyke running through the cliff face, alongside the subsequent erosion of adjacent soft shales and sandstones.

=== St Michael's Arch ===
St Michael's Arch, also known as the Hole in the Wall, was a prominent natural arch on Careel Head standing nearly 12 metres (39 ft) tall and 7 metres (23 ft) wide. The feature was named alongside the neighbouring cave by Father John Joseph Therry in the 1830s, who had received a land grant encompassing the headland and planned to build a church dedicated to St Michael atop the cliff. The arch also served as a prominent maritime landmark for vessels navigating the coastal waters between Port Jackson and Broken Bay.

In May 1867, the roof of the arch collapsed during a severe gale that battered the New South Wales coast for several days, leaving behind a lone column only half the height of the original structure.

Over the following decades, the Pedestal stood as a remnant sea stack, known locally by various names, including Lot’s Wife, the Stone Woman or Lady, and the Foreign Legionnaire. Continuous wave action caused its ultimate collapse into a stump in 1959.

The remaining cliff face became known as the Indian Head due to its resemblance to a stern side profile. On 11 August 2017, a major rockfall reshaped the headland silhouette, thereby losing the local moniker.

== Heritage listings ==
Avalon Beach has a number of heritage-listed sites, including:

- 32 Plateau Road: Walter Burley Griffin Lodge
- 111 Whale Beach Road: Loggan Rock

== Demographics ==
According to the 2021 census of population, there were 10,379 residents in Avalon Beach. 74.1% of people were born in Australia. The next most common countries of birth were England 9.5%, New Zealand 1.9% and United States of America 1.4%. 91.0% of people only spoke English at home. The most common responses for religious affiliation were No Religion 53.5%, Catholic 16.7% and Anglican 15.2%.

== Commercial areas ==
Avalon Beach features an RSL club, a surf club, bowling and sailing clubs; a golf club, a supermarket, shops, offices, cafes and a cinema. Cuisines include French, Vietnamese, Italian, Mexican, American Diner, Japanese, Thai and other Asian. There is a book shop, hairdresser, artisan bakery, petrol station, Red Cross Shop, bottle shop, many real estate agents, hardware store, florists and many homewares and dress shops. It is unique in that this large commercial centre is separated from the beach only by the road, a fact which until recently was used to argue against commercialisation of the beach side buildings themselves as restaurants and cafes were already so close to the beach.

== Sport and recreation ==
Avalon Beach is a surfing beach and has a 25-metre saltwater rock pool at the south end. Avalon Beach SLSC members patrol Avalon Beach. Several former surfing world champions are also past or current Avalon residents, including Ben Player.

Avalon Soccer Club, established 1982, has over 80 teams and 1000 registered players. Avalon Junior Rugby League Club has contributed several players active in the Australian National Rugby League. Avalon also has a small nine-hole golf course.

The former Pittwater Council created the Bangalley Headland Bicentennical Walk, which goes through part of the Careel Headland Reserve. The track starts at Whale Beach Road and goes to Marine Parade. The council also proposed a Plan of Management for the Bicentennial Walk in 2001, and adopted it in 2002.

== Schools ==
- Barrenjoey High School
- Avalon Public School
- Maria Regina Catholic Primary School
- Montessori public school on the former grounds of Barrenjoey Highschool

== Culture/politics ==
An episode of the American television show Baywatch was shot at Avalon Beach in the late 1990s. Producers of the show, seeking to relocate from their Californian base due to cost constraints, proposed a full relocation to Avalon and promised an upgrading of the SLSC in return, painting a huge sign saying "Avalon Beach" across the surf club. However, following complaints from residents (supported by former world surfing champion and local property owner Mark Warren), the series moved instead to Hawaii. The anti-Baywatch supporters were led by former Pittwater mayor Alex McTaggart, who was subsequently elected to NSW State Parliament for two years.

In 2011–13 there was a move by the Avalon Beach Surf Life Saving club officials, led by Christine Hopton, to replace the existing surf club. The development went ahead despite opposition from local residents in the land and environment court.

Australian drama series Blue Water High was set at Avalon Beach, and the series was filmed there.

== Gallery ==
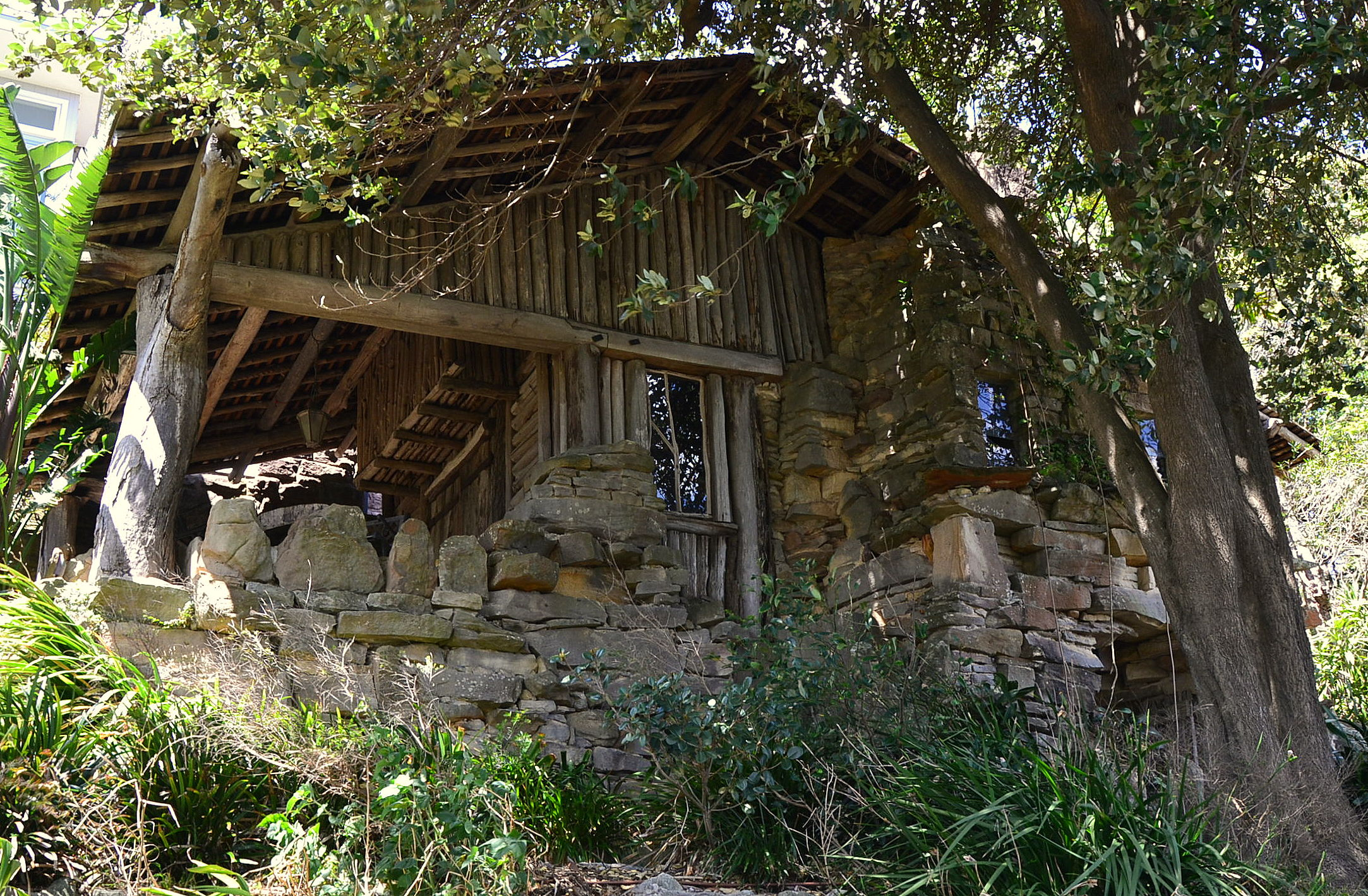
Loggan Rock, designed by Alexander Stewart Jolly

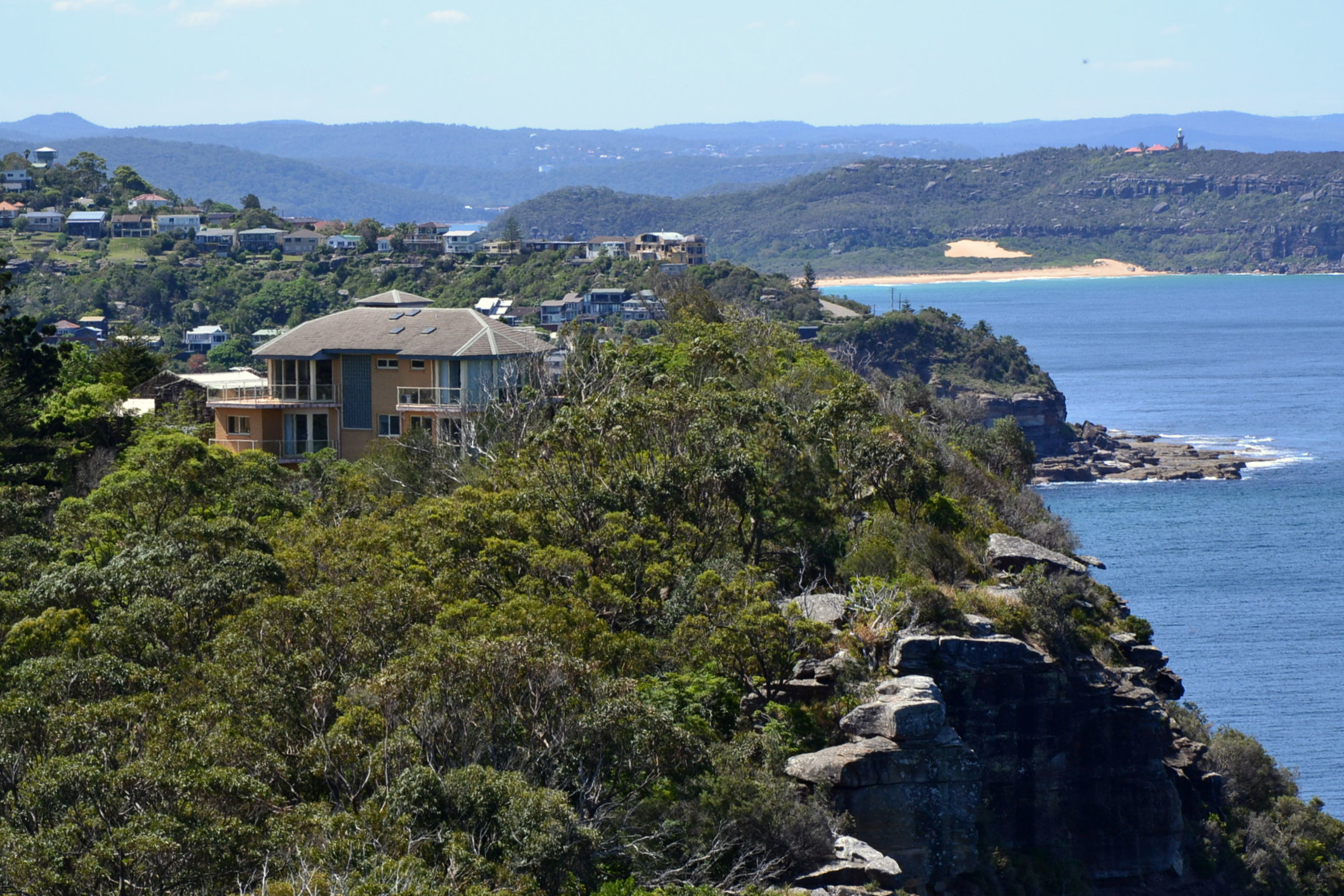
Careel Head

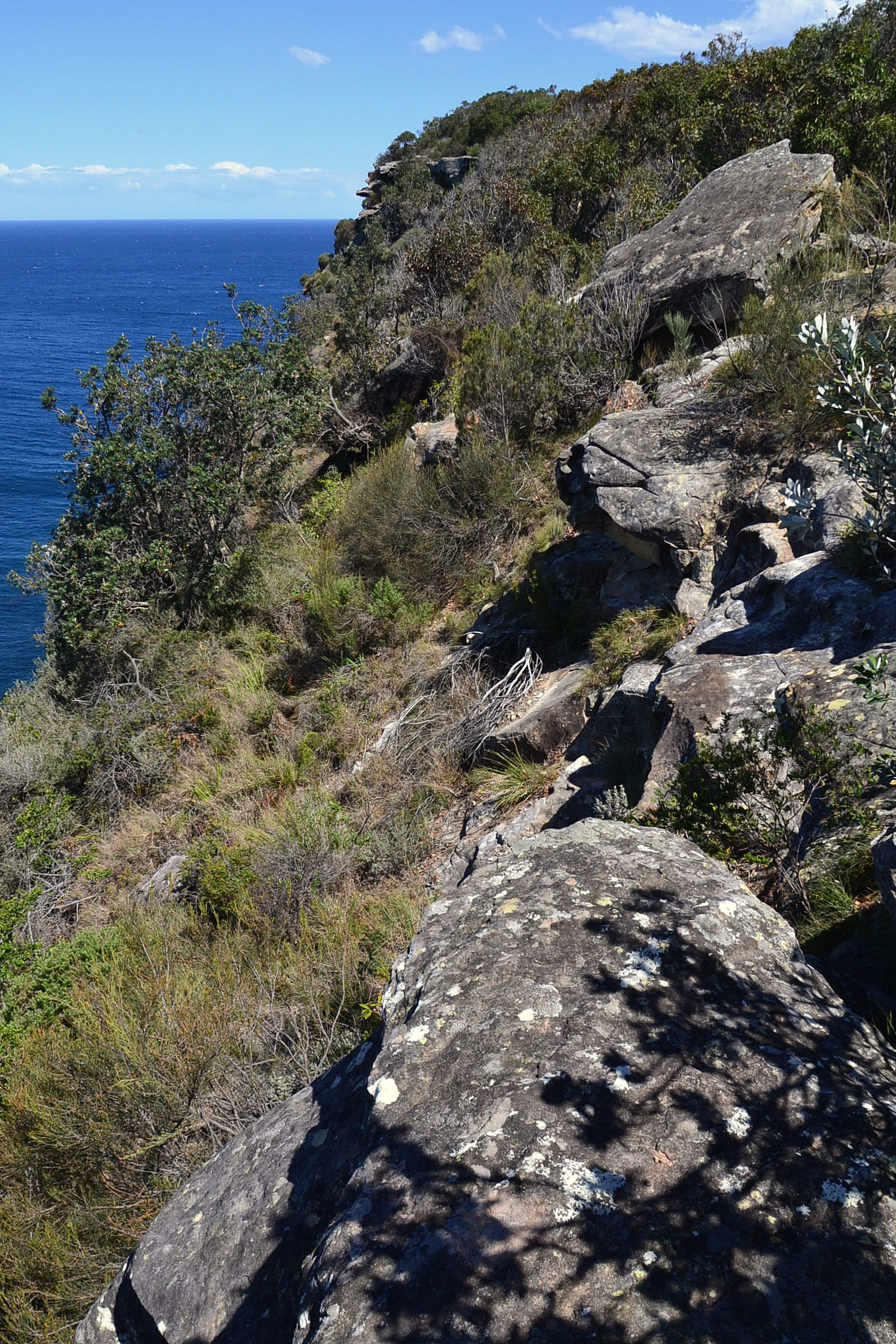
Bangalley Head

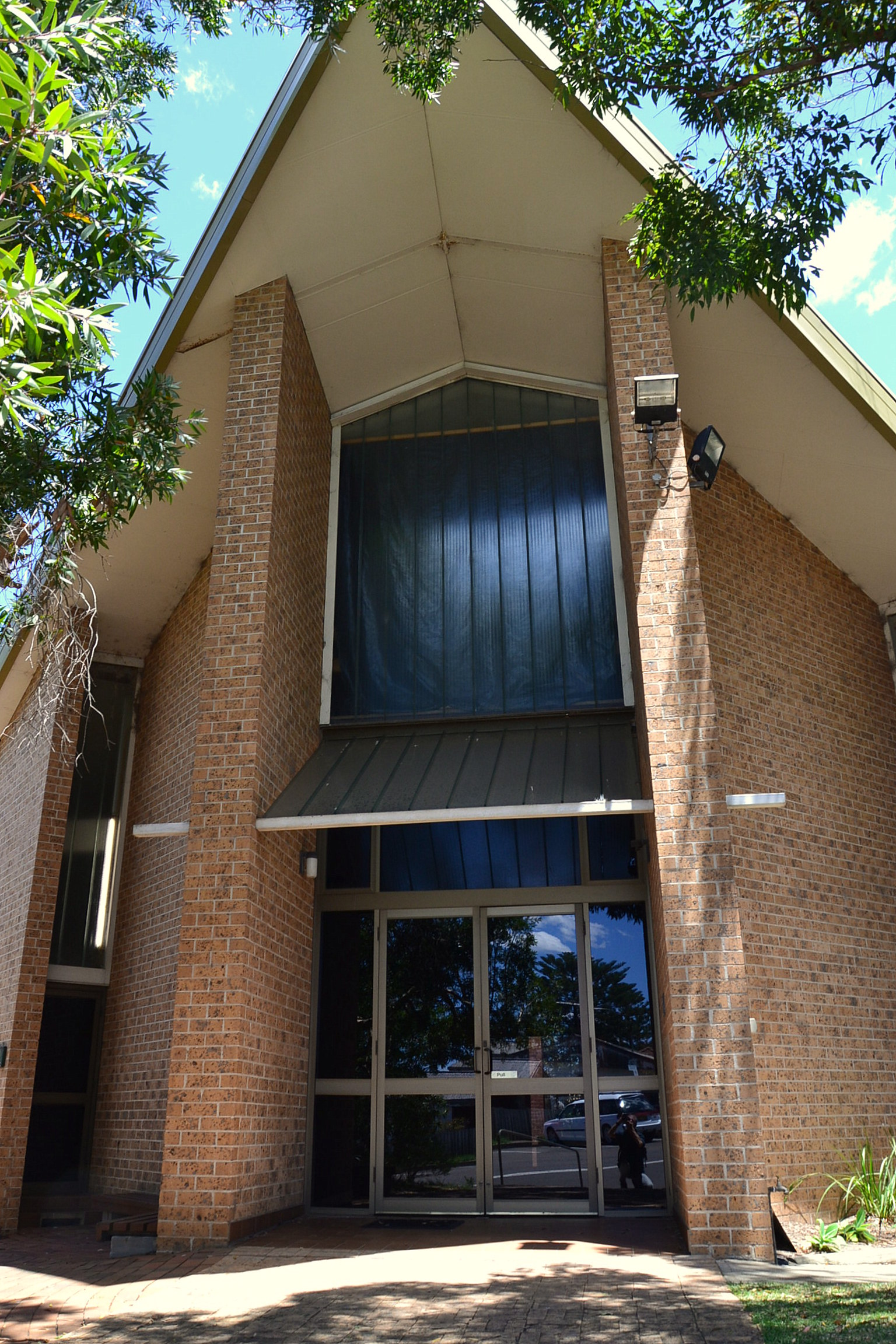
St Mark's Church

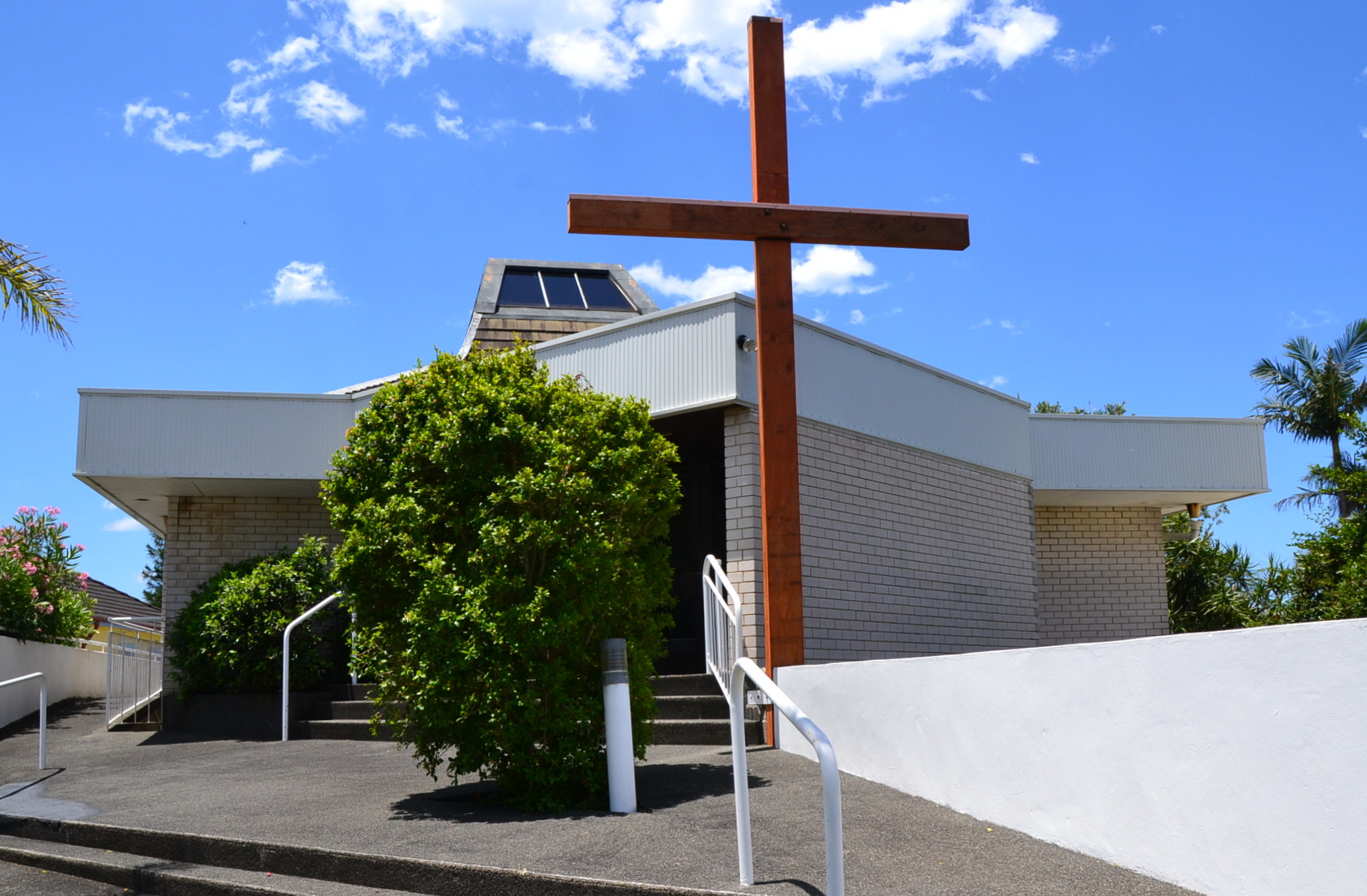
Baptist Church

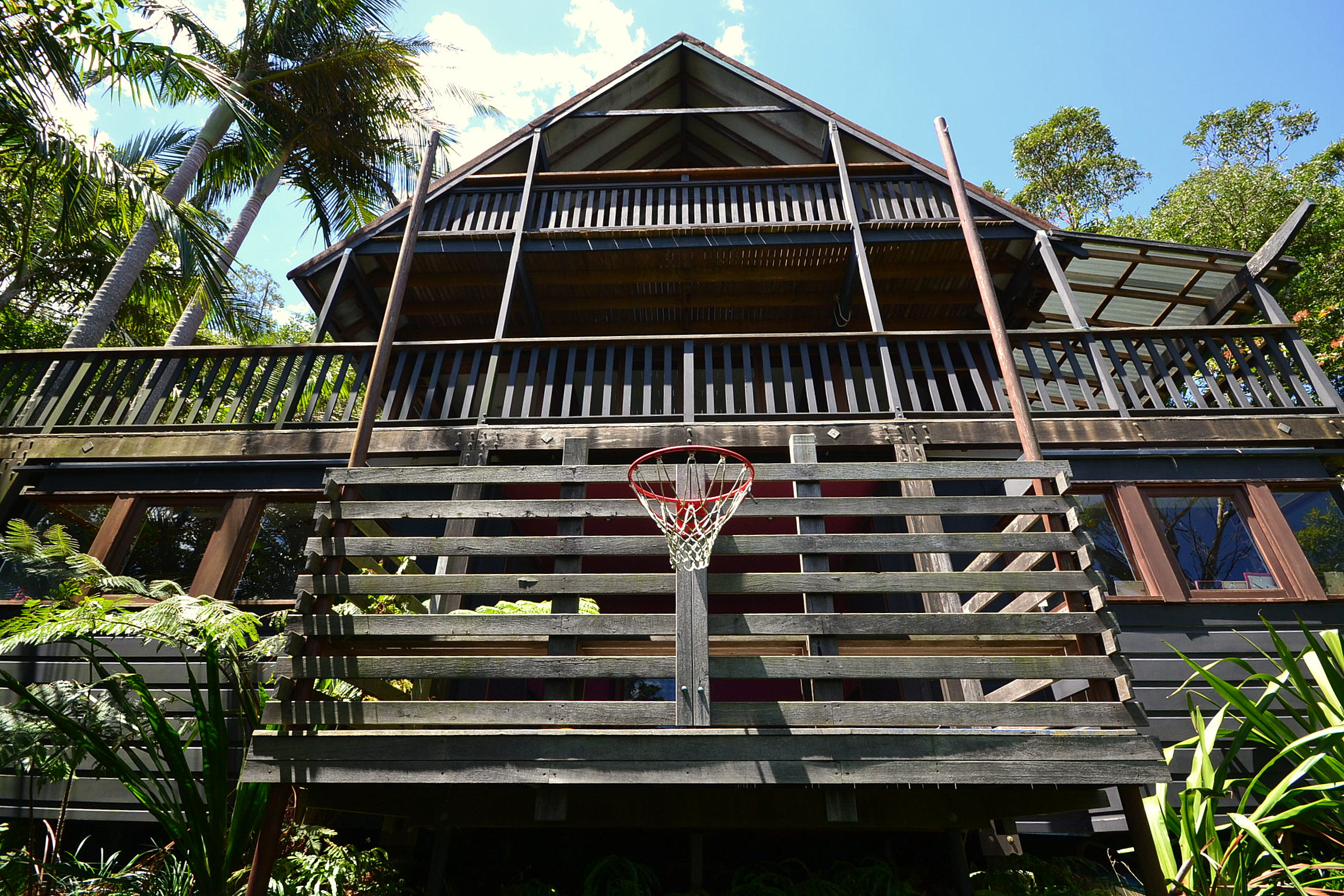
Home in Whale Beach Road designed to blend in with the bush

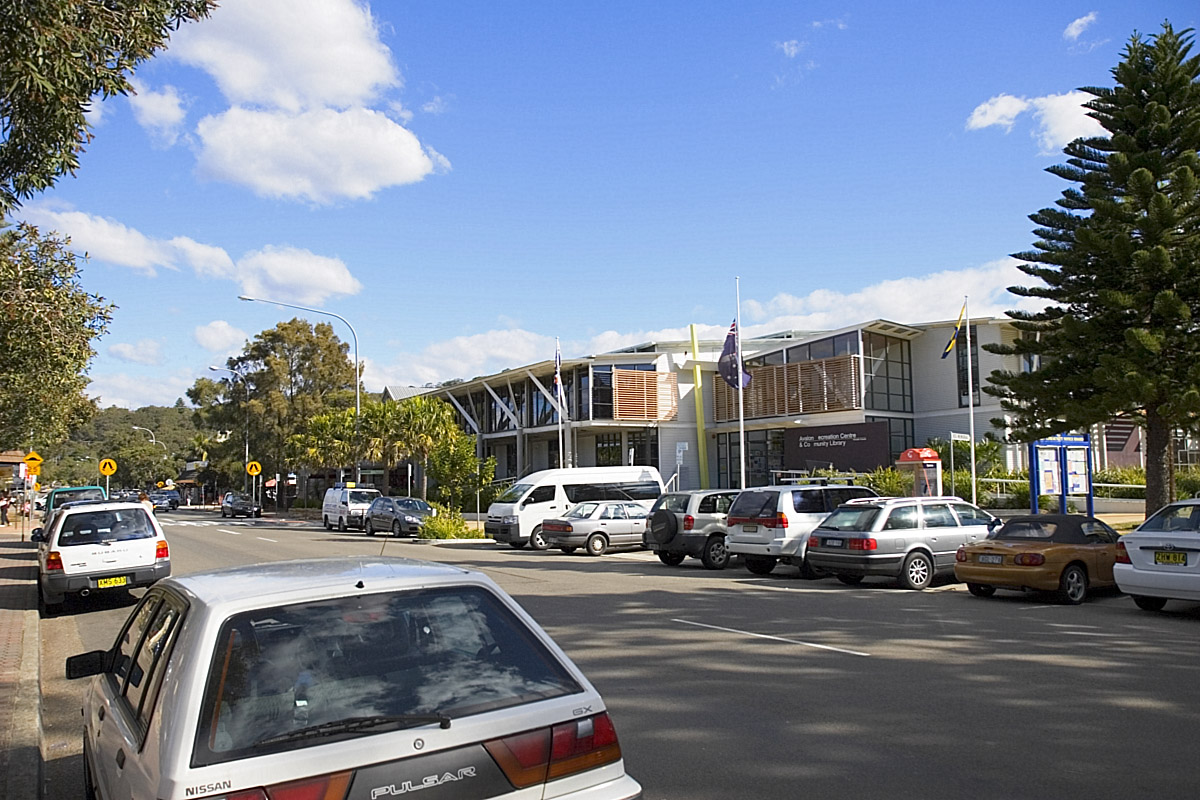
Avalon Beach town centre

== Notable residents ==
- Yahoo Serious (1953–), actor and director
- Mandy Zieren (1978–), competitive bodyboarder
