= Metropolitan Meat Platform railway station =

Former railway station in Sydney, Australia

Metropolitan Meat Platform

General information
- Other names: Metropolitan Meat Platforms; Metropolitan Meat Board Platform; Metropolitan Meats; Metro Meats
- Location: Sydney Olympic Park, New South Wales; Australia
- Coordinates: 33°51′02″S 151°04′12″E
- Operator: State Rail Authority
- Line: Abattoirs
- Distance: 16.780 km (10.427 mi) from Central

Construction
- Structure type: Ground

Other information
- Status: Demolished

History
- Opened: 11 January 1915 (111 years ago)
- Closed: 9 November 1984 (41 years ago)

Services
Preceding station	Former services	Following station
Brickworks towards Abattoirs	Abattoirs Line	Pippita towards Flemington or Auburn
Location

Metropolitan Meat Platform railway station was a suburban railway station located on the Abattoirs line, serving the former State Abattoirs in the modern Sydney suburb of Sydney Olympic Park.

== History ==
Metropolitan Meat Platform was opened on 11 January 1915, on the Abattoirs railway line which had originally opened in 1911.

The station was opened as a result of the formation of the Metropolitan Meat Industry Board of New South Wales. The board had been established as part of the "Meat Industry Act 1915", to oversee and control the slaughtering of cattle and inspect meat products. Metropolitan Meat Platform provided service for board members visiting the abattoirs.

Metropolitan Meat Platform itself was rarely included in suburban rail maps, but passenger services were provided and operated by CPH railmotors, until the line north of Pippita railway station closed on 9 November 1984 including the station.

As part of the construction of the Sydney Olympic Park for the 2000 Summer Olympics, the station was demolished and built over, with no remnants now extant. The Olympic Park railway line is built over sections of the former Abattoirs branch, both east and west of the former station.

=== Name ===
Throughout its existence, the station was referred to by a number of names, including:

- Metropolitan Meat Platform
- Metropolitan Meat Platforms
- Metropolitan Meat Board Platform
- Metropolitan Meats
- Metro Meats

== See also ==
- Olympic Park railway station, Sydney
