= Brickworks railway station =

Former railway station in New South Wales, Australia

Brickworks

General information
- Other names: Brick Works; State Brickworks; Brickworks Platform
- Location: Sydney Olympic Park; Sydney, New South Wales; Australia
- Coordinates: 33°50′23″S 151°04′31″E
- Operator: State Rail Authority
- Line: Abattoirs
- Distance: 18.406 km (11.437 mi) from Central
- Platforms: Unknown
- Tracks: 1 (in 1984)

Construction
- Structure type: Ground

Other information
- Status: Demolished

History
- Opened: December 1939 (86 years ago)
- Closed: c.1980s (c.45 years ago)

Services
Preceding station	Former services	Following station
Abattoirs Terminus	Abattoirs Line	Metropolitan Meat Platform towards Flemington or Auburn
Location

Brickworks railway station was a suburban railway station located on the Abattoirs line, serving the State Brickworks at Homebush Bay, in the modern Sydney suburb of Sydney Olympic Park. Initially built only for industrial purposes, the station subsequently received public passenger services until its closure in the early 1980s.

== History ==
Brickworks station was opened in December 1939, to serve the Sydney State Brickworks, which was responsible for the creation and transportation of bricks throughout Sydney and New South Wales. The State Brickworks itself had originally opened in 1911, but had been sold to private operators in 1936 before being closed, three years before the railway connection was constructed. The State Brickworks was then reopened in August 1946, with the Brickworks supplying over 250 million bricks within the state in the seven years after reopening. The role of the railway station and facilities at the State Brickworks was described by Jack Renshaw, the then Minister for Public Works in 1953:

"Special supervision is given at the State Works to the packing of country orders for delivery by rail, to ensure that the bricks arrive in good condition. Railway facilities at the yards minimise handling."

Most passenger services were through services running to Abattoirs from Lidcombe or Auburn, although in the 1950s a limited number of services terminated at Brickworks before reversing to Central via Flemington.

Sidings constructed near the station were also used to stable empty carriages such as red rattlers. On 14 January 1953, a C32 class locomotive overran a siding, and was turned onto its side. No one was injured. The Brickworks signal box located near the sidings, was destroyed by termites in 1984, one day after closure of the Abattoirs line.

Station facilities were minimal. After closure to public services, Brickworks was used for empty car runs, and people alighting at the station would do so directly onto the ground. The station served the State Brickworks until its closure in the early 1980s. By 1982, Brickworks was no longer served by any public passenger service, two years before the closure of the rest of the Abattoirs line.

The State Brickworks closed in 1988, and was demolished in order to redevelop the area into Sydney Olympic Park for the 2000 Summer Olympics. The area around the former station is now part of the Brickpit Ring Walk.
