= Homebush railway station =

Railway station in Sydney, New South Wales

Homebush
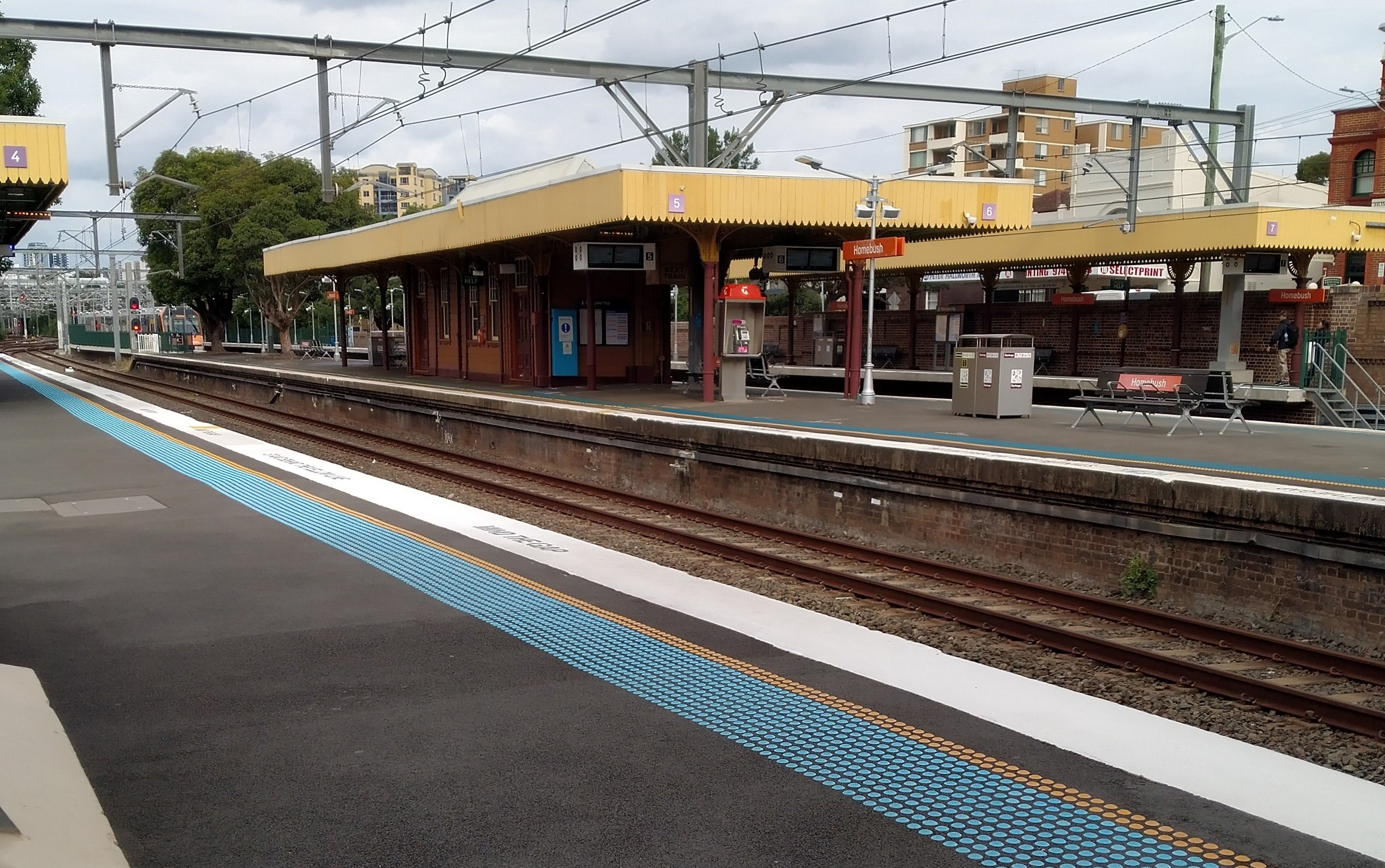
- View of the heritage-listed shelters from Platform 4 in April 2024

General information
- Location: The Crescent, Homebush; Sydney, New South Wales; Australia
- Coordinates: 33°52′01″S 151°05′11″E
- Owner: Transport Asset Manager of NSW
- Operator: Sydney Trains
- Line: Main Suburban
- Distance: 12.74 km (7.92 mi) from Central
- Platforms: 7 (3 island, 1 side)
- Tracks: 7
- Connections: Bus

Construction
- Structure type: Ground
- Accessible: Yes

Other information
- Status: Weekdays: Staffed: 6am to 7pm: Weekends and public holidays: Staffed: 8am to 4pm
- Station code: HSH
- Website: Transport for NSW

History
- Opened: 26 September 1855 (171 years ago)
- Electrified: Yes (from 1928)

Passengers
- 2025: 2,125,602 (year); 5,824 (daily) (Sydney Trains)
- Rank: 74

Services
Preceding station	Sydney Trains	Following station
Flemington towards Parramatta or Leppington	Leppington & Inner West Line	Strathfield towards City Circle
Flemington towards Liverpool	Liverpool & Inner West Line	Strathfield towards City Circle
Lidcombe towards Liverpool	Liverpool & Inner West Line Express (Weekdays only)	Strathfield towards City Circle
North Shore & Western Line does not stop here

New South Wales Heritage Register
- Official name: Homebush Railway Station group
- Type: State heritage (complex / group)
- Designated: 2 April 1999
- Reference no.: 1170
- Type: Railway Platform / Station
- Category: Transport – Rail
- Builders: NSW Government Railways
Location

Homebush railway station is a heritage-listed suburban railway station located on the Main Suburban line, serving the Sydney suburb of Homebush. It was designed and built by the New South Wales Government Railways and opened on 26 September 1855. The property was added to the New South Wales State Heritage Register on 2 April 1999.

The station is served by Sydney Trains T2 Leppington & Inner West and T3 Liverpool & Inner West Line services.

== History ==
The Main Western line to Parramatta, via Granville station was originally completed in 1855. The line opened on 26 September 1855 and was double track from Sydney Central to Newtown station and then single track to Parramatta (but duplicated in 1856). The line was built as a direct connection to Parramatta and, subsequently, for the purpose of connecting Sydney with the major rural railways that were constructed across the Blue Mountains to Bathurst and across the Southern Highlands to Goulburn via Liverpool. There were few stops along the line between Sydney and Parramatta and it was not the original intention of the line to serve suburban development. Changes to the line were more often related to the line's long distance purpose than to the communities along it.

The Homebush to Waratah railway line was opened in 1886 from Homebush to Hornsby, and subsequently further extended, eventually connecting to Waratah in 1889. This line (now the Main North line) initially had connections to both Homebush and Strathfield, but after 1892 the main line connected to Strathfield, and today only freight trains use the single track north from Homebush.

Traffic to the west and south (and later north) of the state brought the need to amplify the line, first in 1891 when it was quadrupled and later in 1927 when it was sextupled (to Homebush) and electrified. With both of these major changes the earlier stations were usually entirely demolished and replaced with a new station. The 1927 work completed this process with the complete replacement of Strathfield and much of Newtown Stations. During this time suburban development also extended west along the line and these new stations were thus specifically designed as full-scale suburban passenger stations rather than rural "halts". The Engineer for Existing Lines, George Cowdery (appointed 1863), was a particularly strong influence on the architecture of this line, building particularly elegant stations in the late 1880s ahead of the 1891 quadruplication, in addition to replacing the original stone arch viaduct at Lewisham with iron truss bridges. Sextuplication in 1927 brought less change to most local stations (which were on the southern side), the new tracks being express ones on the northern side.

Homebush station opened on 26 September 1855 when the Main Suburban line opened. In 1858, Homebush was the location of an accident involving NSW Railway's Locomotive No. 1, built by Robert Stephenson and Company, when the passenger train it was hauling left the rails and toppled down an embankment, killing two people.

In 1862 a new station building was erected on the southern side and in the 1870s stockyards were erected adjacent to the station (the stockyards serviced the Glebe Island NSW Government abattoirs). The stockyards were closed and replaced by Flemington stockyards in 1883.

In 1891, with quadruplication, Homebush station was completely rebuilt resulting in the present station layout being established with a centre island platform opening in late 1891. The station comprised large platform buildings, an overhead pedestrian footbridge with a booking office and an existing 1880s Station Master's Residence on the north side of the station. The station was expanded to six platforms when the line between Redfern and Homebush was sextupled in the 1920s.

The existing three-storey brick signal box was built in 1892 and remained in use until 1928 when its function was replaced by a new "power" box. The 1928 signal box remained in use until 1982 when it was replaced by a simple brick and concrete building. The 1892 signal box is now the only remaining box at the station of the five built since the station opened.

For many years Homebush was the terminating point for local suburban services on the Western line. A carriage shed was built at Homebush in 1890 located to the east of Homebush Road which connected to one of a number of sidings built at the station during this period. The carriage shed was later used as a store then training and education facilities until it was demolished in 2001.

In 1891 a locomotive depot and locomotive watering facilities were also constructed near the carriage shed. By the late 1920s the Depot was largely redundant and was ultimately demolished c. 1929.

Numerous smaller buildings were also constructed at Homebush such as a telephone exchange, storage sheds, amenities buildings and a track ganger's shed. All have been demolished.

The station also featured a Garden Nursery, a single storey building built in 1923 along the eastern frontage of The Crescent which was established so that other stations could be provided with a range of shrubs and flower plants to improve their landscaped appearance. Railway station gardens were created statewide from c.1890 onwards. Competitions and prizes sprang up and two nurseries (Homebush and Hamilton, near Newcastle) were opened to provide plants, in addition to those sourced from staff home gardens. Changing practices both in nursery supplies and the station gardens promotions saw the nursery close in 1974 and its staff of gardeners disbanded.

Due to increased goods train traffic, two lines were built on the north side of the station in 1924 converting the side platform into an island. The footbridge was also extended over the new tracks and a two-storey office built abutting the footbridge on its western side. These changes resulted in the demolition of the 1880 station master's Residence.

=== 1990s to date ===
In 1992 the steel footbridge was replaced by the present pre-cast concrete bridge having part replica steel lattice balustrades imitating the original wrought iron lattice girder design.

On 9 October 1994, a large fire destroyed the original heritage-listed buildings on platforms 3 and 4, they were later rebuilt as a similar awning structure. During the Sydney 2000 Olympics, the station was closed to avoid confusion with Olympic Park station, in the similarly named suburb of "Homebush Bay" but some distance away. Homebush Bay is no longer a suburb, with the majority of the area becoming the new suburb of Sydney Olympic Park in 2009 due to continuing confusion at Homebush station during major events.

Under the Rail Clearways Program, an additional platform (Platform 7) was built to the south, with tracks rearranged to create a turnback at platform 6. This turnback platform enabled all stations trains to be terminated clear of the running lines and create extra capacity between Homebush and Lidcombe station.

On 20 October 2013, a new timetable was introduced which saw Homebush become the terminus for local T2 Inner West & South line services to and from the city. Most trains continuing beyond Homebush did not stop at the station. As a result, the only way to travel west from Homebush was to travel one stop east to Strathfield to connect with trains continuing further west. Only a few weekday services connected with Flemington.

An accessibility upgrade, including lift access to the station, was announced in 2015.

In 2017, some local T2 Inner West & Leppington weekday trains were extended to Parramatta, finally allowing a connection to Flemington station.

After the Sydenham to Bankstown shutdown in 2024, T3 trains were rerouted local via Homebush, running at all time. This provided weekend local services west of Homebush for the first time.

=== Signalling ===
Rail traffic in the Homebush area has been controlled from the adjacent Strathfield signal box since 1983. From 1893 to 1928, a large mechanical signal box controlled traffic through Homebush. This building, situated to the south west of the station, opposite Homebush Public School, still stands. From 1928 to 1983, a pistol grip power box situated immediately to the west of platforms 1 and 2 was in use. It was damaged by fire and demolished, some time after its closure.

== Services ==
=== Platforms ===
Homebush station is the western terminus of local Inner West services on the T2 Leppington & Inner West Line, which originate from the City Circle, terminate at Platform 6 and then return to the City Circle. Through-services proceed west from here towards Parramatta or Leppington, and east towards Central and the City Circle.

Platform 1 does not physically exist on the station's numbering system. However, behind the existing Platform 2 is the North Strathfield Junction goods line, which previously had a platform face when the goods line was double track. The platform is now fenced off from the goods line.

Platform	Line	Stopping pattern	Notes
1		platform does not physically exist	
2		no scheduled services	
3		no scheduled services	
4	Leppington & Inner West Line	services to Central & the City Circle	
4	Liverpool & Inner West Line	services to Central & the City Circle	
5		no scheduled services	
6	Leppington & Inner West Line	terminating services to & from Central & the City Circle	
7	Leppington & Inner West Line	services to Parramatta & Leppington	
7	Liverpool & Inner West Line	services to Liverpool via Regents Park	

=== Transport links ===
Transit Systems operates one bus route via Homebush station, under contract to Transport for NSW:

- 408 Rookwood Cemetery to Westfield Burwood via Flemington and Strathfield

Homebush station is served by two NightRide routes:

- N60 Fairfield station to Town Hall station
- N61 Carlingford station to Town Hall station

== Heritage listing ==
As at 26 October 2010, Homebush Railway Station has state significance as the site of three different railway stations that represent three significant historical phases in the development of the NSW railways. The site is significant as one of only four original intermediate stations on the first railway line in NSW between Sydney and Parramatta; the subsequent rebuilding of the station in the 1860s was associated with servicing the nearby Government Abattoirs at Homebush; and the existing station arrangement dating from the 1891 quadruplication of the line represents the expansion of the railways in the late 19th century to accommodate increasing rail services.

Homebush Railway Station is significant for its rare collection of railway structures dating from 1891 that form a unique and cohesive group. Designed under the direction of Commissioner Edward Eddy, the platform buildings demonstrate the first use of island platforms in NSW and are one of only four extant examples of 1891 "Standard Eddy" platform buildings. The 1891 overhead booking office is also a rare structure being one of only three similar structures representing the earliest use of above-platform buildings. The station buildings including the signal box, brick store rooms and footbridge collectively demonstrate a former era of travel, communication and trade. The group remains highly intact.

Homebush railway station was listed on the New South Wales State Heritage Register on 2 April 1999 having satisfied the following criteria.

The place is important in demonstrating the course, or pattern, of cultural or natural history in New South Wales.

Homebush Railway Station Group has historical significance at the state level representing three significant historical phases in the development of the NSW railways. Established during the first phase of NSW railway construction in the 1850s the site is significant as one of only four original intermediate stations on the first railway line in NSW between Sydney and Parramatta. The subsequent (second) rebuilding of the station in the 1860s was associated with servicing the nearby Government Abattoirs at Homebush. The existing (third) station arrangement with its extant platforms, station buildings and signal box dates from the 1891 quadruplication of the line represents the expansion of the railways in the late 19th century to accommodate increasing rail services. The existing 1890s platform buildings are historically significant as they are able to demonstrate the first use of island platforms in NSW. In addition the signal box, footbridge and brick store rooms collectively demonstrate a former era of travel, communication and trade.

The place has a strong or special association with a person, or group of persons, of importance of cultural or natural history of New South Wales's history.

The signal box and remaining contemporary railway buildings at Homebush railway station are closely identified with Commissioner Edward Eddy under whose direction the Homebush Railway station and signal box were designed, the station buildings being the first of the new standard type of station buildings.

The place is important in demonstrating aesthetic characteristics and/or a high degree of creative or technical achievement in New South Wales.

As a group the form, fabric and detailing of the Homebush station buildings characterise the type of construction and architectural style employed in late 19th century railway station buildings in the Sydney region. The 1890s "Standard Eddy" platform buildings all the characteristic features of this type of station building, namely cantilevered awnings with wide fascia and most importantly the purpose-designed location on island platforms. The 1890s overhead booking office is aesthetically significant as it has characteristic features of this type of station building namely the use of brick for construction, the small size of the building and the location of the building on the footbridge. The 1890s signal box is an in-operational signal box, with no signalling equipment and deteriorated interiors but it retains a number of features which typify this type of signal box, including inverted corrugated galvanised iron awnings above the operating level windows and landing and the full building width second floor landing which has a small timber compartment for a toilet at its rear.

The place has a strong or special association with a particular community or cultural group in New South Wales for social, cultural or spiritual reasons.

The place has the potential to contribute to the local community's sense of place and can provide a connection to the local community's history.

The place has potential to yield information that will contribute to an understanding of the cultural or natural history of New South Wales.

Homebush Railway Station has low archaeological research potential. Any evidence pertaining to the former station master's residence, the 1890s carriage shed, locomotive depot, locomotive watering facilities, and the 1923 nursery has been removed or disturbed by subsequent developments on site. The 1920s telephone exchange building has also been demolished and the site on which it existed has been levelled and planted with vegetation.

The place possesses uncommon, rare or endangered aspects of the cultural or natural history of New South Wales.

Homebush Railway Station is significant for its rare collection of railway structures dating from 1891. Homebush Railway Station is one of the four known stations including Croydon, Katoomba and Summer Hill which have extant "Standard Eddy" platform buildings. The 1891 overhead booking office is also a rare structure being one of only three known examples of similar pre1910 overhead booking offices in the state, the others being at Newtown and Redfern.

The place is important in demonstrating the principal characteristics of a class of cultural or natural places/environments in New South Wales.

The platform buildings at Homebush Station are in a largely intact condition externally and they are good representations of the "Standard Eddy" building.

The Homebush signal box is still able externally to demonstrate the essential design qualities of a late 19th-century elevated signal box of the NSW Government Railways. The design was widely used throughout the system from 1883 until 1911, and some twenty boxes of either full timber or mostly brick load-bearing wall construction were built.

== See also ==
- List of railway stations in Sydney
