= Pippita railway station =

Former railway station in Sydney, Australia

Pippita
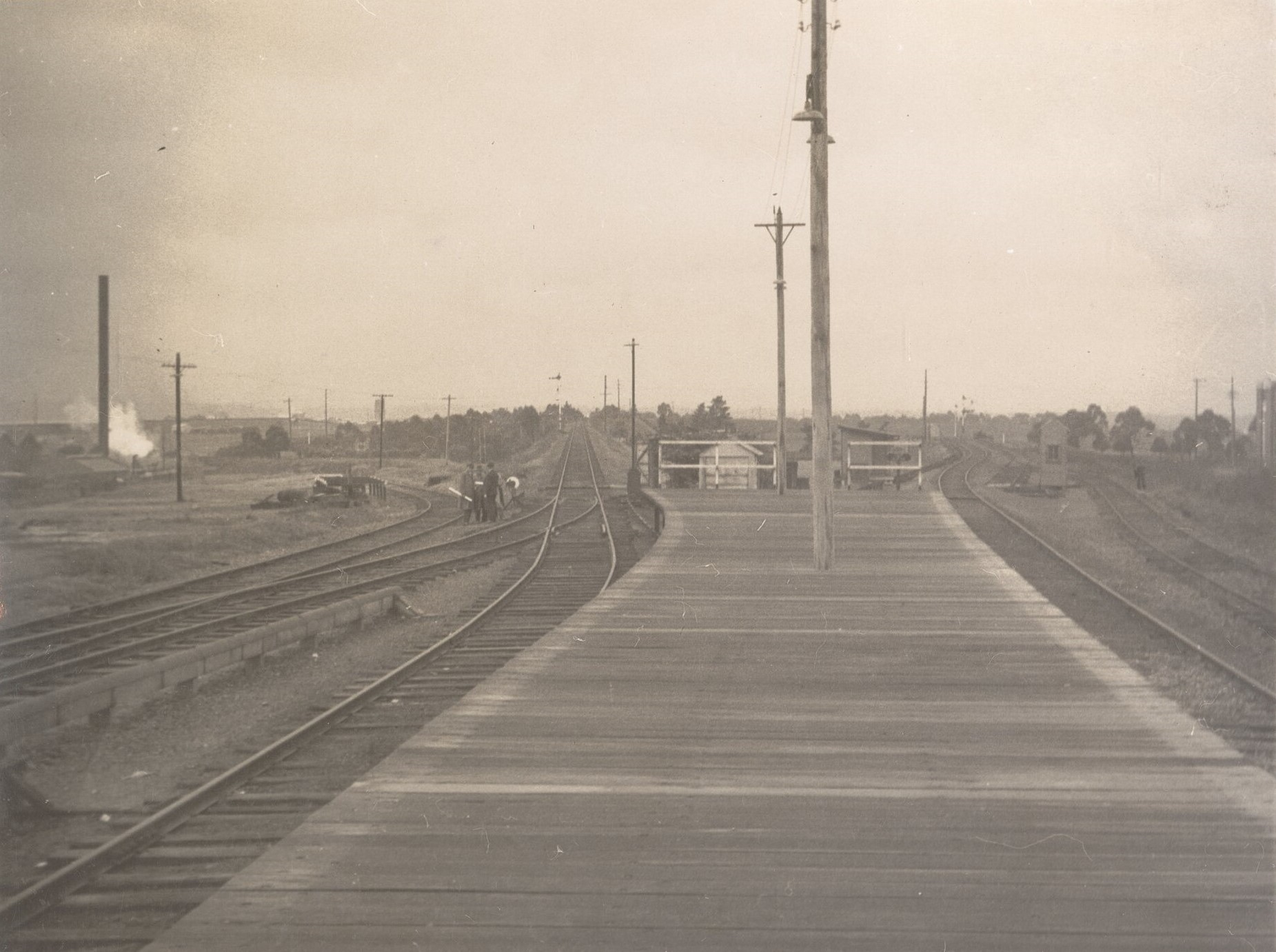
- Northbound view from the basic platform in April 1943

General information
- Location: Near Pippita Street, Lidcombe; Australia
- Coordinates: 33°51′32″S 151°03′42″E
- Operator: CityRail
- Line: Abattoirs
- Distance: 15.59 kilometres (9.69 mi) from Central
- Platforms: 2 (1 island)
- Tracks: 2

Construction
- Structure type: Ground

Other information
- Status: Demolished

History
- Opened: 4 October 1940
- Closed: 20 October 1995

Services
Preceding station	Former services	Following station
Metropolitan Meat Platform towards Abattoirs	Abattoirs Line	Flemington Terminus
Metropolitan Meat Platform towards Abattoirs	Abattoirs Line	Lidcombe Terminus
Closed Sydney stations
Location

Pippita railway station was a railway station on the former Abattoirs line in Sydney, New South Wales. The station opened on 4 October 1940 and closed on 20 October 1995. The Olympic Park line, which extends over the former Abattoirs branch, connects to the network on the Main South line at the site of the former station.

== History ==
Passenger services on the Abattoirs line were operated by CPH railmotors operating from Sandown via Lidcombe until November 1984. After this, Pippita (now as the terminus) was served by single-deck suburban electric trains known as "Red Rattlers". Pippita continued to be served by a sole daily service to Central until 20 October 1995, operated in its later days by a V set.

Pippita station served the Commonwealth Aircraft Corporation factory located in Lidcombe. Access the site of the former station was restricted following the Auburn Council sale of Pippita Street to Dairy Farmers.

Since 2015, community groups such as the Sydney Alliance, EcoTransit Sydney, and Restore Inner West Line proposed the reconstruction of Pippita station as part of a new express service between Lidcombe and Central.

Cumberland Council has received NSW Government funding for an active transport link known as Pippita Rail Trail with the former railway station to be marked with a historical image wall.

== See also ==
- Sydney Olympic Park
- List of closed Sydney railway stations
