= Brickpit Ring Walk =

Park in Sydney, Australia

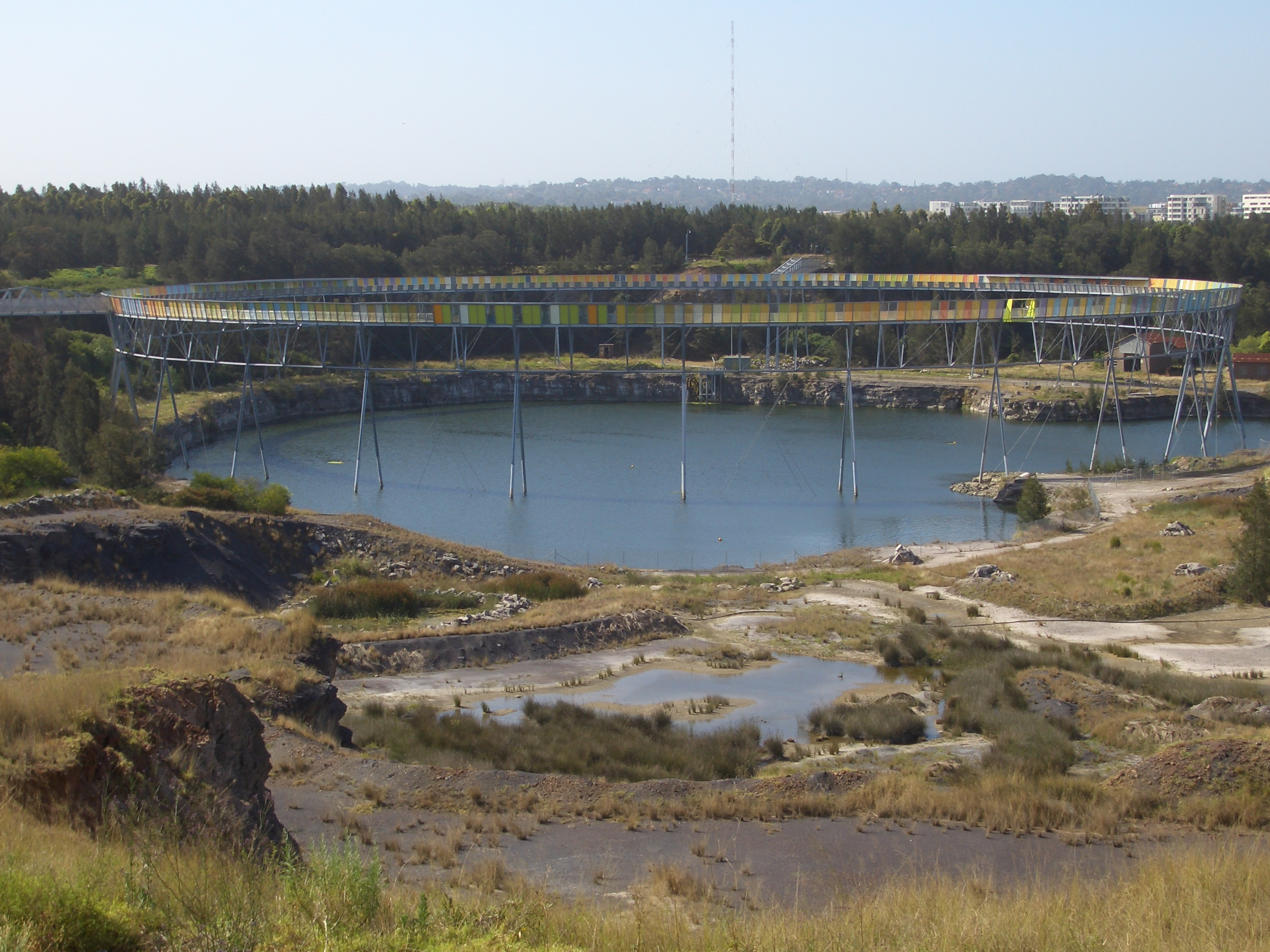
- Homebush Bay Brickpit, with the elevated Brickpit Ring Walk

- Location within Sydney
- Type: Urban nature park and walkway
- Location: Bicentennial Park, Sydney Olympic Park, Sydney, New South Wales, Australia
- Coordinates: 33°50′30″S 151°4′17″E
- Elevation: 18.5 metres (61 ft) above the brickpit floor
- Opened: 2005
- Designer: Durbach Block Architects
- Owner: Sydney Olympic Park Authority
- Awards: National Trust Heritage Award 2006; RAIA Special Jury Award 2006; Venice Biennale (feature) 2006; RAIA (NSW) Lloyd Rees Civic Award 2006
- Paths: 550-metre (1,804 ft) elevated walkway
- Species: Green and Golden Bell Frog (Litoria aurea)
- Parking: off Marjorie Jackson Parkway
- Public transit: Olympic Park station; Olympic Park ferry wharf; Olympic Park bus routes (1–8); Homebush Bay Drive (A3); In development: Parramatta Light Rail; Sydney Metro West
- Website: Brickpit Ring Walk at SOPA

The Brickpit Ring Walk is an urban nature park and walkway that serves as a water storage and frog habitat in the Bicentennial Park, in Sydney Olympic Park, New South Wales, Australia. Once a brick manufacturing site, the land was to be redeveloped as part of the site for the 2000 Sydney Olympic and Paralympic Games, however the 1992 discovery of the then endangered Green and Golden Bell Frog (Litoria aurea) placed a hold on developments. The urban nature park and walkway was established in 2006.

== History ==
The site of the Brickpit Ring Walk is on the traditional lands of the Wann clan, known as the Wann-gal. Physical evidence of the usage of the Homebush Bay area by Aboriginal people has been found in the form of stone artefacts located nearby. Aboriginal shell middens (campsites where shellfish and other foods were consumed) were known to have lined Homebush Bay and the Parramatta River but were destroyed in the limekilns in the eighteenth and nineteenth century and subsequent alterations to the shoreline.

=== State Brickworks ===
Following a New South Wales Government inquiry into the monopolistic control of brickyards by the Metropolitan Brick Company, in 1911 the NSW Minister for Public Works resumed 9.5 hectares (23 acres) of Crown land from the adjacent State Abattoir for the State Brickworks, and by 1925 the site comprised 23.5 hectares (58 acres). There were difficulties in constructing the first kiln at the Brickworks, caused by the refusal of private manufacturers to sell their bricks for this purpose. Bricks made during the early years of the site were transported by barge to a depot in Blackwattle Bay from where they were loaded for road transport to building sites. Trading operations of the state-owned State Brickworks commenced on 1 November 1911 and the output for the first trading period was wholly absorbed on Government works. During the economic depression of the 1930s, the brickworks operated at a significant loss. In 1936, they were sold to private enterprise and closed in 1940. A train station for workers to use opened on the site in December 1939.

After World War II, the Government re-established the State Brickworks due to a shortage of bricks. Reformulated in 1946 as an agency within the NSW Department of Public Works, two large pits were created to provide the clay to make the bricks and the bricks were also shipped to country areas of New South Wales as the State Brickworks grew to acquire seven percent of the brick market in New South Wales. The State Brickworks acquired 81 hectares (200 acres) used by the State Timberworks at Blacktown and built new facilities on this site. The first pit was closed and filled in during the 1960s. In 1988, the NSW Government announced plans to close the operations at Homebush and to sell the Blacktown site as a going concern.

=== Popular culture ===
During the 1960–80s the Brickworks was known as "Brickies" a popular place for drag racing on a Friday or Saturday night. Drivers set off from the Big Chiefs (Beefy's) burger joint on Parramatta Road, racing up Underwood Road towards Brickies Hill. This circuit can be seen in the 1977 film The FJ Holden. The Brickworks was also used as a filming location for Bartertown scenes in Mad Max Beyond Thunderdome.

== Brickpit Ring Walk ==
Following cessation of quarrying, the Brickpit developed in a freshwater wetland. In 1992 approximately 300 (then) endangered Green and golden bell frogs were located in the wetlands as part of an Environmental Impact Statement for the 2000 Sydney Olympic and Paralympic Games. The site was proposed to be redeveloped as a tennis centre; however was halted on discovery of the frogs.

The remaining brick pit is now an adopted home of the Green and Golden Bell Frog. Above the brickpit is the Brickpit Ring Walk, a 550-metre (1,804 ft) elevated walkway and outdoor exhibition, sited 18.5 metres (61 ft) above the brickpit floor. The walkway allows visitors to view the nature park, water storage facility, and frog habitat without causing damage to the Green and Golden Bell Frog. Designed by Durbach Block Architects in 2005, in 2006 the walkway was featured in the Venice Biennale, and won the RAIA (NSW) Lloyd Rees Civic Design Award, the ASI Architectural & Engineering Innovation Steel Design Award (NSW), and the National Trust Heritage Award.

== Gallery ==
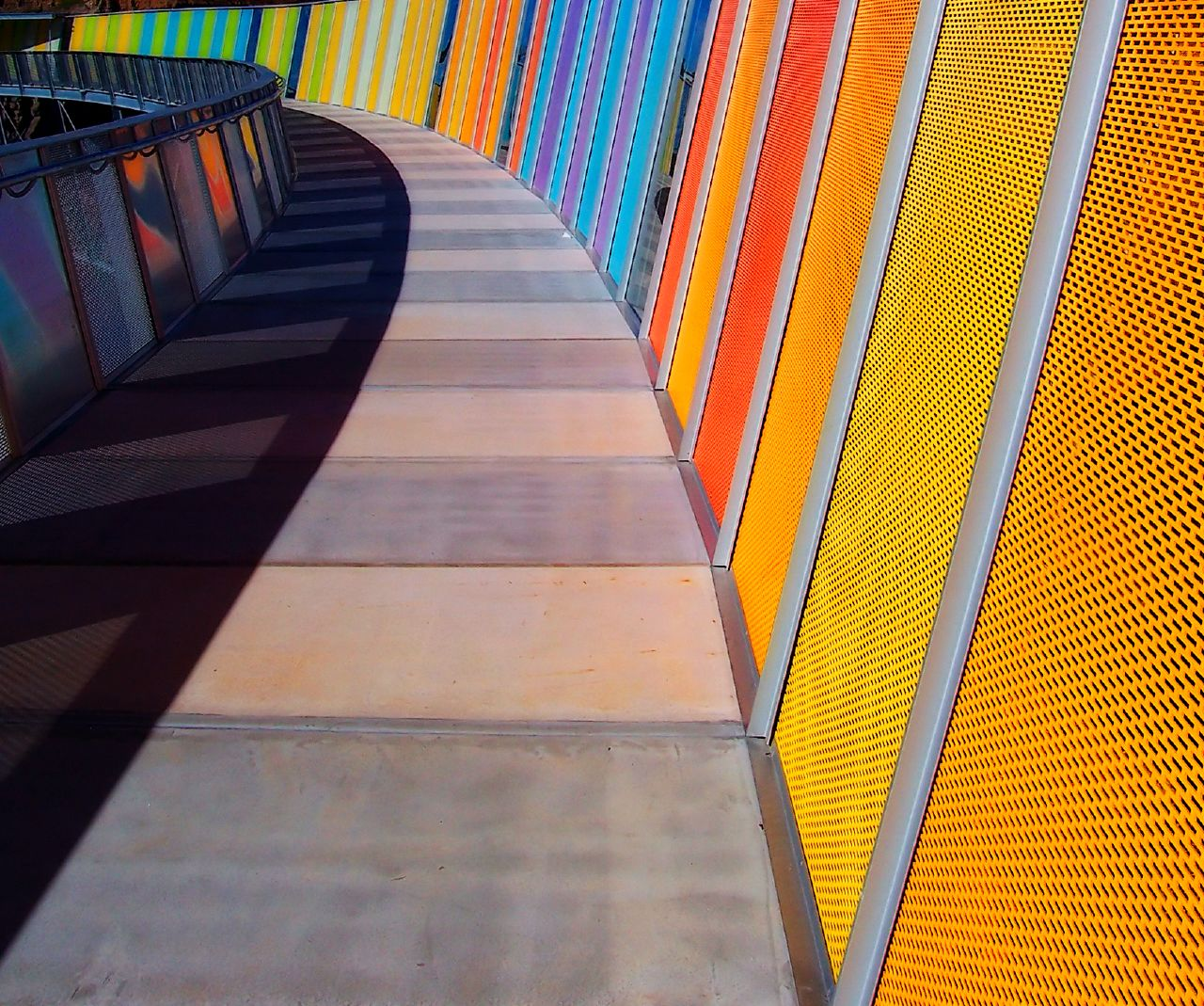
Brickpit Ring Walk, Bicentennial Park

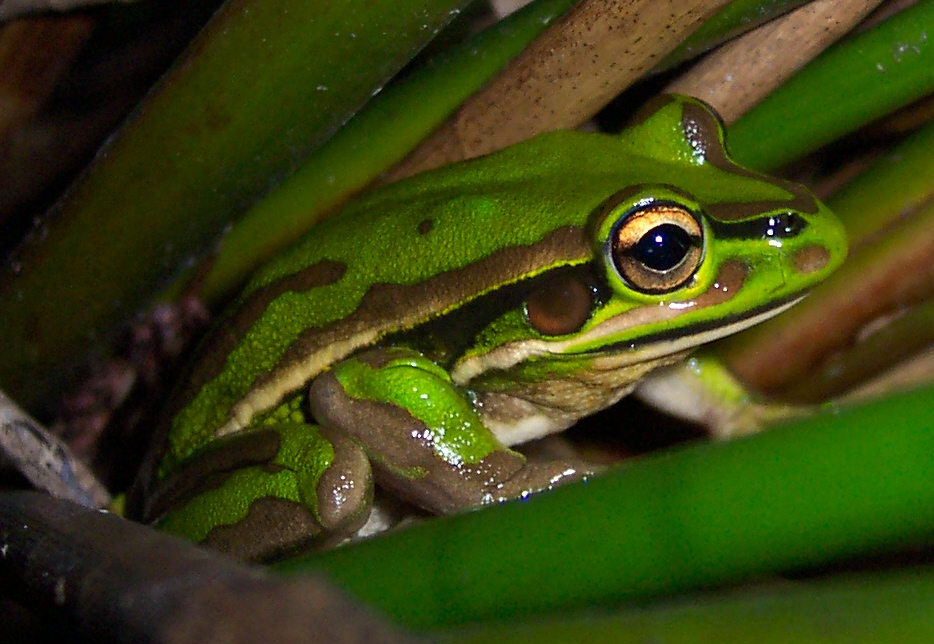
Litoria aurea (Green and Golden Bell Frog)

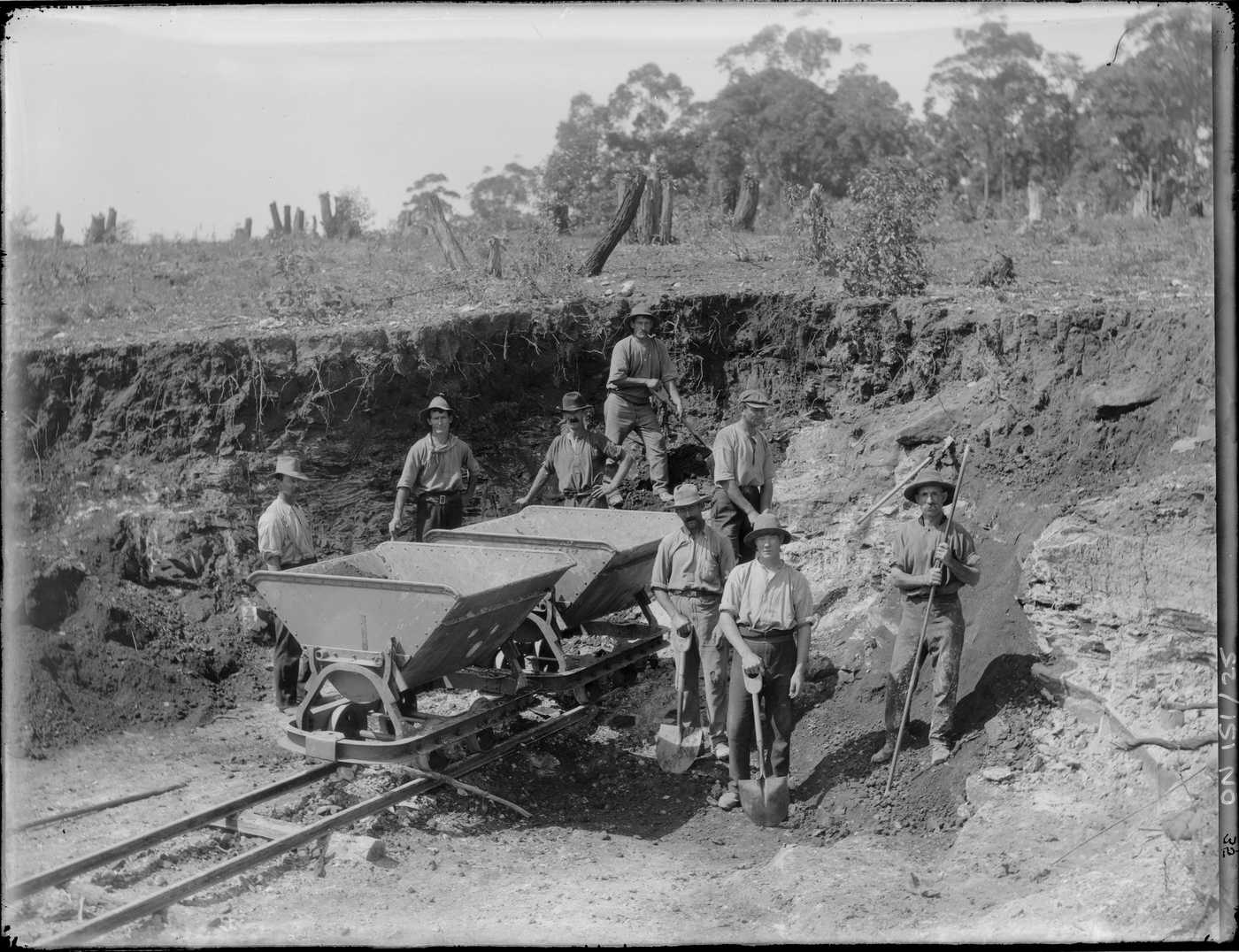
State Brickworks, Homebush in 1911

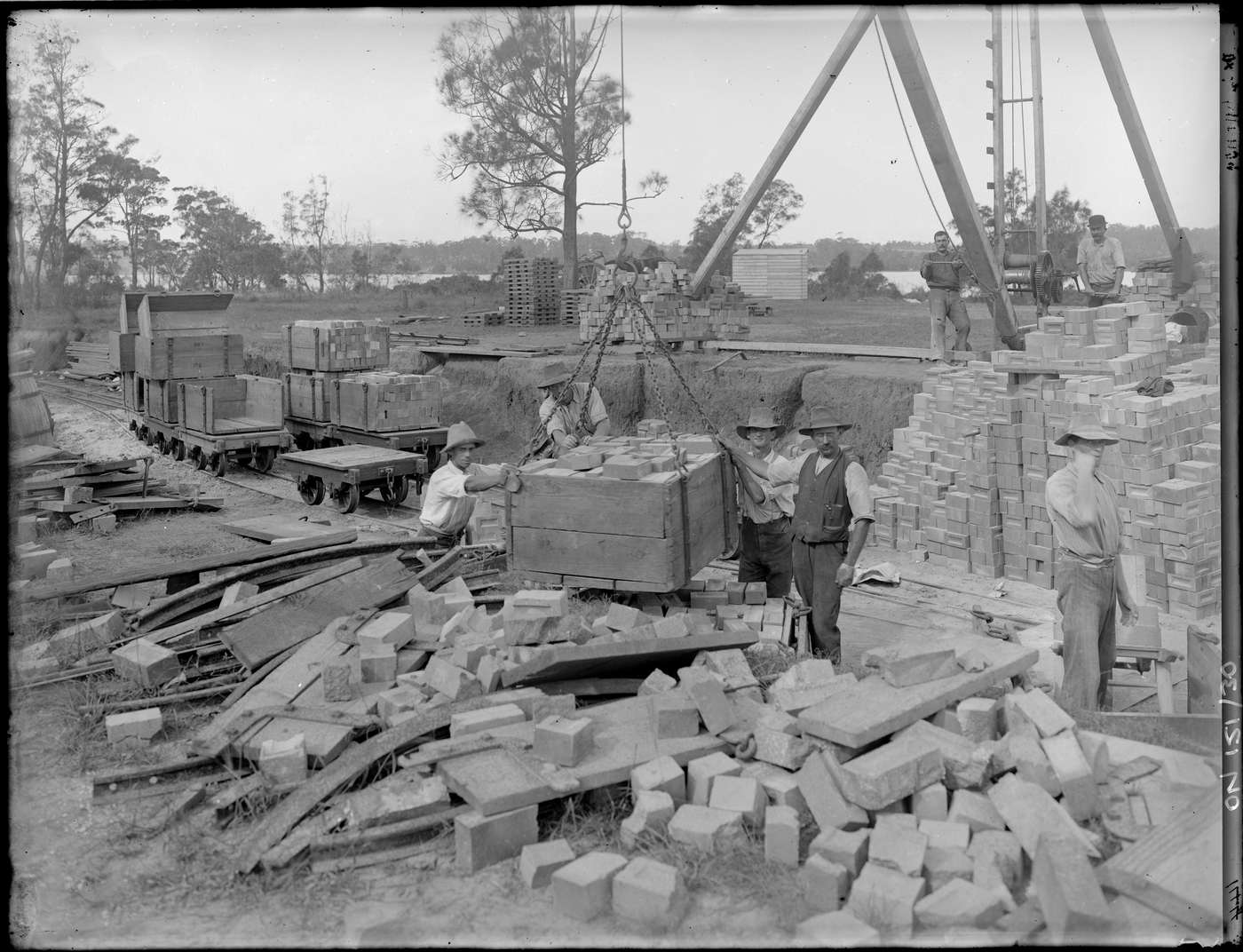
Workers at State Brickworks, Homebush in 1911

== See also ==
- Parks in Sydney
