= Sydney Olympic Park bus routes =

Special event bus routes in Sydney, Australia

1 – 8
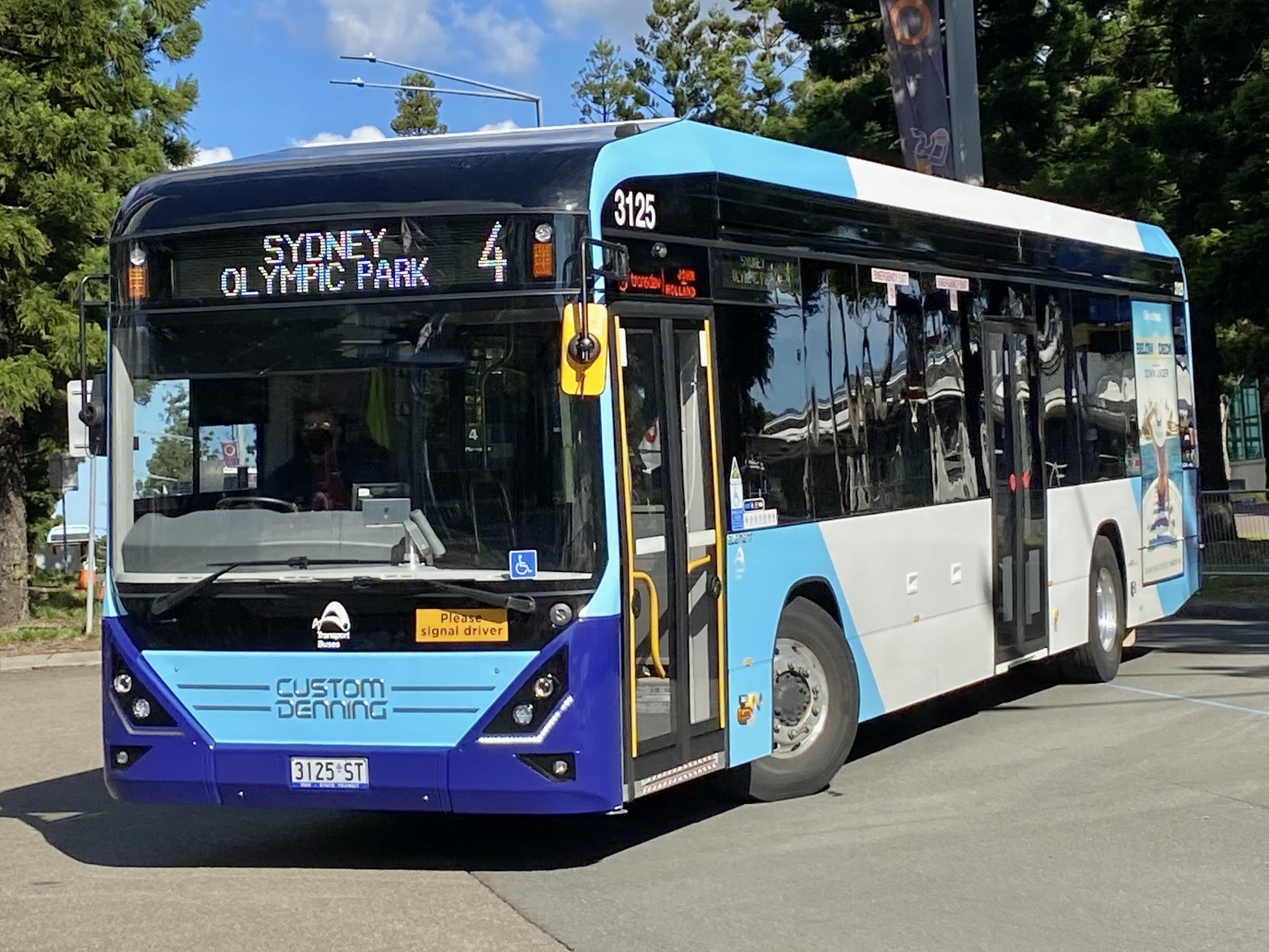
- Transdev John Holland bus on route 4 in June 2022

Overview
- Operator: Busways; CDC NSW; Keolis Downer Northern Beaches; Transdev John Holland; U-Go Mobility

Route
- Start: Warriewood; Glebe; Maroubra; Castle Hill; Rouse Hill; Menai; Cronulla; Dural
- End: Sydney Olympic Park

The Sydney Olympic Park bus routes are a network of special event bus routes designed to transport passengers to the Sydney Olympic Park suburb of Sydney, Australia during major events.

== History ==
During the planning of the 2000 Summer Olympics, the Government of New South Wales committed to a public transport-only strategy for the games. To discourage private vehicle use, the city provided minimal parking at competition venues and focused on the development of a new transit hub and the Olympic Park railway line. To address areas of the city that remained without access to public transportation after these additions, a dedicated network of bus routes was developed and commenced operation in 1998 to coincide with the relocation of the Sydney Royal Easter Show from Moore Park to the new Olympic venue.

The bus routes are activated for major events as designated by the state government, including:

- the Sydney Royal Easter Show
- State of Origin series matches
- the NRL Grand Final

== Routes ==
As of July 2025, the major event bus routes are:

Route	via	Operator
1A	Narrabeen, Collaroy, Dee Why, Beacon Hill, Forestville, Roseville, Chatswood West, North Ryde, and Top Ryde	Keolis Downer Northern Beaches
1B	Warriewood, Mona Vale, Terrey Hills, St Ives, West Pymble, Macquarie Park, and Top Ryde	CDC NSW
2	Glebe, Rozelle, Drummoyne, Hunters Hill, Gladesville, Putney, and Rhodes	Busways
4	Maroubra, Eastgardens, Mascot, Brighton-Le-Sands, Bexley, Campsie, and Strathfield South	Transdev John Holland
5A	Hills Showground, Castle Hill, Baulkham Hills, and Northmead	CDC NSW
5B	Tallawong, Rouse Hill, Bella Vista, Norwest, Baulkham Hills, and Northmead	CDC NSW
6	Sutherland, Menai, Bangor, Padstow, Bankstown, Yagoona, and Chullora	U-Go Mobility
7	Cronulla, Miranda, Sylvania, Hurstville, and Greenacre	U-Go Mobility
8	Dural, Cherrybrook, Carlingford, Pennant Hills, Telopea, and Ermington	CDC NSW

Route 3 ran to Macquarie Park via Ryde until 2014.
