= Strathfield railway station =

Railway station in Sydney, New South Wales, Australia

Strathfield
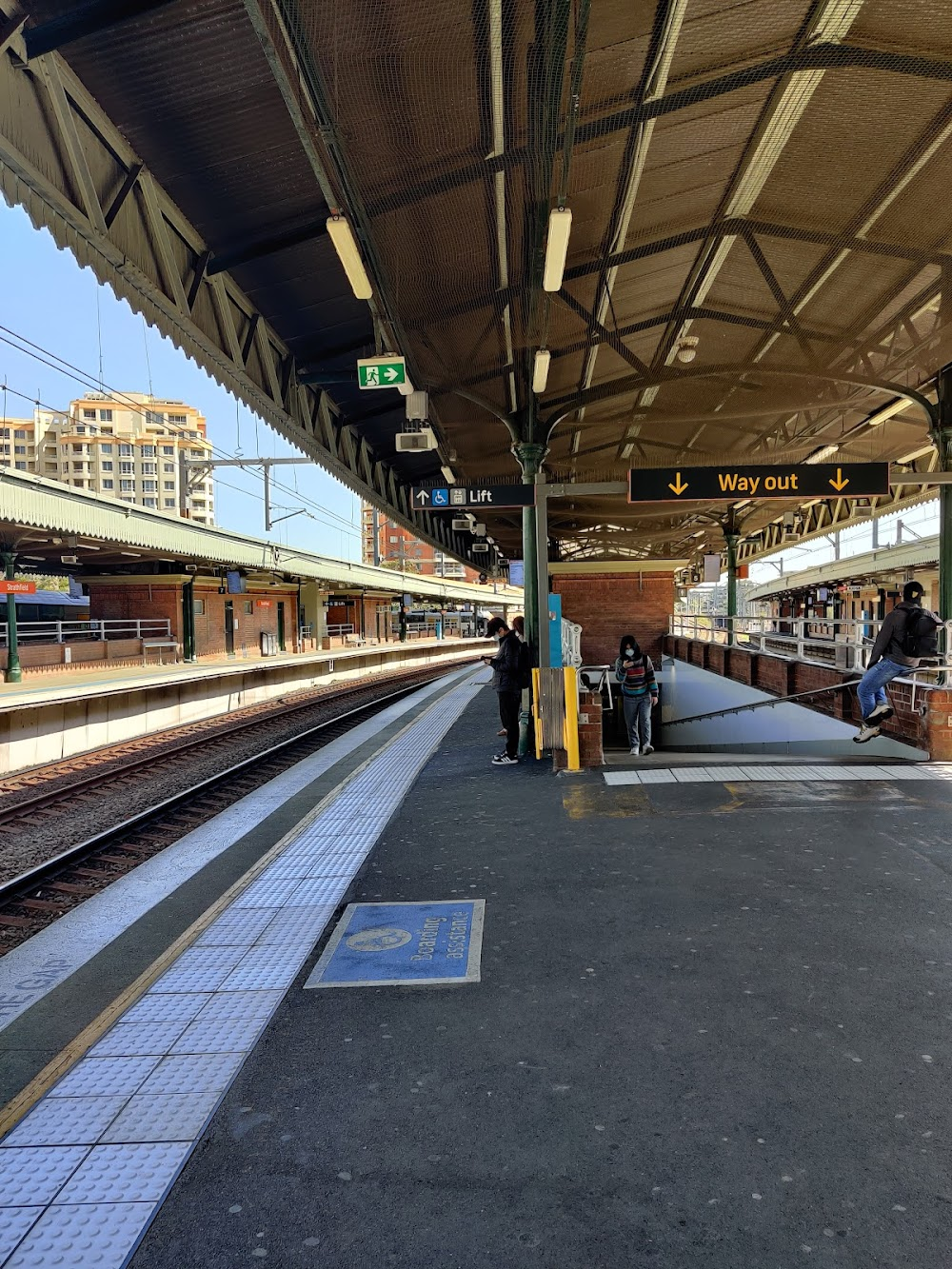
- Westbound view from Platform 6 in October 2025

General information
- Location: Albert Road, Strathfield; Sydney, New South Wales; Australia
- Coordinates: 33°52′18″S 151°05′40″E
- Owner: Transport Asset Manager of NSW
- Operator: Sydney Trains
- Lines: Main Suburban; Main Northern
- Distance: 11.81 km (7.34 mi) from Central
- Platforms: 8 (4 island)
- Tracks: 8
- Connections: Bus

Construction
- Structure type: Ground
- Accessible: Yes

Other information
- Status: Staffed
- Station code: STR
- Website: Transport for NSW

History
- Opened: 9 July 1876 (150 years ago)
- Electrified: Yes (from 1928)
- Former names: Redmyre (1876–1885)

Passengers
- 2025: 14,032,220 (year); 38,444 (daily) (Sydney Trains)
- Rank: 8

Services
Preceding station	Sydney Trains	Following station
Lidcombe towards Emu Plains or Richmond	North Shore & Western Line	Redfern towards Berowra
Parramatta towards Emu Plains or Richmond	North Shore & Western Line Weekday peak only	Redfern towards Berowra
Lidcombe One-way operation	North Shore & Western Line	Burwood (one weekday morning peak service) towards Berowra
Homebush towards Parramatta or Leppington	Leppington & Inner West Line	Burwood towards City Circle
Flemington towards Leppington	Leppington & Inner West Line	Burwood towards City Circle
Homebush towards Liverpool	Liverpool & Inner West Line	Burwood towards City Circle
Olympic Park Terminus	Olympic Park Line (special events only)	Redfern towards Central
North Strathfield towards Hornsby	Northern Line	Burwood towards Gordon
Preceding station	Intercity Trains	Following station
Epping towards Newcastle Interchange	Central Coast & Newcastle Line (weekday peak only)	Redfern towards Central
Epping towards Newcastle Interchange	Central Coast & Newcastle Line	Central Terminus
Parramatta towards Lithgow	Blue Mountains Line	Central Terminus
Parramatta towards Katoomba or Mount Victoria	Blue Mountains Line (weekday peak only)	Redfern towards Central
Preceding station	NSW TrainLink	Following station
Hornsby towards Grafton, Casino or Brisbane	NSW TrainLink North Coast Line	Sydney Terminus
Hornsby towards Moree or Armidale	NSW TrainLink North Western Line	Sydney Terminus
Parramatta towards Broken Hill or Dubbo	NSW TrainLink Western Line	Sydney Terminus

New South Wales Heritage Register
- Official name: Strathfield Railway Station group; Strathfield Triangle; Strathfield Flyover; Strathfield Underbridges
- Type: State heritage (complex / group)
- Designated: 2 April 1999
- Reference no.: 1252
- Type: Railway Platform / Station
- Category: Transport – Rail
Location

Strathfield railway station is a heritage-listed suburban railway station located at the junction of the Main Suburban and Main Northern lines, serving the Sydney suburb of Strathfield. The station is served by Sydney Trains T1 North Shore & Western Line, T9 Northern Line, T2 Leppington & Inner West Line and T3 Liverpool & Inner West Line services and intercity Blue Mountains Line and Central Coast & Newcastle Line services, as well as NSW TrainLink regional services. The station and its associated infrastructure was added to the New South Wales State Heritage Register on 2 April 1999.

== History ==
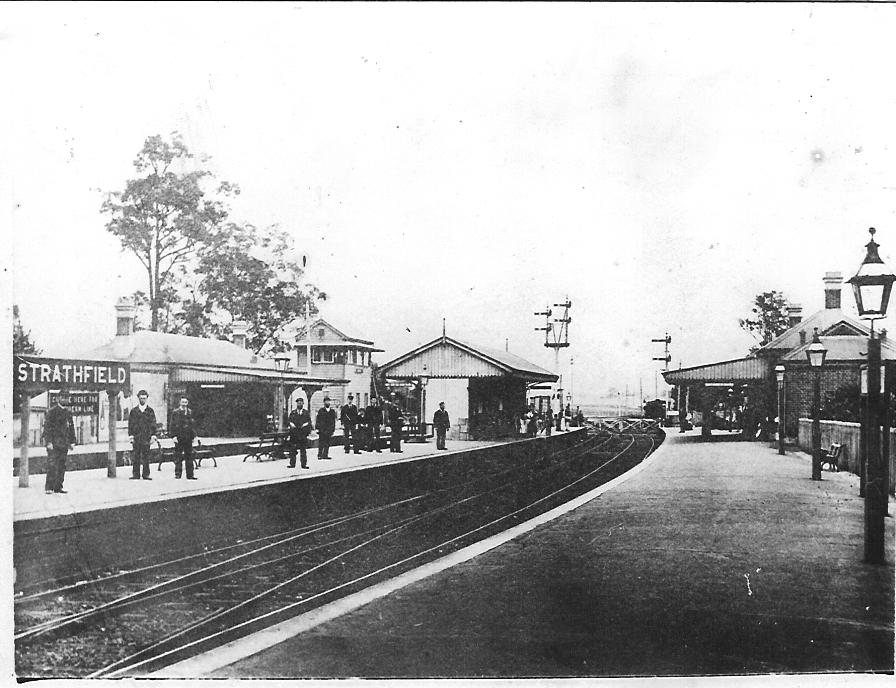
Former Strathfield station

=== Strathfield suburb ===
This suburb, extending from Concord Plains to the Cooks River, was part of the area known (early in the colony) as Liberty Plains, so called because the first free settlers received grants there. James Wilshire received 230 hectares (570 acres) in 1808 and called it Wilshire Farm - the grant lay between the present streets The Boulevarde, Chalmers Street and Liverpool Road.

To the west of this were Church Lands, declared in 1823 to support clergy in the colony, which extended into present day Flemington. In 1841 this was sold and the part south of Barker Road was acquired by Joseph Newton. The grant was sold to Samuel Terry in 1824 and he renamed it Redmyre Estate. The name Redmire (changed c. 1865 to Redmyre) honoured a village in North Yorkshire, England, which was near the birthplace of the Terry family.

In 1885 the area was incorporated as Strathfield. This new name came from the name of a mansion (Strathfieldsaye) built in the district by John Hardie, a wealthy early settler, who chose the name to honour the English estate (Stratfield Saye) given in 1817 by a grateful nation to the Duke of Wellington.

=== Railway station ===
The first section of public railway line built in NSW was from Redfern station to Parramatta station on 26 September 1855. This line passed through the area now known as Strathfield. No station was provided at Strathfield, the closest stations were Burwood station and Homebush station.

The first station at Strathfield was named Redmyre and opened as a "halt" on 9 September 1876. It was renamed Strathfield on 8 March 1885. The first use of the present name "Strathfield" was adopted on 8 March 1886 and was named after the mansion Strathfield House, owned by James Hardy. Strathfield station came into prominence with the construction of the Main Northern line, which had its junction off the Western line at Strathfield. The first section to Hornsby station opened on 17 September 1886. Four platforms were provided, two for the Western line and two for the Northern line. A new mechanical signal box was built on the down-side behind the down western platform, this was the first signal box at Strathfield. A station was built on a new site in 1900, and yet again in 1922. The line was quadruplicated between 1891 and 1892, causing track alterations and requiring the construction of a pedestrian subway at the western end of the station to connect all platforms.

The 1900 platforms, overhead station building and road bridge were demolished and the present four-island platforms were built, giving a total of eight platforms. Access to these was now via a centrally located pedestrian subway and ramps. A short Parcels Platform was also built on the down side of the Down Local Line at the Sydney end. The land required for the extra platforms was reclaimed from The Boulevard and Clarendon Street (Albert Road).

As part of the electrification of the Sydney network, the station was rebuilt, opening on 7 March 1927. This included an overpass to take the Main Northern line over the Main Suburban line. In addition, a platform and building was erected at the southern end of platform eight which provided a mortuary receiving facility. This was subsequently converted to a store for the railway refreshment room on the station.

As part of reconstruction of the station area and for the future electrification of the western and northern rail lines a new Power Signal Box was built at Strathfield. This (the third signal box) was located on the Down side parallel to the Down Local at the country end of the station. It was built on a resumed, triangular block of land bounded by the Main Western Line to its north and Clarendon Street (Albert Road) to its south. The power signal box was the third signal box erected at Strathfield, the previous two signal boxes becoming "mechanical signal boxes". Strathfield power signal box controlled all train movements from the Sydney side of Wentworth Road overbridge (east), through Strathfield platforms and the tracks to the north and west of the flyover at the country end.

When the line from Strathfield to Hornsby was completed in the 1920s, Strathfield became the junction of all trains going north and west - an important rail junction.

An incident occurred at the station in 1972, in which stationmaster Frank Thompson was killed whilst attempting to subdue a man who had passed through the turnstiles without a ticket and stabbed 4 commuters. The incident was commemorated with the placement of a clock and plaque on platform 3 of the station.

In 1982, as part of the upgrading and modernising of the suburban signalling system the Strathfield power signal box was close to being replaced by the new Strathfield Signal Box complex located at Homebush incorporating a Relay Based Route Locking Signalling System. The new complex also replaced signal boxes at Ashfield, North Strathfield, Concord West, Homebush, Flemington Car Sidings, Flemington Goods Junction and Lidcombe.

Strathfield continues to be a busy and important junction station with the signalling complex at Homebush being the second largest signal box in the Sydney Metropolitan area.

Rail traffic in the Strathfield area has been controlled from Strathfield signal box, which is actually situated at Homebush, since 1983. Signalling at Strathfield is controlled by an entrance-exit (NX) route control panel with an early automatic route setting (ARS) system, which was manufactured by Westinghouse in the United Kingdom. This system is connected to double light colour light signals and electro-pneumatic switch machines on the ground. The 1926-vintage power box, which had a Westinghouse miniature lever frame, still stands to the west end of platform 8.

In 1998, the station was upgraded with the provision of lifts on each island platform.

=== Strathfield substation ===
In 1927, the section of the suburban line to Strathfield was electrified, and at this time the Strathfield Substation was built. The Substation came into use on 27 August 1928, and was one of the 15 electrical substations built in the Sydney area between 1926 and 1932.

The Strathfield Substation was replaced by a new installation to the north of the original building. After this, the substation was converted to a fabrication workshop for signalling equipment, and has been used since 1990 by the Signal Branch to house its workshop. When this occurred, a modern extension was added to its south wing, removing the area on that side where the outdoor transformers were formerly located. At this time, the building was modified internally also, with offices added at the mezzanine level, a new crane installed on the original crane tracks and floor areas altered.

=== Intercity route changes ===
The expansion of Strathfield into a major suburban, intercity and interstate interchange was a factor in the popularity of Strathfield as a residential suburb for the colony's — later the state's — business and political elite. For example, prime minister Earle Page chose to buy a home in Strathfield because of its direct services to Melbourne, then the seat of federal parliament, and his electorate on the north coast of New South Wales. When the federal capital moved to Canberra, direct services from Strathfield extended there. Other prime ministers of the early 20th century who lived near Strathfield station included George Reid and Frank Forde (in Strathfield), Billy Hughes (in Homebush) and William McMahon (in Burwood). However, in 2013, with the upgrading of the East Hills line, intercity trains heading southwest to Canberra and Melbourne from Sydney Central began to use that line, leaving only intercity trains to the north and west to continue using Strathfield station.

== Services ==
=== Platforms ===
Platform	Line	Stopping pattern	Notes
1	Central Coast & Newcastle Line	Services to Sydney Central	
1	North Coast Region	Services to Sydney Central	
1	North Western Region	Services to Sydney Central	
1	North Shore & Western Line	Services to Central, North Sydney & Hornsby via Gordon	Occasionally used
1	Northern Line (Sydney)	Services to Central, North Sydney & Gordon	Occasionally used
2	Blue Mountains Line	Services to Sydney Central	
2	Olympic Park Line	Special event services to Central	
2	Western Region	services to Sydney Central	
2	North Shore & Western Line	Services to Hornsby & Berowra via Gordon	Occasionally used
2	Northern Line (Sydney)	Services to Central, North Sydney & Gordon	Occasionally used
3	Blue Mountains Line	Services to Springwood, Katoomba, Mount Victoria & Lithgow via Parramatta	
3	Central Coast & Newcastle Line	Services to Newcastle via Epping	
3	Olympic Park Line	Special event services to Olympic Park	
3	Western Region	Services to Dubbo & Broken Hill	
3	North Western Region	Services to Armidale/Moree	
3	North Coast Region	Services to Grafton, Casino & Brisbane	
3	North Shore & Western Line	Services to Richmond & Emu Plains	Occasionally used
3	Northern Line (Sydney)	Services to Hornsby via Epping	Occasionally used
4	North Shore & Western Line	Services to Hornsby & Berowra via Gordon	
4	North Shore & Western Line	6 Express evening peak hour services to Central	
4	Leppington & Inner West Line	Services to Central & the City Circle	Occasionally used
4	Liverpool & Inner West Line	Services to Central & the City Circle	Occasionally used
5	Northern Line (Sydney)	Services to Gordon via Central	
6	North Shore & Western Line	Services to Richmond & Emu Plains	
6	North Shore & Western Line	6 Express morning peak hour services to Blacktown via Parramatta	
6	Leppington & Inner West Line	Services to Leppington & Parramatta	Occasionally used
6	Liverpool & Inner West Line	Services to Liverpool via Regents Park	Occasionally used
6	Northern Line (Sydney)	Services to Hornsby via Epping	
6	Western Region	Services to Dubbo & Broken Hill	Occasionally used
6	North Western Region	Services to Armidale/Moree	Occasionally used
6	North Coast Region	Services to Grafton, Casino & Brisbane	Occasionally used
7	Leppington & Inner West Line	Services to Central & the City Circle	
7	Liverpool & Inner West Line	Services to Central & the City Circle	
8	Leppington & Inner West Line	Services to Homebush, Parramatta, Liverpool & Leppington	
8	Liverpool & Inner West Line	Services to Liverpool via Regents Park	

=== Transport links ===
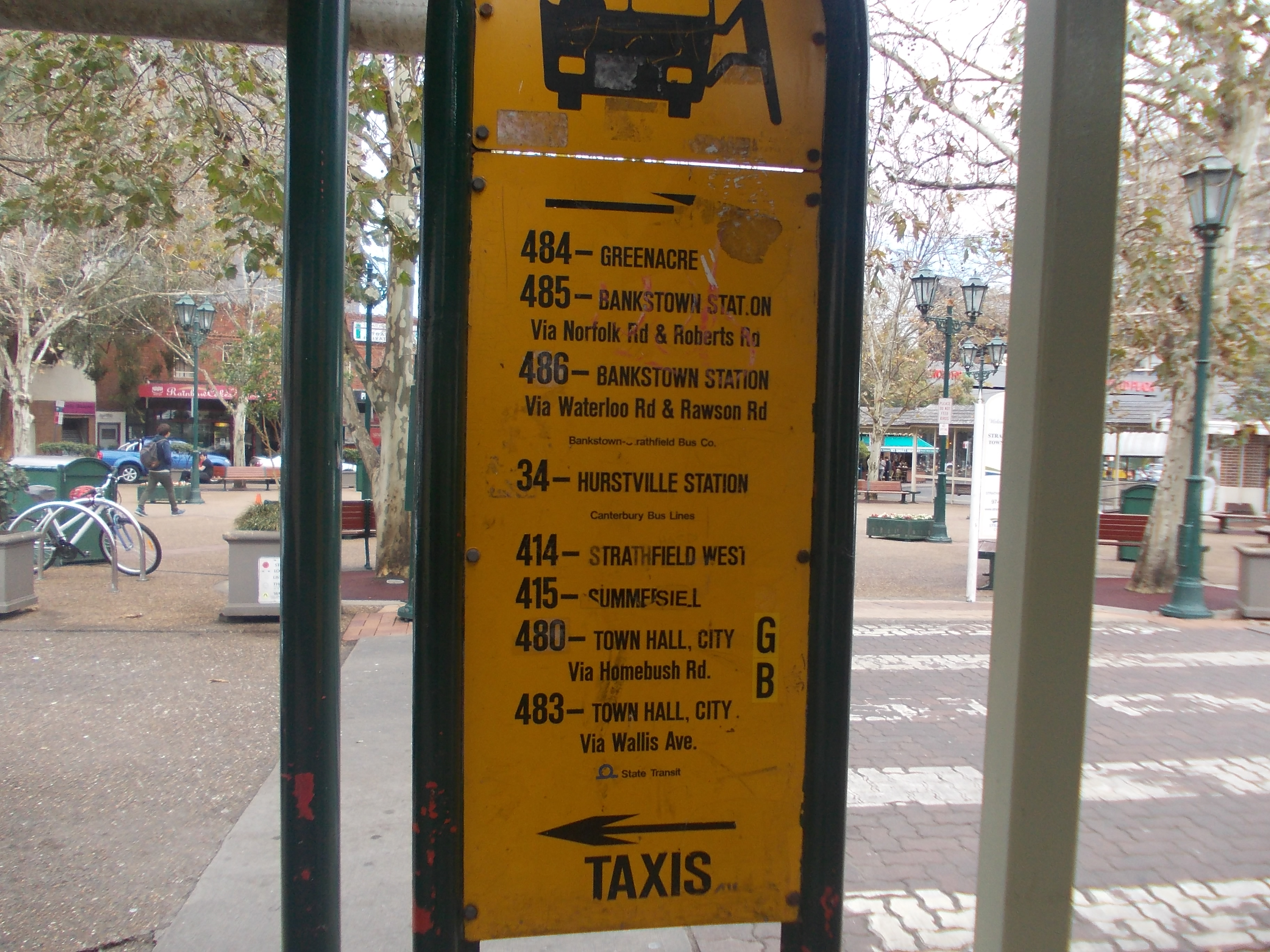
A remnant 1990s bus interchange sign outside the station in August 2014. This sign has since been removed.

Busways operates one bus route from Strathfield station, under contract to Transport for NSW:

- 525: to Parramatta station via Olympic Park

Transit Systems operates ten bus routes via Strathfield station, under contract to Transport for NSW:

- 407: to Burwood via Strathfield West
- 408: Rookwood Cemetery to Burwood via Flemington station
- 415: Campsie station to Chiswick
- 458: Ryde to Burwood
- 480: to Central station via Homebush Road, Ashfield and Parramatta Road
- 483: to Central station via Wallis Avenue, Ashfield and Parramatta Road
- 526: Burwood to Rhodes Shopping Centre via Newington and Olympic Park wharf
- 913: to Bankstown station via Roberts Road & Chullora
- 914: to Greenacre
- M90: Burwood to Liverpool station via Bankstown station

U-Go Mobility operates one bus route via Strathfield station, under contract to Transport for NSW:

- 450: to Hurstville

Strathfield station is served by four NightRide routes:

- N50: Liverpool station to Town Hall station
- N60: Fairfield station to Town Hall station
- N61: Carlingford station to Town Hall station
- N80: Hornsby station to Town Hall station

== Heritage listing ==
The listed station complex and associated infrastructure comprises a type 18, cast iron and timber building with 1-8 platforms, erected in 1927; cast iron and timber platform awnings for platforms 1–8, also erected in 1927; a brick and fibro gambrel roof power box that served as a former signal box, also erected in 1927; a brick parcels room and platform on the down local line; and a substation in triangle. Other major structures include a brick pedestrian subway at the Sydney end of the station, erected in 1927; ramps to all platforms with brick walls, also erected in 1927; and a pedestrian subway at the west end, under all tracks, also erected in 1927. Landscaped works include a brick wall opposite platform 1 on the up main loop.

Strathfield is a superb example of a large station that presents a coherent and uniform set of structures. It is the only example of the large awning structure station without on-platform buildings. It is located at a major junction with eight platforms and an elaborate subway system to service them. The quality of the platform structures is high and represents technological achievement that was compatible with design in Britain at the time. The structure uses decorative elements in the columns with plinths and capitals, elegant curved brackets, patterned fascias and being on a curve, presents an elegant and refined structure.

The former signal box is one of a few surviving large power boxes that adds to the station group and is significant in its own right.

The parcels office is a good example of a freestanding standard structure, very few of which survive.

Strathfield railway station was listed on the New South Wales State Heritage Register on 2 April 1999 having satisfied the following criteria.

The place possesses uncommon, rare or endangered aspects of the cultural or natural history of New South Wales.

This item is assessed as historically rare. This item is assessed as archaeologically rare. This item is assessed as socially rare.

The heritage listing of the Strathfield Railway Station group of structures includes the Strathfield Triangle, Strathfield Flyover and Strathfield Underbridges railway structures nearby.

== See also ==
- List of railway stations in Sydney
- Strathfield rail underbridges
