= Abattoirs railway station =

Former railway station in New South Wales, Australia

Abattoirs

General information
- Other names: State Abattoirs
- Location: Sydney Olympic Park; Sydney, New South Wales; Australia
- Coordinates: 33°50′30″S 151°04′04″E
- Operator: State Rail Authority
- Line: Abattoirs
- Distance: 19.420 km (12.067 mi) from Central
- Platforms: 1 (1 bay)
- Tracks: 3

Construction
- Structure type: Ground

Other information
- Status: Demolished

History
- Opened: 17 December 1926 (99 years ago)
- Closed: 9 November 1984 (41 years ago)

Services
Preceding station	Former services	Following station
Terminus	Abattoirs Line	Brickworks towards Flemington or Auburn
Location

Abattoirs railway station was a suburban railway station and the terminus of the Abattoirs line, serving the State Abattoirs at Homebush Bay, in the modern Sydney suburb of Sydney Olympic Park. Built to provide transport to workers at the abattoirs, the station also received public passenger services until its closure in November 1984.

== History ==
Plans for a public abattoir for Sydney were first established in 1850 by the Sydney Abattoir Act. Previously, meat production had been carried out by private slaughterhouses. Initially an abattoir was established on Glebe Island but by the end of the 19th century, poor management, unsanitary conditions and the expansion of the city resulted in plans to construct an alternative abattoirs.

Tenders for the construction of a State Abattoirs were advertised in 1909, and were awarded to the McLeod Brothers Company in April 1910. The Abattoirs railway line opened in 1911, with the new State Abattoirs commencing operations on 7 April 1915. Opened by Premier William Holman, two special trains carried 425 guests from Central to Abattoirs for the opening ceremony . Upon opening, the State Abattoirs had been unfinished and could only support local demand until completion. All facilities were completed and fully operational by 1923, resulting in expanded capacity. During this time it was the largest operating abattoirs in the Commonwealth, and one of the largest in the world.

Abattoirs station was opened on 17 December 1926, built primarily for workers at the State Abattoirs. Initially, the workers' rail services terminating at Abattoirs station were secondary to bus services from Flemington station provided by the Employees' Welfare Association. The association had been created by the Metropolitan Meat Industry Board in 1919, and had provided bus services from the mid-1920s. However, these bus services ceased on 2 November 1931 and rail subsequently became the primary form of public transport to the State Abattoirs. In the 1930s, the site of the station was moved and it was rebuilt, reopening on 10 November 1938.

On the morning of 17 September 1948, an explosion occurred at a plant used to neutralise fumes from the treatment of by-products at the abattoirs which was located near the station. Jagged pieces of metal were hurled onto the railway tracks as a result.

Most passenger services were through services terminating at Abattoirs from Lidcombe or Auburn, although in the 1950s a limited number of services were provided from Central via Flemington.

The State Abattoirs and adjacent Abattoirs railway line had become neglected by the 1970s, and falling meat exports as well as rising debt led to uncertainty surrounding the future of the facility. Due to the fall in demand, all rail services beyond Pippita ceased on 9 November 1984; the final day of service to Abattoirs station which closed on the same day.

The State Abattoirs itself closed on 10 June 1988, and was demolished to redevelop the area into Sydney Olympic Park for the 2000 Summer Olympics. The site of the former station is now part of the Sydney Showground, near the Sydney Showground Stadium.

== Description ==
A single one-sided bay platform was provided for passenger services, located at the northeast side of the Metropolitan Meatworks within the abattoirs complex. Half the platform was constructed from brick, and the other half was wooden. A level crossing was located at the through end of the platform. Multiple raised loading docks were also constructed for the transportation of animals to, and meat products from, the State Abattoirs. Three tracks were laid in the immediate vicinity of the station.
