= Balloon loop =

Rail loop for turning vehicles

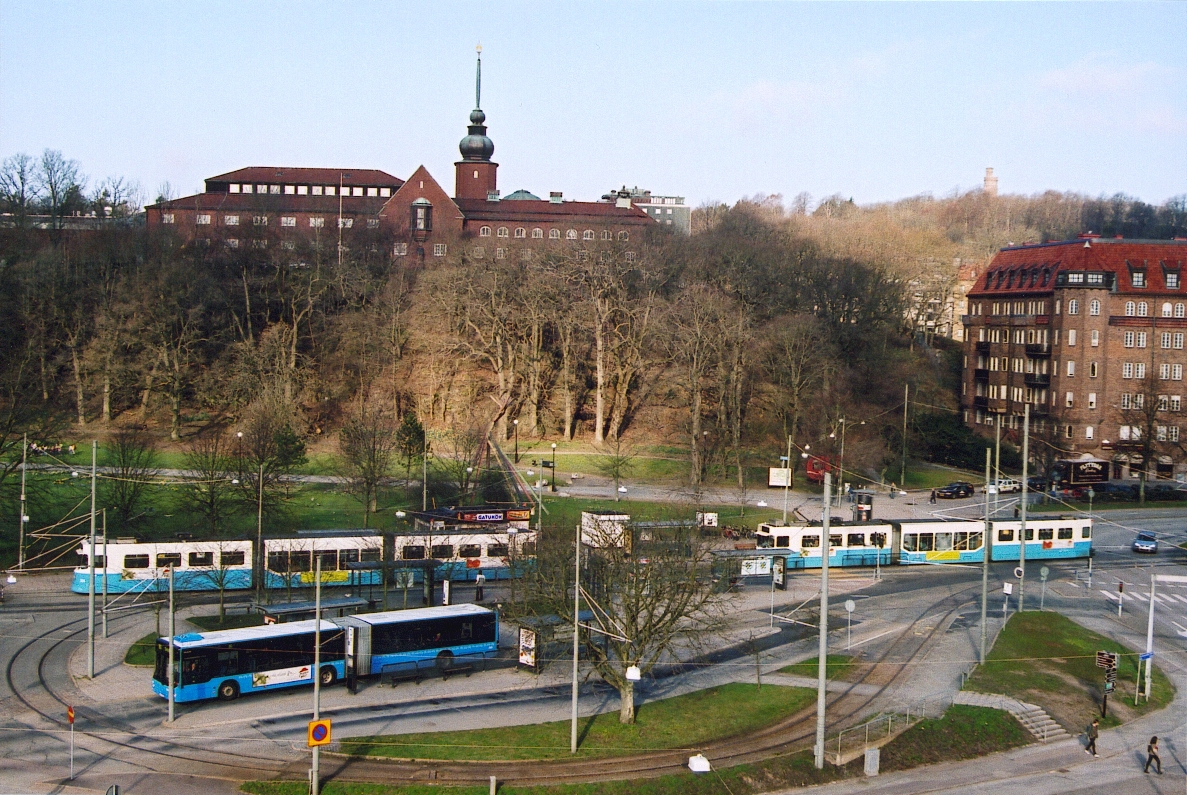
Balloon loop at Linnéplatsen at the tramway in Gothenburg, Sweden.

Double sided island platform on a balloon loop - Olympic Park, Sydney, Australia P1 & P4 departures P2 & P3 arrivals

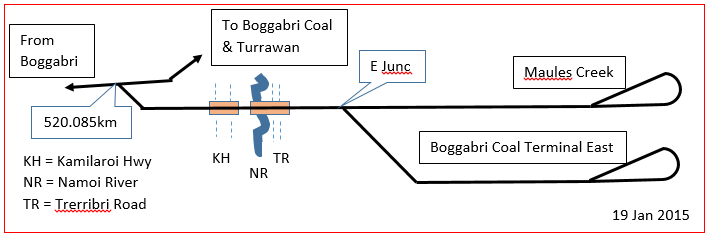
Maules Creek & Boggabri Coal Terminal East balloon loops

A balloon loop, turning loop, or reversing loop (North American Terminology) allows a rail vehicle or train to reverse direction without having to shunt or stop. Balloon loops can be useful for passenger trains and unit freight trains.

Balloon loops are common on tram and streetcar systems. Many streetcar and tram systems use single-ended vehicles that have doors on only one side and controls at only one end. These systems may also haul trailers with no controls in the rear car, and, as such, must be turned at each end of the route.

== History ==
Balloon loops were first introduced on tram and, later, metro lines. They did not commonly appear on freight railways until the 1960s, when the modernising British Rail system introduced merry-go-round (MGR) coal trains that operated from mines to power stations and back again without shunting.

=== Tramways ===
Light-rail train using the balloon loop at Lechmere station in Cambridge, Massachusetts, US in 2020

On the former Sydney tram system, loops were used from 1881 until the second-generation system's closure in 1961. Initially, the Sydney system was operated by single-ended steam trams; then from the 1890s by double-ended electric trams. Lines were looped in the Sydney CBD and the other busiest areas of operation, such as the eastern suburbs lines, as they provided greater turn-around capacity on the crowded system. The Sydney system was the first example of a tramway system using loops and has continued to build them up to 1997 (third-generation system).

Later in the 19th century, looped streetcar (tram) lines also began to appear on systems in the US, and soon looped operation with single-ended streetcars became widely used on many North American streetcar systems. European systems were almost universally converted to looped operation in the early 20th century, and most also adopted single-ended trams. Loops were also used on some tramways in Asia, South America and New Zealand, as well as on other Australian systems in addition to Sydney. Looped operation with single-ended trams is still the predominant method of tramway operation in the world, in spite of the recent construction of some new, typically smaller, stubbed systems with double-ended trams.

== Usage ==
Balloon loops are used extensively on tramway systems with single-ended trams. Usually located at termini, the loop may be a single one-way track round a block. Single-ended trams have a cab at only one end and doors on one side, making them cheaper and having more space for passengers. On tram systems with double-ended trams balloon loops are not required but may still be used as they can provide greater turn-around capacity than a stub terminus.

Balloon loops enable higher line capacity (faster turnaround of a larger number of trams) and allow the use of single-ended trams which have several advantages, including lower cost and more seating. However, double-ended trams also benefit from the capacity advantage of balloon loops.

Occasionally, balloon loops are used for reversing trains on lines with heavy grades and tight curves to equalize wear on both sides of locomotives and rollingstock. Such a balloon loop was constructed at Beech Forest on the 2 ft 6 in (762 mm) Victorian Railways line from Colac to Crowes.

=== Efficiency and convenience of operation ===
- Trains can arrive and leave simultaneously, as long as an open platform exists.
- Time is not lost while drivers change ends and reset the train for the other direction.
- Eliminates the need for brake test if locomotives uncoupled to carry out run around the move.

=== Infrastructure optimisation ===
- Fewer tracks and platforms are required.
- Arrivals into some platforms do not block departures from other platforms.

=== Train maintenance and durability ===
- Reversal allows even wear and tear on the wheels.

=== Spatial and structural constraints ===
- Very space-consuming.
- If the driver changed ends and discovers a hidden fault, delays are less likely.

=== Track and train adaptability ===
- The sharp curves cause noise, as well as wear on wheels and rails.
- Due to the presence of sharp curves in balloon loops, heavy haul trains are required to operate at reduced speeds to ensure safe and efficient movement.
- On systems, where, for reasons of economy, the couplings are made non-reversible (e.g. by fitting the air brake pipe along one side of the car only), the use of a balloon loop will cause a proportion of the rolling stock to face the "wrong" way and it may not be possible to assemble a complete train in a depot, even if sufficient cars are on hand.

=== Solutions ===
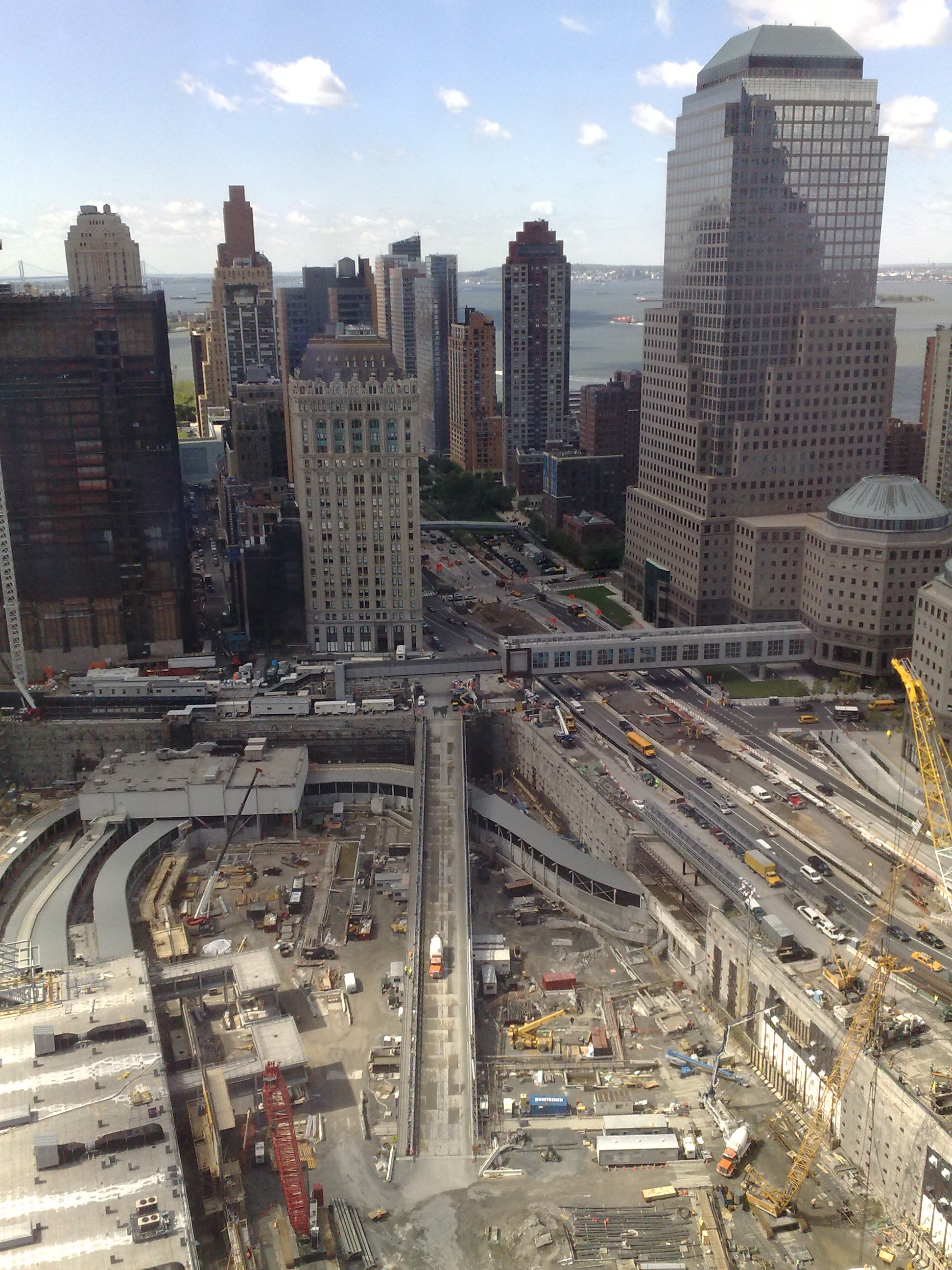
View of the balloon loop at the temporary PATH World Trade Center station from above.

- On many systems with a balloon loop, the couplings and brake hoses are made reversible.
- At coal ports such as Kooragang in Newcastle, New South Wales the space inside the balloon loops is used for storing coal so that it is not wasted.
- At the Olympic Park station in Sydney Olympic Park, the loop is flattened where the platforms are located, so that the platform faces are straight.
- After the opening of a loop at Charing Cross (Embankment) in 1914 (replaced in 1926 by the present Kennington loop) car ends were marked "A" or "B" (later, when axles were designated by letters, the "B" car ends became "D" to match the adjacent axle), and it was not permitted to couple cars together if the ends to be coupled bore the same letter. It was found necessary to provide a turntable at Golders Green depot (near the other end of the line), for use when there was an imbalance of car directions.
- The former South Ferry station on the New York City Subway solved the railcar door hazard by using gap fillers that extended out to the railcar door when the train triggered a switch on the tracks. The older station was closed in 2009, but was reopened between 2013 and 2017 as a result of damage to the newer station caused by Hurricane Sandy.
