= Olympic Park railway line =

Railway line in Sydney, Australia

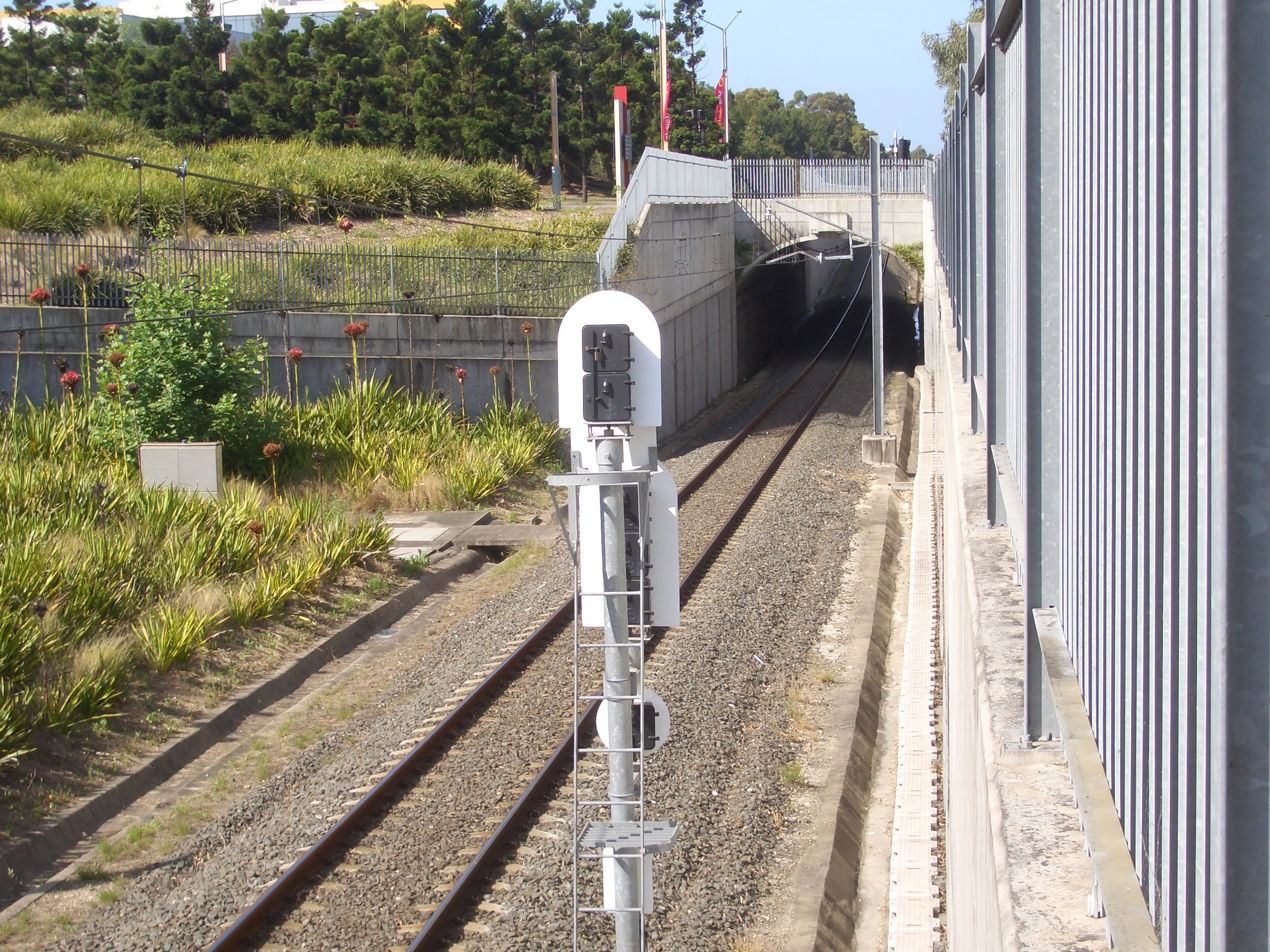
- The single track balloon loop towards Lidcombe as it passes under the Olympic Boulevard.

Overview
- Owner: Transport Asset Manager of New South Wales
- Locale: Sydney, New South Wales, Australia
- Termini: Lidcombe; Olympic Park
- Stations: 2

Service
- Operator: Sydney Trains

History
- Opened: 13 July 1911 (Abattoirs)
- Closed: 20 October 1995
- Reopened: 8 March 1998 (Olympic Park)

Technical
- Track length: 7 km (4.3 mi)
- Num of tracks: 3
- Track gauge: 1,435 mm (4 ft 8 1/2 in) standard gauge
- Electrification: 1,500 V DC from overhead catenary

The Olympic Park railway line is a railway line linking the Sydney Olympic Park precinct to the Main Suburban railway line at Flemington and Lidcombe. Originally opened as the Abattoirs branch in 1911, it was rebuilt and reopened as the Olympic Park railway line in 1998. Passenger services have since been running on it as the Olympic Park Line (numbered T7, grey).

== History ==
=== Abattoirs branch ===
The line opened on 31 July 1911 as the Abattoirs branch off the Main Suburban railway line to the abattoirs and State Brickworks at Homebush Bay (now Sydney Olympic Park). It branched off via a triangular junction behind Flemington Maintenance Depot making it accessible from the Metropolitan Goods line.

Two bridges carried the line over the Great Western Highway. On 11 January 1915, Metropolitan Meat Platform opened. Further stations opened at Abattoirs in December 1926, Brickworks in December 1939 and Pippita in October 1940 to serve a Commonwealth Aircraft Corporation factory. Sidings on the line served Dairy Farmers and Ford.

On 27 February 1968, the three kilometre Homebush Saleyards Yard opened to service new cattle and sheep pens built to replace facilities at Flemington just beyond the Great Western Highway crossing. The loop was electrified to allow 46 class locomotives to operate services from the Main Western and Main Northern lines to the saleyards.

Passenger services were operated by CPH railmotors operating from Sandown via Lidcombe until November 1984. On 9 November 1984, the line beyond the Homebush Saleyards closed. After this the line (now only going to Pippita) would be served by Single Deck Suburban single deck stock. The Saleyards Loop closed on 22 June 1991. Pippita continued to be served by a sole daily service to Central until 20 October 1995, operated in its later days by a V set. Only traces of the line remain beyond Pippita. The Dairy Farmers siding is still connected to the present-day Up Homebush Bay West Fork track, complete with catch points and a shunt signal. Remnants of the track can also be seen between the siding and the western bridge across the Great Western Highway. There is no trace of the line past here.

=== Reopening ===
As part of Sydney's successful bid to hold the 2000 Olympic Games, a new Sydney Olympic Park precinct was built. Included was a railway that traversed a similar route to the former Abattoirs branch. The line was built with a balloon loop and the two track, four platform Olympic Park station. The line utilised the existing eastern bridge over the Great Western Highway which had previously only carried one track, but was wide enough to accommodate the two laid. The new line opened on 8 March 1998.

Today, the line continues to transport people to and from major events occurring within the Sydney Olympic Park precinct, but also carries workers and residents of Olympic Park to and from the rest of the Sydney Trains network.

== Service ==
T7 Olympic Park Line

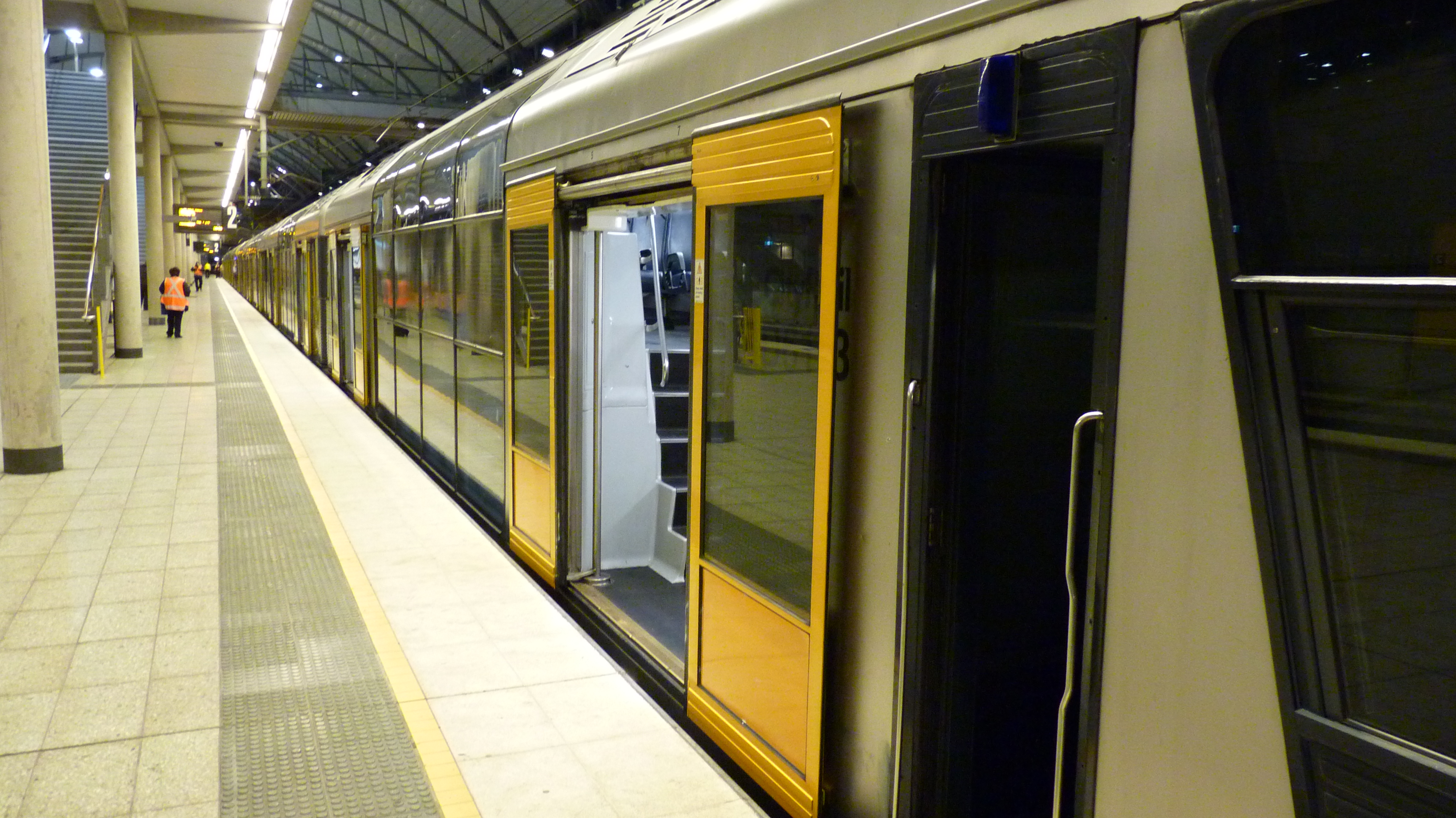
- A T set at Olympic Park station

Overview
- Service type: Commuter rail
- First service: 8 March 1998
- Current operator: Sydney Trains

Route
- Termini: Lidcombe; Olympic Park
- Average journey time: 6 minutes
- Line used: Olympic Park railway line

Technical
- Rolling stock: Lidcombe shuttle: M sets (weekdays), A sets (weekends and public holidays); Special events: A, B and T sets
Sydney rail network
Sydney Trains suburban services
T1 North Shore & Western
T2 Leppington & Inner West
T3 Liverpool & Inner West
T4 Eastern Suburbs & Illawarra
T5 Cumberland
T6 Lidcombe & Bankstown
T7 Olympic Park
T8 Airport & South
T9 Northern
Sydney Metro
M1 Metro North West & Bankstown

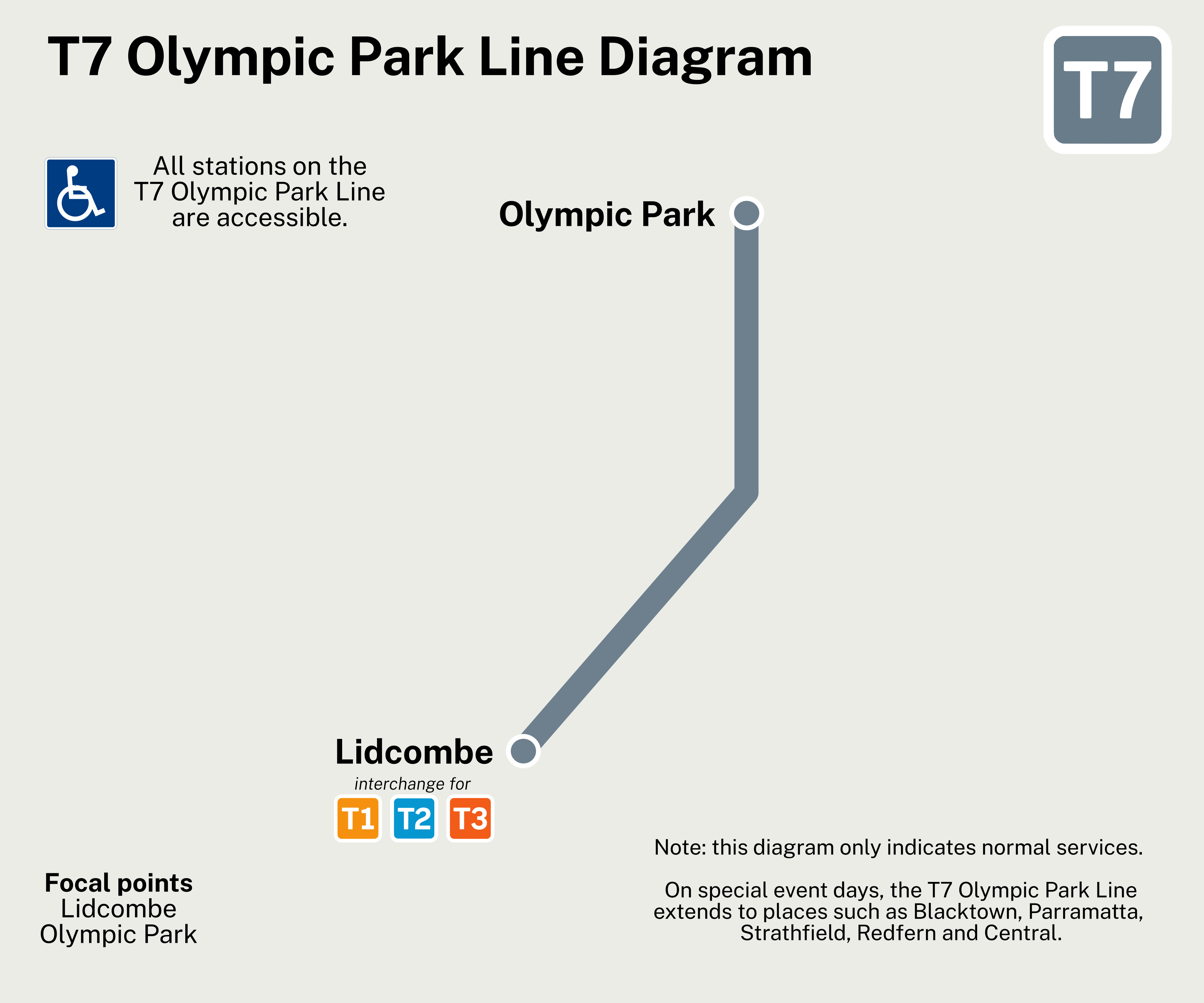
A route diagram of the T7 Olympic Park Line

Outside of special events, trains on the T7 Olympic Park Line depart from a special platform at Lidcombe (platform 0, previously referred to as the Olympic Park Sprint Platform). Services operate with a frequency of one train every 10 minutes in each direction, dropping to 20 minutes at night. The trip between Lidcombe and Olympic Park takes about five minutes each way. As of Tuesday 23 December 2025, 4-car M sets are scheduled for these trips on weekdays, while 8-car A sets are scheduled on weekends and public holidays.

During major events at Sydney Olympic Park, train services run direct from the intercity platforms of Central, also sometimes stopping at Redfern and Strathfield. The Lidcombe shuttle trains are also built up to 8 cars. After larger events, west-bound trains from Olympic Park are sometimes extended beyond Lidcombe to Blacktown via the Western line, and to Glenfield and Campbelltown via the Main South line, using platforms 2 and 4 at Lidcombe instead. These services are normally run by 8-car A, B or T sets.

T7 interactive map

== Rolling stock ==
- New South Wales A and B sets 8-car EMUs
- New South Wales T set 8-car EMUs
- New South Wales M set 4-car EMUs — 8 car during special events

== Patronage ==
The following table shows the patronage of Sydney Trains network for the year ending on 30 June 2024. Because these figures are based on Opal tap on and tap off data, passengers are not counted when travelling to major events where the event ticket also allows travel on public transport services.

2025–26 Sydney Trains patronage by line (Note: Figures based on Opal tap on and tap off data)
| T1 North Shore & Western Line | 79,173,811 | |
| T2 Leppington & Inner West Line | 56,339,459 | |
| T3 Liverpool & Inner West Line | 11,756,216 | (Note: T3 patronage split between former route via Bankstown and current route via Strathfield. The Bankstown route closed 30 September 2024.) |
| T4 Eastern Suburbs & Illawarra Line | 63,990,365 | |
| T5 Cumberland Line | 7,629,714 | |
| T6 Lidcombe & Bankstown Line | 3,307,374 | |
| Olympic Park railway line | 2,400,479 | |
| T8 Airport & South Line | 54,235,162 | |
| T9 Northern Line | 39,379,659 | |

== Pippita Rail Trail ==
In 2022, NSW Government funding was made available for the planning of a proposed 2-km-long Pippita rail trail—a shared cycling and walking path—following the partially-disused Abbatoirs branch rail corridor between Lidcombe station and Sydney Olympic Park. The proposal has received the support of Cumberland Council, and active transport groups such as Bicycle NSW and EcoTransit Sydney.

The proposed Pippita Rail Trail will reuse two now disused rail bridges to cross Parramatta Road and the M4. It will run generally parallel to the Olympic Park railway line over much of its route. The objective of the rail trail is to provide a safe active transport route into Olympic Park, expanding the existing cycling and walking options available there.
