= Flemington railway station =

Railway station in Sydney, New South Wales, Australia

Flemington
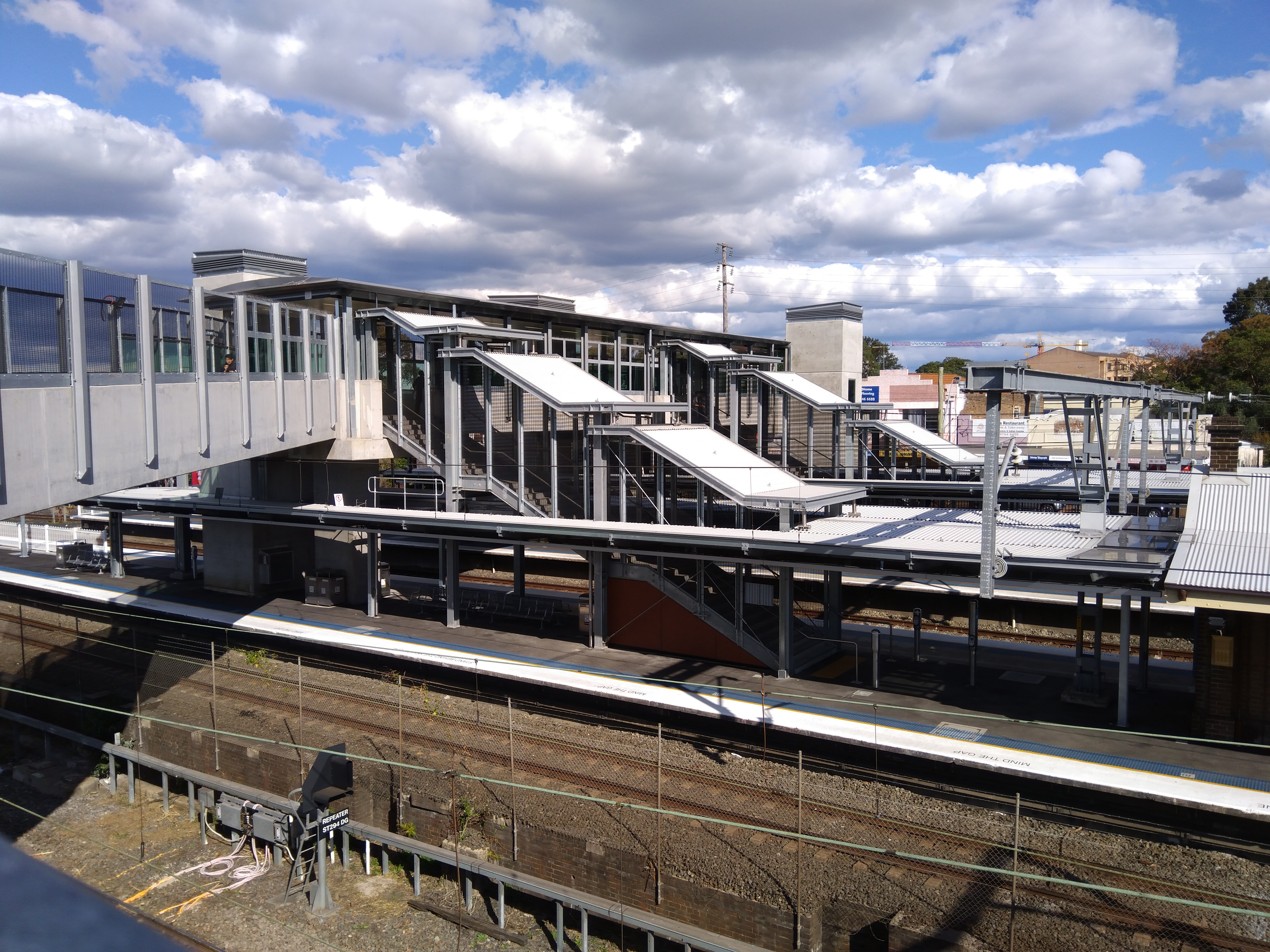
- The station entrance, concourse and platforms in August 2017

General information
- Location: The Crescent, Homebush West; Sydney, New South Wales; Australia
- Coordinates: 33°51′54″S 151°04′12″E
- Owner: Transport Asset Manager of NSW
- Operator: Sydney Trains
- Line: Main Suburban
- Distance: 14.32 km (8.90 mi) from Central
- Platforms: 4 (2 island)
- Tracks: 6
- Connections: Bus

Construction
- Structure type: Ground
- Accessible: Yes

Other information
- Status: Weekdays: Staffed: 6am to 7pm: Weekends and public holidays: Staffed: 6am to 7pm
- Station code: FMG
- Website: Transport for NSW

History
- Opened: 1884 (142 years ago)
- Rebuilt: 25 May 1924 (102 years ago)
- Electrified: Yes (from October 1929)

Passengers
- 2025: 2,851,128 (year); 7,811 (daily) (Sydney Trains)
- Rank: 60

Services
Preceding station	Sydney Trains	Following station
Lidcombe towards Parramatta or Leppington	T2 Leppington & Inner West Line	Homebush towards City Circle
Lidcombe towards Leppington	T2 Leppington & Inner West Line	Strathfield towards City Circle
Lidcombe towards Liverpool	T3 Liverpool & Inner West Line	Homebush towards City Circle
T1 North Shore & Western Line does not stop here
Former services
Preceding station	Former services	Following station
Rookwood towards Bourke	Main Western Line (1887-1967)	Homebush towards Sydney
Pippita towards Abattoirs	Abattoirs Line (1911-1995)	Terminus
Location

Flemington railway station is a suburban railway station located on the Main Suburban line, serving the Sydney suburb of Homebush West. It is served by Sydney Trains T2 Leppington & Inner West and T3 Liverpool & Inner West Line services.

== History ==
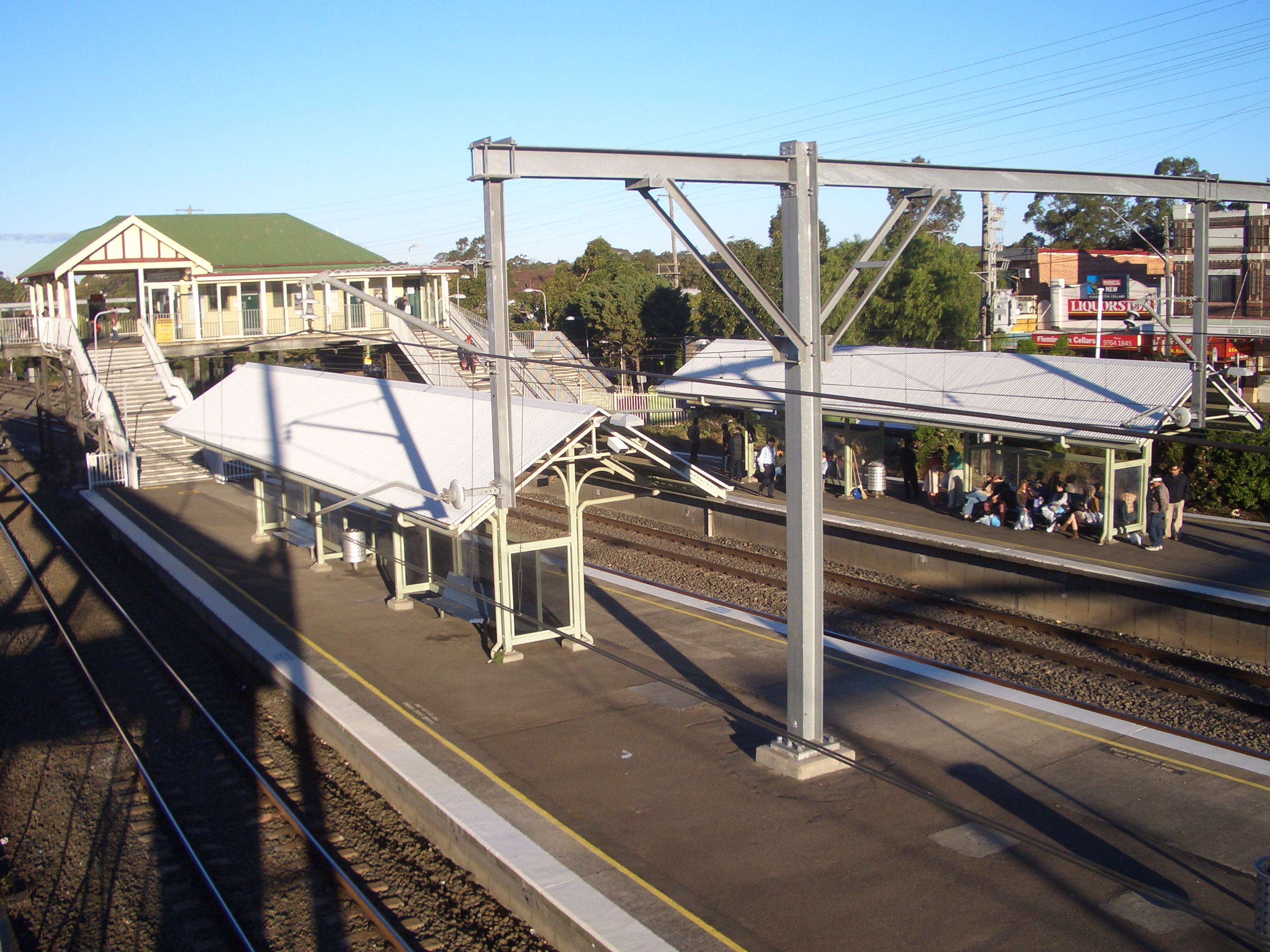
The former concourse in August 2007

Flemington station opened in 1884. On 25 May 1924, it was relocated further west to its present site when the Main Suburban line was quadrupled from Homebush to Lidcombe.

From 1923 until 1972, extensive cattle yards existed opposite the station to the north. This was redeveloped as the Sydney Markets in 1975. It included railway sidings for produce trains. These have since been decommissioned. When Enfield Yard was closed for redevelopment in the mid-1990s, the sidings became a locomotive changeover point for freight trains.

The suburb of Flemington, south of the station, has long been residential. In 1992, the suburb of Flemington was officially renamed "Homebush West", used as a technical term for the houses north of the station. Due to the change in the official name of the suburb and the importance of the neighbouring Sydney Markets, in 2015 a proposal was raised to rename the station to Sydney Markets.

An upgrade to the station was planned from 2014 and works completed in 2018, resulting in the replacement of the historic concourse with a new one with lift access to the platforms.

To the west of the station is the Flemington Maintenance Depot where the Olympic Park line branches off. Between the station and the Sydney Markets lie two tracks exclusively used by freight trains travelling between the Main North line and the Metropolitan Goods line.

== Services ==
=== Platforms ===
Platform	Line	Stopping pattern	Notes
1		no scheduled services	
2		no scheduled services	
3	T2 Leppington & Inner West Line	services to Central & the City Circle	
3	T3 Liverpool & Inner West Line	services to Central & the City Circle (weekday early morning, late night and weekends only)	
4	T2 Leppington & Inner West Line	services to Parramatta & Leppington	
4	T3 Liverpool & Inner West Line	services to Liverpool via Regents Park (weekday early morning, late night and weekends only)	

=== Transport links ===
Transit Systems operates one bus route via Flemington station, under contract to Transport for NSW:

- 408: Rookwood Cemetery to Westfield Burwood

Flemington station is served by two NightRide routes:

- N60 Fairfield station to Town Hall station
- N61 Carlingford station to Town Hall station

== Description ==
Flemington railway station consists of two island platforms. The northern one (platforms numbered 1 and 2) is not in regular use, and regular scheduled services only use the southern island platform (numbered 3 and 4). Stairs and lifts connect the platforms to an overhead concourse. The main village commercial centre of Flemington is south of the station, and the concourse descends to street level here via stairs and a lift. To the north of the station is the large market complex of Sydney Markets at the Flemington locality. The concourse is connected to the markets on the north side via a long, elevated walkway which spans across the freight line tracks and former goods sidings and continues into the market complex.

== Gallery ==
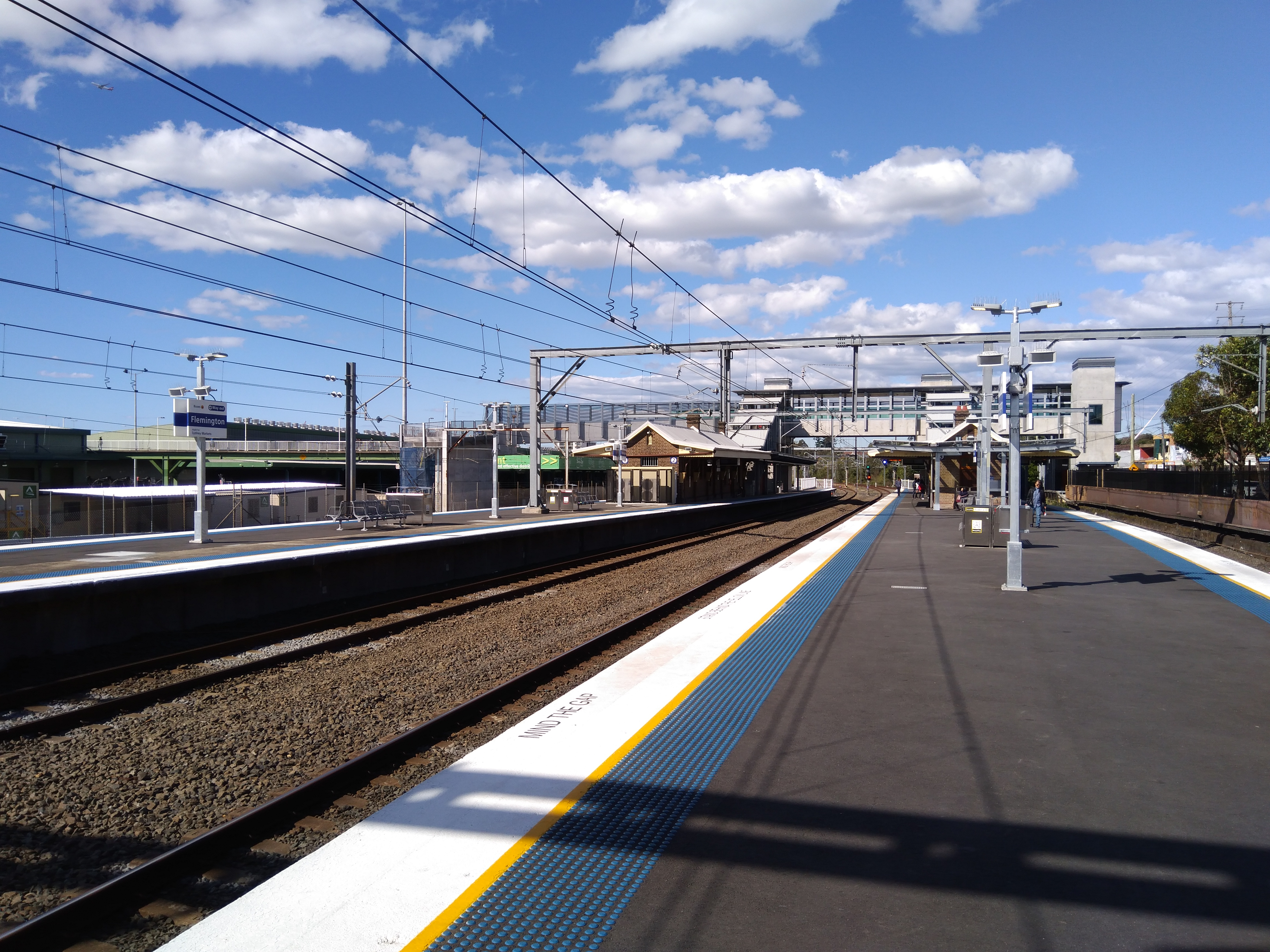
Platforms 3 & 4 in August 2017
