= Auburn railway station, Sydney =

Railway station in Sydney, New South Wales, Australia

Auburn
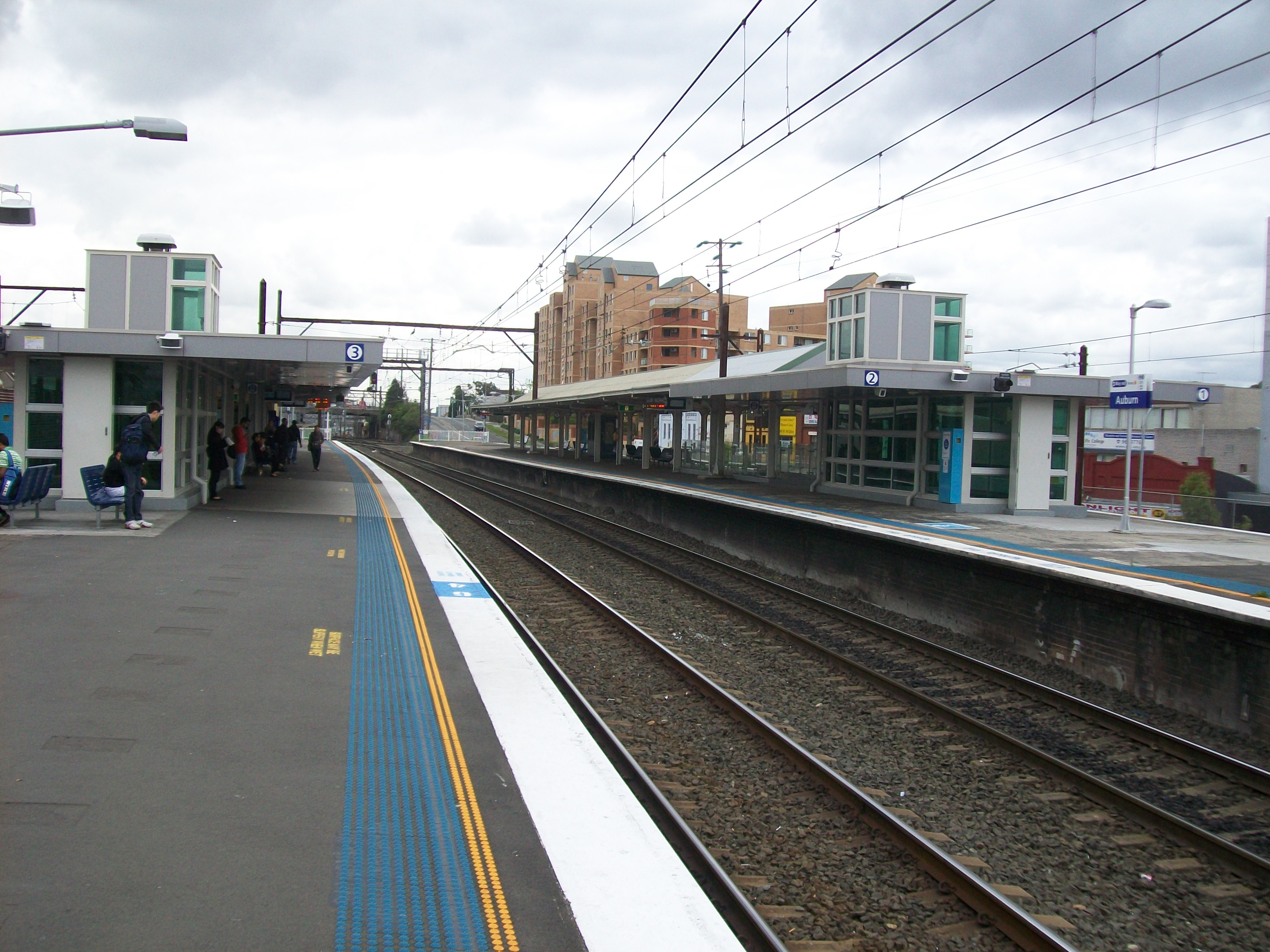
- Westbound view from Platform 3 showing shelters and buildings in January 2008

General information
- Location: Rawson Street, Auburn; Sydney, New South Wales; Australia
- Coordinates: 33°50′58″S 151°01′58″E
- Owner: Transport Asset Manager of NSW
- Operator: Sydney Trains
- Line: Main Suburban
- Distance: 18.63 km (11.58 mi) from Central
- Platforms: 4 (2 island)
- Tracks: 4
- Connections: Bus

Construction
- Structure type: Elevated
- Accessible: Yes

Other information
- Status: Staffed
- Station code: AUB
- Website: Transport for NSW

History
- Opened: 1877 (149 years ago)
- Rebuilt: 1913 (113 years ago); 1954 (72 years ago)
- Electrified: Yes (from 1928)

Passengers
- 2025: 8,141,823 (year); 22,306 (daily) (Sydney Trains)
- Rank: 20

Services
Preceding station	Sydney Trains	Following station
Clyde towards Penrith	North Shore & Western Line Weekday limited and weekends only	Lidcombe towards Berowra
Clyde towards Parramatta or Leppington	Leppington & Inner West Line	Lidcombe towards City Circle
Former services
Preceding station	Former services	Following station
Lidcombe towards Abattoirs	Abattoirs Line (1911–1995)	Terminus
Location

Auburn railway station is a suburban railway station located on the Main Suburban line, serving the Sydney suburb of Auburn. It is served by Sydney Trains T1 Western Line and T2 Leppington & Inner West Line services. The station serves one of the most multi-culturally diverse suburbs in the city.

To the west of the station lies Auburn Railway Signal Box, Auburn Heavy maintenance centre,Auburn Maintenance Centre and a Pacific National depot.

== History ==
Auburn station opened in 1877. The station was rebuilt in 1913 and again in 1954 when the line was quadrupled.

The original subway underneath the platforms was closed in the 1990s, replaced by a new subway further east, which remains in use to this day.

The station was upgraded in 2007 with new lifts and tiling by Haslin Constructions for RailCorp at a cost of $5.5 million.

== Services ==
=== Platforms ===
Platform	Line	Stopping pattern	Notes
1	North Shore & Western Line	occasional early morning & late night services to Hornsby & Berowra via Central & Chatswood	infrequently used
2	North Shore & Western Line	weekday early morning & late night services to Penrith	infrequently used
3	North Shore & Western Line	weekend services to North Sydney, Chatswood and Lindfield via Central	
3	Leppington & Inner West Line	services to the City Circle	
4	North Shore & Western Line	weekend services to Penrith	
4	Leppington & Inner West Line	weekday services to Parramatta services to Leppington	

=== Transport links ===
Busways operates two bus routes via Auburn station, under contract to Transport for NSW:

- 540: to Silverwater Correctional Complex
- 544: to Macquarie Centre

Transit Systems NSW operates four bus routes via Auburn station, under contract to Transport for NSW:

- 908: Merrylands to Bankstown
- 909: Parramatta to Bankstown
- 911: to Bankstown
- S3: to Auburn Botanical Gardens

Auburn railway station is served by two NightRide routes:

- N60: Fairfield station to Town Hall station
- N61: Carlingford station to Town Hall station

== Trackplan ==
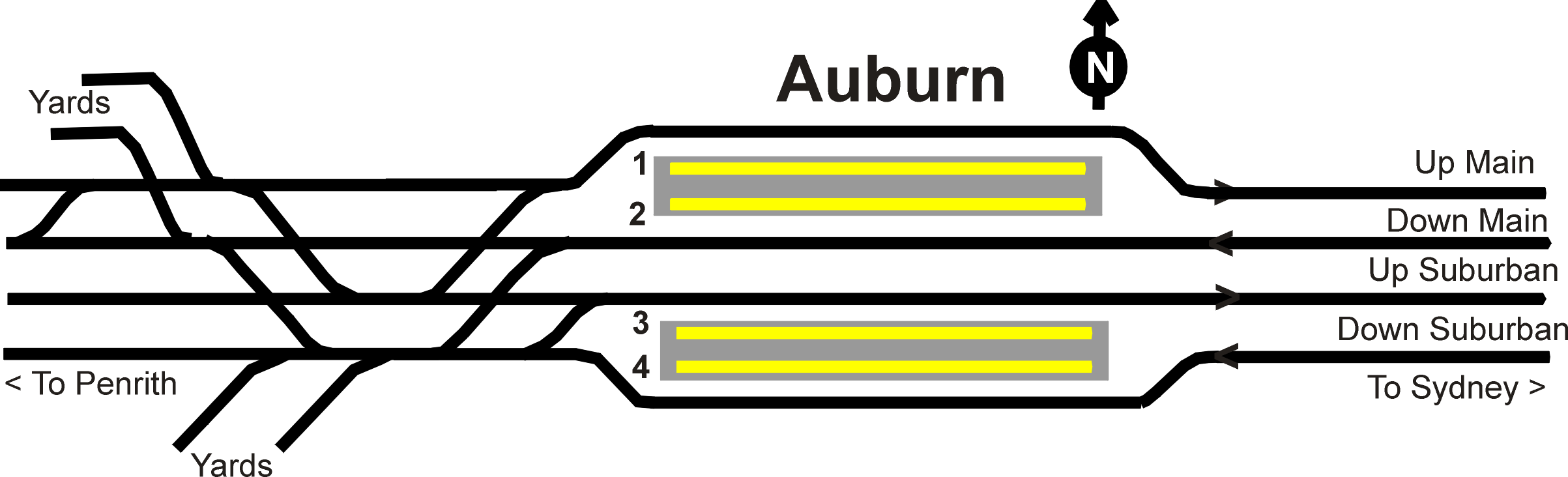
Track arrangement at Auburn
