= Olympic Park railway station, Sydney =

Railway station in Sydney, New South Wales, Australia

Olympic Park
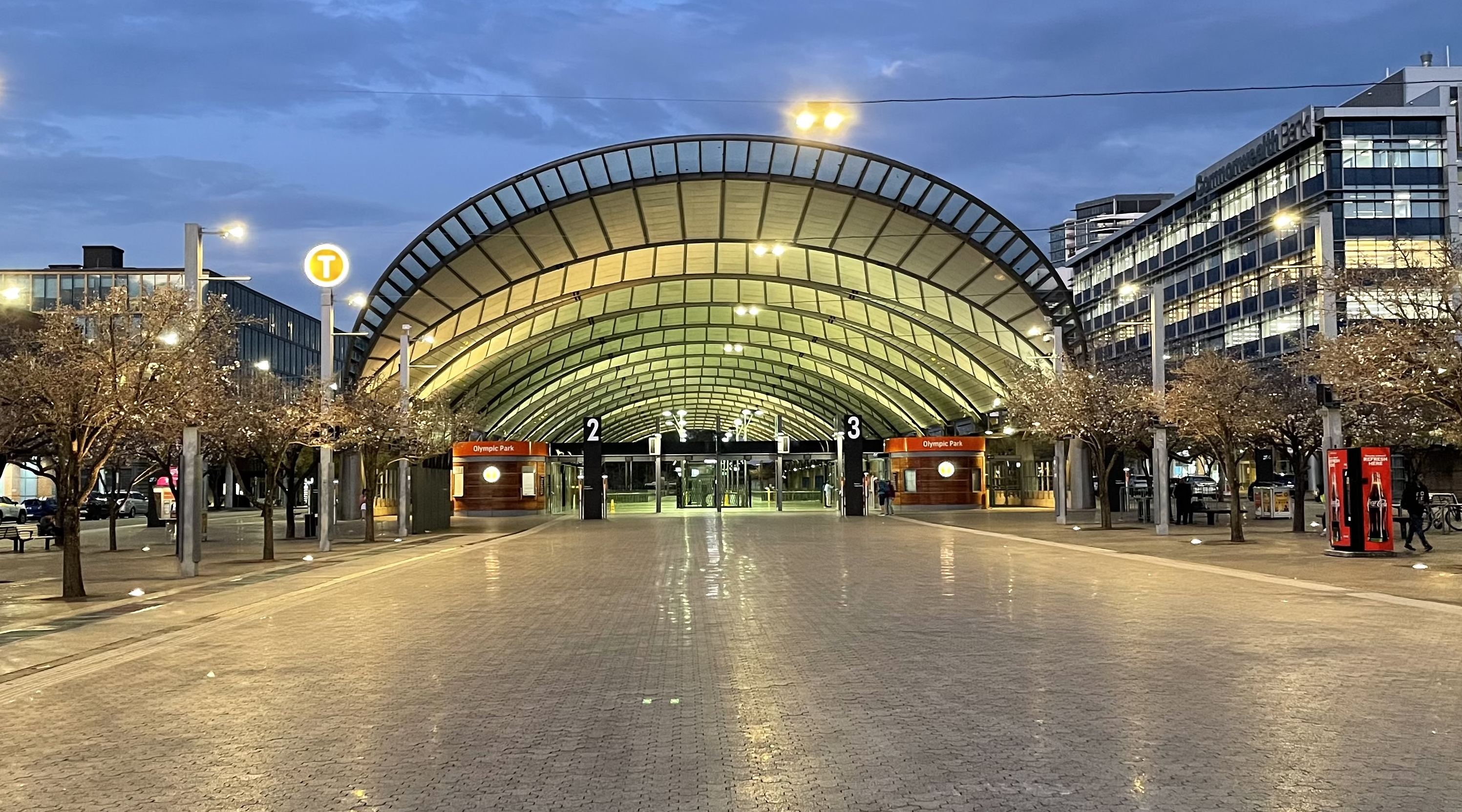
- Station forecourt and entrance in August 2023

General information
- Location: Murray Rose Avenue, Sydney Olympic Park; Sydney, New South Wales; Australia
- Coordinates: 33°50′48″S 151°04′10″E
- Elevation: 20 metres (66 ft)
- Owner: Transport Asset Manager of NSW
- Operator: Sydney Trains
- Line: Olympic Park
- Distance: 17.33 km (10.77 mi) from Central
- Platforms: 4 (2 side, 1 island)
- Tracks: 2
- Connections: Bus

Construction
- Structure type: Underground
- Accessible: Yes

Other information
- Status: Staffed
- Station code: OLP
- Website: Transport for NSW

History
- Opened: 8 March 1998 (28 years ago)
- Electrified: Yes (from opening)

Passengers
- 2025: 2,394,491 (year); 6,560 (daily) (Sydney Trains)
- Rank: 67

Services
Preceding station	Sydney Trains	Following station
Lidcombe Terminus	Olympic Park Line Shuttle services	Terminus
Strathfield towards Central	Olympic Park Line Major event services	Terminus
Location

Olympic Park railway station is a suburban railway station located on the Olympic Park line, serving the Sydney suburb of Sydney Olympic Park. It is served by Sydney Trains T7 Olympic Park Line services. The station is also frequently used to terminate trains from other lines during periods of trackwork.

== History ==
Olympic Park station is now the only station functioning on the Olympic Park railway line, originally built as the Abattoirs line to serve the state abattoirs and associated sale yards located in the area that is now Sydney Olympic Park. The line closed in stages in 1984 and 1995 when these facilities moved out of the area. After the last passenger service on the line was withdrawn in 1995, the line was rebuilt and realigned in places to serve the new stadiums and sports grounds that were being built for the 2000 Summer Olympics.

Olympic Park station opened in 1998 at the same time as the new Sydney Showground nearby, which is used each year for the Sydney Royal Easter Show. As well as Easter Show attendees, the station was designed to support large crowds travelling to and from the stadiums and sports grounds in Olympic Park.

After the 2000 Olympic Games, most of the sporting facilities were retained and adapted to recreational, entertainment and domestic competition uses. The Easter Show also continues to draw large crowds each year. In addition, the Sydney Olympic Park area has seen high density residential developments, as well as the development of hotels, offices and shops. As a result, in addition to transporting crowds attending sporting and other events, Olympic Park station now also fulfils a workday commuter role.

== Design and construction ==
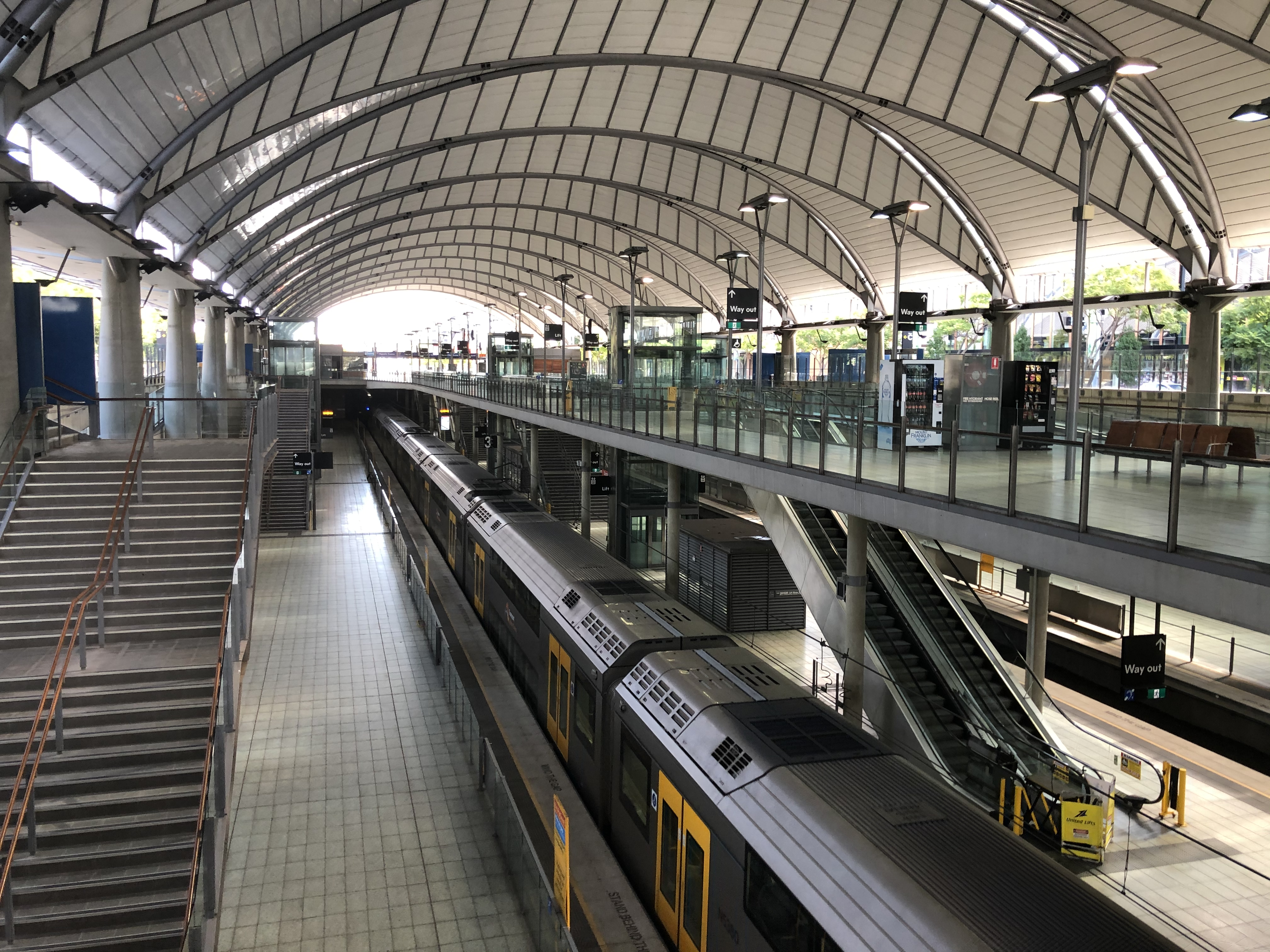
Concourse and platforms

The station is located on a single track balloon loop spur line, but the station itself has 2 tracks and 4 platform faces. Ordinarily, the centre island platform is used for both boarding and alighting, but this changes when the station is operating in major event mode. In this mode, the centre island platform is used by alighting passengers and the two side platforms are brought into use for boarding passengers.

It was built by Leighton Contractors. It was opened by Premier of New South Wales Bob Carr on 8 March 1998.

The design of the station by Hassell has been critically acclaimed by many. It won the 1998 BHP Colorbond Award for innovative use of steel architecture, and the 1998 Sir John Sulman Medal, from the Royal Australian Institute of Architects. In 2023 the station was awarded the New South Wales Enduring Architecture Award in recognition of its design, innovation and longevity, a significant work of public architecture used regularly and enjoyed by millions of visitors to Sydney Olympic Park over 25 years.

== Services ==
=== Platforms ===
Platform	Line	Stopping pattern	Notes
1	Olympic Park Line	major event services to Central (pick up only)	used only during major events
2	Olympic Park Line	major event services from Central (set down only)	used mainly during major events
2	Leppington & Inner West Line	major event services to Leppington (pick up only)	used mainly during major events
2	North Shore & Western Line	major event services to Lidcombe, Blacktown, Schofields and Penrith (pick up only)	used only during major events
3	Olympic Park Line	regular services to Lidcombe	
3	Leppington & Inner West Line	major event services to Leppington (pick up only)	used mainly during major events
3	Cumberland Line	major event services to Schofields (pick up only)	
4	Olympic Park Line	Regular services to and from Lidcombe	

During special events such as the Sydney Royal Easter Show, special services to or from Lidcombe, Blacktown, Schofields and Penrith on the T1 North Shore & Western Line and Leppington on the T2 Inner West & Leppington Line, may operate to or from any of the four platforms.

=== Transport links ===
Busways operates two bus routes via Olympic Park station, under contract to Transport for NSW:

- 525: to Parramatta station
- 533: to Chatswood station

Transit Systems operates one bus route via Olympic Park station, under contract to Transport for NSW:

- 526: Strathfield station to Olympic Park wharf and Rhodes

Sydney Olympic Park metro station will be located to the north of the current station and is planned to open in 2032.

== Trackplan ==
Track layout at Olympic Park station
