= King Living =

Australian furniture company

- Formerly: King Furniture
- Type: Private (family-owned)
- Industry: Furniture design, manufacture, and retail
- Founded: 1977; 49 years ago in Sydney, Australia
- Founders: David King; Gwen King
- Headquarters: Sydney, Australia
- Areas served: Australia; Canada; China; Malaysia; New Zealand; Singapore; United Kingdom; United States
- Key people: David King (Director); David Woollcott (CEO)
- Products: Sofas; chairs; tables; bedroom furniture
- Owner: King family
- Website: kingliving.com

King Living is an Australian furniture manufacturer and retailer founded in 1977 in Sydney by David King and his mother, Gwen King. The company designs, manufactures and retails modular sofas and other furniture, and operates showrooms in Australia and select international markets including Canada, China, Malaysia, New Zealand, Singapore, the United Kingdom, and the United States.

== History ==
King Living was established by David King, who initially made foam furniture with his mother Gwen in their family home, selling items at Sydney's Paddy's Markets. The company expanded initially in Australia before the first international showrooms were opened in Singapore and New Zealand in 2015. The same year, the company rebranded from “King Furniture” to King Living. Other international markets were opened in subsequent years.

== Operations ==
The company manufactures and retails a range of furniture products and employs a vertically integrated model, overseeing design, production, distribution, and retail. Manufacturing was moved from Australia to Shanghai in 1995; and subsequently to Thailand.

== Awards and recognition ==
The company received recognition in design and innovation, including Red Dot Design Awards, iF Design Awards, and Australian Design Awards.
