= Sydney Markets =

Markets in Sydney, Australia

Coordinates: 33.8616°S 151.0704°E

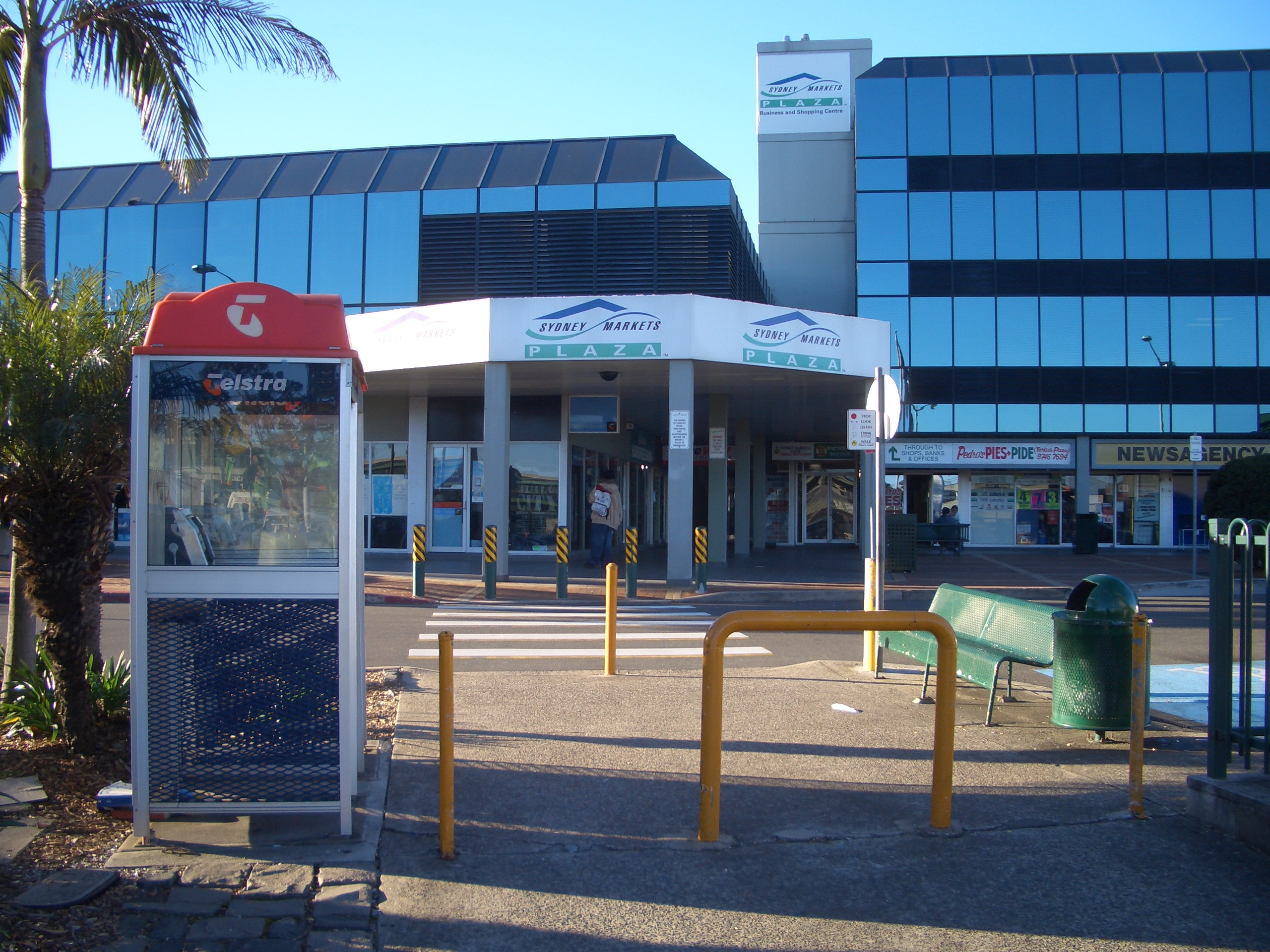
Sydney Markets Plaza

The Sydney Markets (also known as the Flemington Markets or Homebush West Markets) are a group of wholesale and retail markets in Sydney, New South Wales, Australia. The Sydney Markets are located in the Inner West suburb of Flemington, New South Wales, 16 kilometres west of the Sydney central business district. Flemington is in the local government area of the Municipality of Strathfield. The market is the primary distribution hub of fresh produce, flowers and other food products for Sydney. The market has a wholesale sales section that caters to larger businesses and general sales to the public. The market is the central marketplace for Sydney's farmers to sell their products. It has a history dating back to 1788. The operator of the markets is Sydney Markets Limited, formerly the Sydney Markets Authority, but privatised in 1997. As well as the markets at Flemington, Sydney Markets Limited also operates the inner city Paddy's Market in Haymarket.

Sydney Markets feature a number of divisions including Produce, Flowers, Growers, Fresh Food, Motor, Swap & Sell, Paddy's Markets and Sydney Markets Plaza.

Paddy's Markets specialises in the sale of fruit, vegetables, fish, clothes, giftware and souvenirs to the general public. The Flower Market is the central provider of flowers to Sydney's florists. The Produce, Growers and Fresh Food Markets are the central provider to Sydney's grocery shops. The Swap & Sell market is a second hand market, where vendors set up a sales stand selling a range of second-hand goods. The Motor Market provides a site for private sellers to show their cars for sale.

Sydney Markets Plaza features a supermarket, hotel, post office and many specialty shops below an office building.

Sydney Markets has its own postcode, 2129, separate from the 2140 postcode used for the remainder of Flemington. The Sydney Markets post office was previously known as "Flemington Markets", but changed its name in the late 1990s.

== Transport ==
Flemington railway station is on the Inner West & Leppington Line of the Sydney Trains network, and the concourse is connected to the markets by a pedestrian overpass. Vehicle entrances to the markets are located on Homebush Bay Drive and Parramatta Road.

Goods sidings were originally provided for the market immediately to the north of Flemington station. These have been decommissioned, and the tracks to the north of the station are mainly used for freight train through-traffic travelling between the Main North railway line and the Enfield intermodal freight depot further south.

== History ==
The site of the markets at Flemington was originally a land grant of 200 acres (0.81 km^{2}) to John Fleming in 1806. The part of Fleming's estate south of the railway was acquired by the Underwood estate and subdivided for residential development in 1882. This suburb, called "Flemington", was incorporated into the Municipality of Strathfield in 1892, after which it was generally listed in directories under "Strathfield". This part of the estate is today partly in the suburb of Strathfield and partly in the modern suburb of Flemington. North of the railway, the bush was turned into paddocks and from 1883 Fleming's estate north of the railway was the site of a cattle saleyard. This area became part of the Municipality of Strathfield in 1947.

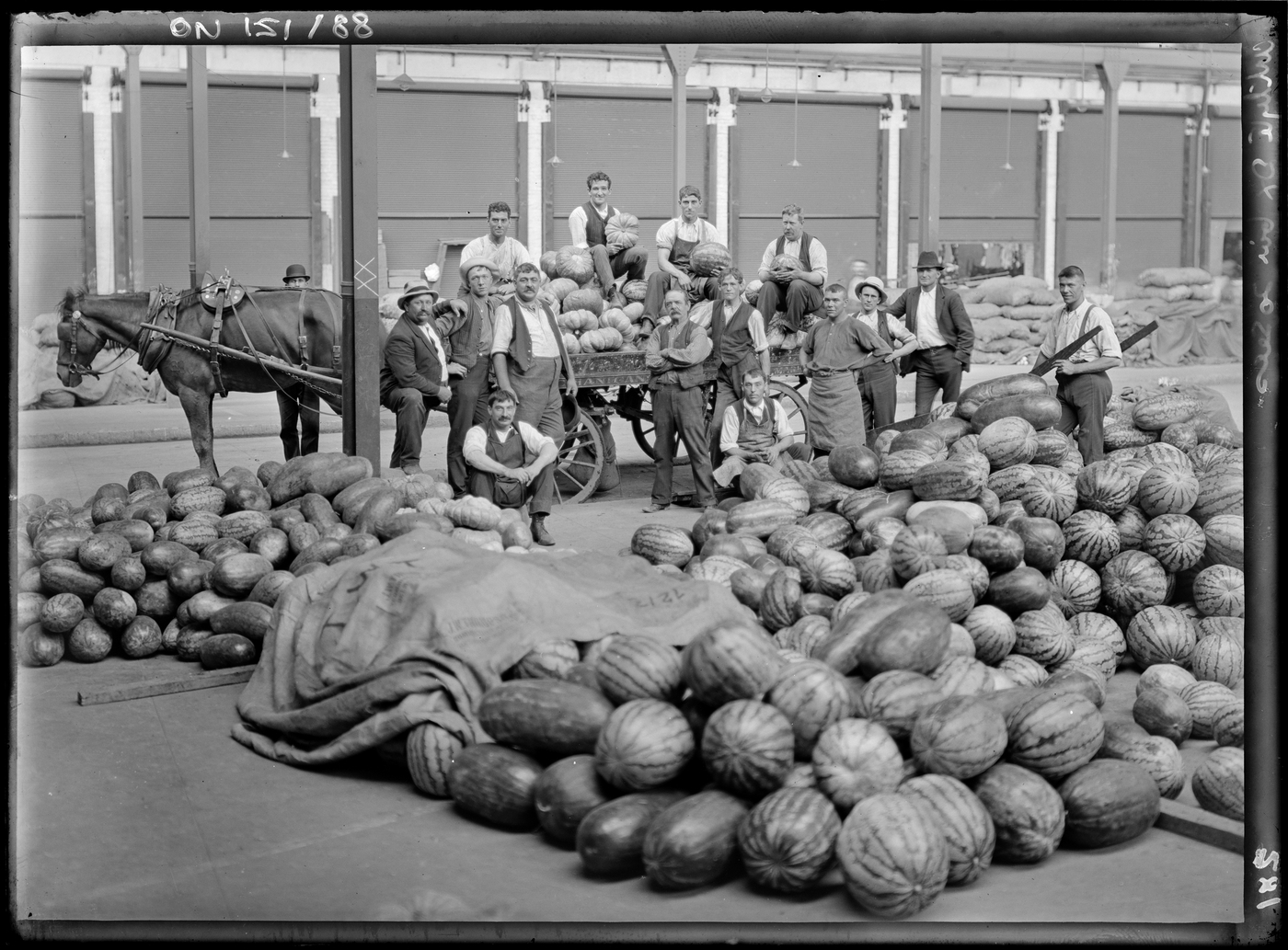
Water melon sellers, Sydney Markets, c. 1910, by Rex Hazlewood

Sydney Markets Limited claims its origin from the informal markets formed at The Rocks with the first European settlement in 1788. However, the first organised market was not formed until 1806, and the Sydney Central Markets were established in 1810, which is today the Queen Victoria Building. In 1829, cattle and corn markets were established further south, below Brickfield Hill and immediately to the south of the Sydney Central Business District. The area became known as "the Haymarket". The cattle market was moved to successively sites further west, eventually moving to Flemington in 1883. The Corporation of Sydney, upon incorporation in 1842, took control of the markets. In 1869, the Belmore Markets was built on the old cattle market site at Haymarket as a fruit and vegetable market, supplemented by the Paddy's Market building on the old hay market site. In 1892-3 a new Belmore Markets building was erected, but was later turned into a circus and theatre, now the Capitol Theatre. Paddy's Market was redeveloped as Market City, completed in 1997. After temporarily moving to Redfern to make way for the development works, Paddy's Market resumed trading at Market City in 1993.

On 12 September 1975, Flemington Markets was opened by State Governor Roden Cutler relieve the Paddy's Markets at Haymarket. After the relocation of the markets, "Flemington" was gazetted as an official suburb in 1977 (prior to this, the residential part of the suburb had been part of Strathfield). The suburb name was re-gazetted with a new official name of "Homebush West" in 1992, after which the name "Flemington" was officially limited to an urban place located in a small unpopulated strip of the suburb within Cumberland Council. Nevertheless, the markets continue to be commonly known as "Flemington Markets" rather than "Homebush West Markets", and the suburb remains commonly referred to as "Flemington" rather than "Homebush West", even in official contexts. Sydney Markets Limited purchased the land and infrastructure at Flemington from the New South Wales Government in 2002.

Paddy's Market was redeveloped as Market City, completed in 1997. After temporarily moving to Redfern to make way for the development works, Paddy's Market resumed trading at Market City in 1993. The Sydney Markets Authority, privatised in 1997 as Sydney Markets Limited, continues to operate both the Flemington and Haymarket markets.

== Gallery ==
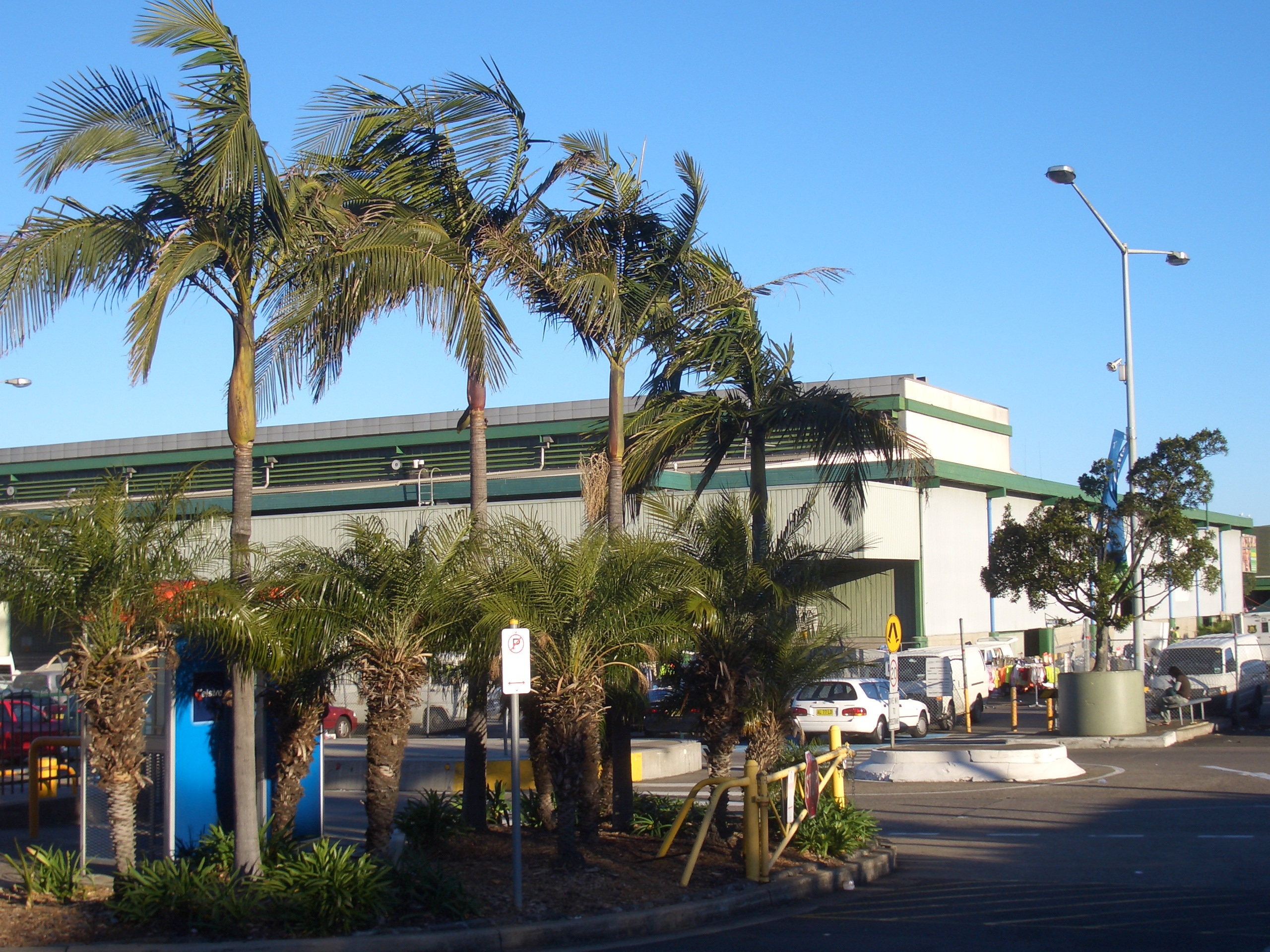
Paddy's Markets

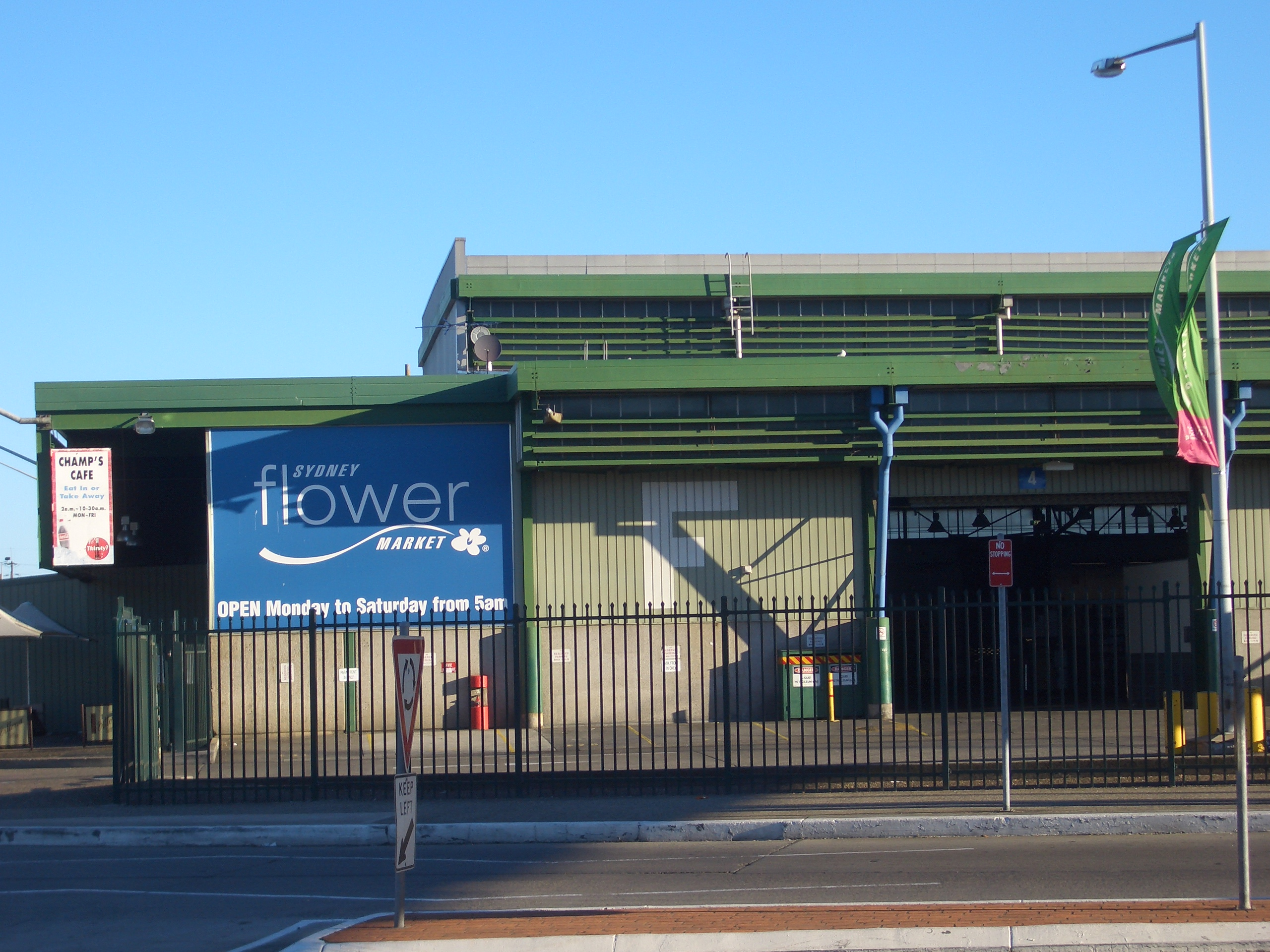
Flower Markets

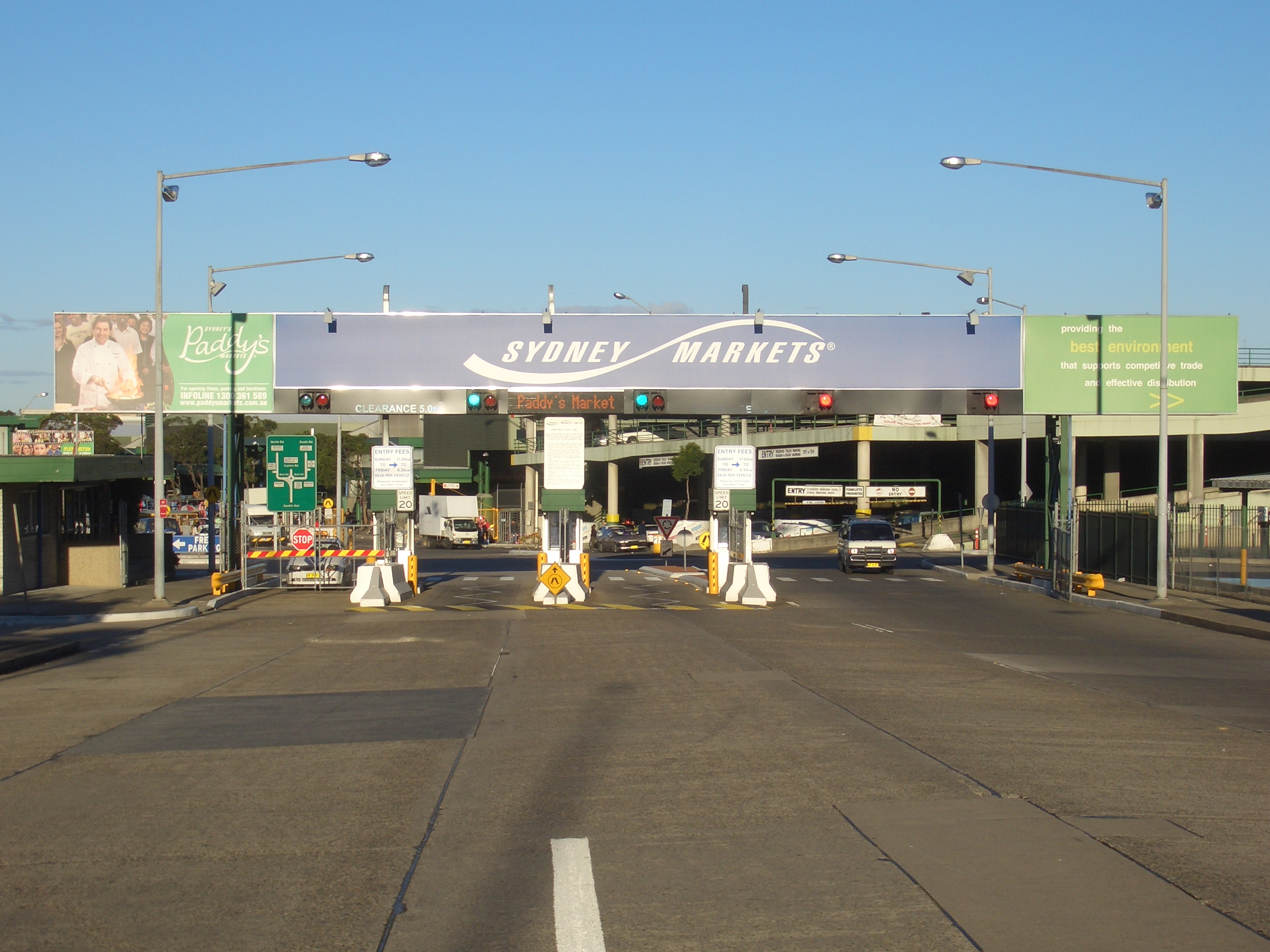
Sydney Markets Homebush Bay Drive entrance

== See also ==
- List of markets in Sydney
