= List of markets in Sydney =

Markets in Sydney offer an extensive range of produce and both new and second-hand merchandise. There are both outdoor and covered markets in Sydney, New South Wales, Australia.

== City (Central Sydney) ==
Market	Website	Location		Frequency	Goods	Other notes
Market	Website	Suburb	Address	Frequency	Goods	Other notes
Paddy's Markets		Haymarket	Chinatown, 9-13 Hay Street	Every Wednesday to Sunday, 10 am – 6 pm	Fashion and accessories, sporting goods, fresh fruits and vegetables, pet supplies, clothing, electrical goods, arts and crafts, and souvenirs	Part of Sydney Markets at Flemington; markets cater for both locals and tourists and are home to over 1,000 stalls
The Rocks Friday Foodie Markets		The Rocks	George Street, Playfair Street and Jack Mundey Place, at the northern end of George Street	Every Friday nights	Food	Under the shadow of the Sydney Harbour Bridge
The Rocks Weekend Markets		The Rocks	George Street, Playfair Street and Jack Mundey Place, at the northern end of George Street	Every Saturday and Sunday	Arts and crafts, produce (farmers' market)	Under the shadow of the Sydney Harbour Bridge
Sydney Fish Market		Pyrmont	Corner of Pyrmont Bridge Road and Bank Street	Every day	Fresh and cooked seafood	

== Sydney suburbs ==
Market	Website	Location		Frequency	Goods	Other notes
Market	Website	Suburb	Address	Frequency	Goods	Other notes
Arcadia Markets		Arcadia	Arcadia Public School, 140 Arcadia Road	Twice-yearly (May and November)	Fresh produce, gourmet food, hand-crafted items, fashion & accessories, homewares, eco-friendly and fair trade items	Pet-friendly; free parking; November market features free rides for children and the Old Skool at School car show
Balmain Markets		Balmain	St Andrews Congregational Church Balmain, Corner of Darling and Curtis Road	Every Saturday		Third-oldest in Sydney
The Beaches Market		Warriewood	Pittwater Park, 1472 Pittwater Road	Every Friday, 8 am – 1 pm	Fresh produce from farms all over NSW, meat, seafood, dairy products, deli items, plants and flowers; fashion; artisan stalls; a wide choice of hot food	100 stalls; also offers children's entertainment
Bella Vista Farm Markets		Bella Vista	Bella Vista Farm Park	First Sunday of each month		20 acres; Australia's first merino sheep farm; location includes towering Bunya pine trees and the ever-changing views across the Sydney Basin
Berowra Fine Food, Wine & Handcraft Markets		Berowra	Corner of The Gully Road and Berowra Waters Road	First and third Sunday of each month, 9 am – 2 pm	Fresh produce, meat, seafood, dairy products, deli items, plants and flowers and hot food	
Blacktown Markets		Prospect	Greater Union Drive-In Theatre, Cricketers Arms Road	Every Sunday		
Bondi Beach Market		Bondi Beach	Roscoe Street	• Every Saturday and Sunday, 12:20 pm – 7 pm (March – April; September – November) • Every Friday – Tuesday, 12:20 pm – 9 pm (December – February) • 7 days a week (Christmas and New Year fortnight)	Jewellery, sunglasses and other beach attire	Beachside market in the heart of Bondi near Hurricane's Restaurant; run by volunteers, with all profits donated to local charities
Bondi Markets		Bondi Beach	Bondi Beach Public School, Campbell Parade	Every Sunday		
Bundeena Markets		Bundeena	• Summers Reserve (shine) • Bundeena Public School (rain)	First Sunday of each month	Ceramics, photography and jewellery from local artisans; food and spices	
Carriageworks Farmers Markets		Carriageworks	243 Wilson Street	Every Saturday, 8 am – 1 pm		
Cherrybrook Markets		Cherrybrook	Cherrybrook Technology High School, Purchase Road	Fourth Saturday of each month		
Como Markets		Como	Como Public School	Second Sunday of each month	Arts and craft, food	
Cooks River Markets		Croydon Park	Picken Oval and Magpie Sports Club, 40 Hampton Street	Last Sunday of each month		
Double Bay Market		Double Bay	Guildfoyle Park	Every Thursday	Fresh fruit & veg, meat, eggs, bread, etc.	Farmers market
Dural Village Markets		Dural - Sydney NSW	Dural Country Club - Old Northern Road Dural	2nd Sunday of the month 9am - 1pm	Artisans, Growers and produce, Food, Coffee - quality stalls hand picked and curated	
East Lindfield Village Markets		East Lindfield Community Hall	East Lindfield Community Hall 9 Wellington Road East Lindfield	Third Sunday of the month	Artisans, Food, produce, coffee	
Eveleigh – Rootstock Sydney		Eveleigh	Carriageworks, 243 Wilson Street	Annually in February	Wine, food, brews, music and arts	Artisan and sustainable festival
Fairfield Markets		Prairiewood		Every Saturday, 9 am – 4 pm		
Glebe Markets		Glebe	Glebe Public School, 9–25 Derwent Street (via Glebe Point Road)	Every Saturday		
Hornsby Market		Hornsby	Florence and Hunter Street Mall	Every Thursday, 9:00 am – 2:30 pm	Fresh fruit & veg, meat, eggs, bread, etc.	Farmers Market
Kings Cross Market		Potts Point	Fitzroy Gardens, 60–64 Macleay Street, Kings Cross	Every Saturday	Fresh fruit & veg, meat, eggs, bread, etc.	Farmers Market
Kings Cross Sunday Market		Potts Point	Fitzroy Gardens, 60–64 Macleay Street, Kings Cross	Every Sunday	Fresh fruit & veg, meat, eggs, bread, etc.	Farmers Market
Kirribilli General Market		Milsons Point	Bradfield Park, Corner of Alfred & Burton Streets	Second Sunday of each month		
Kirribilli Art, Design & Fashion Markets		Milsons Point	Bradfield Park, Corner of Alfred & Burton Streets	• Fourth Saturday of the month (January – November) • First and third Saturday (December)		
Lane Cove Farmers and Produce Market		Lane Cove	Lane Cove Public School, 145 Longueville Road	Every Sunday, 8:30 am – 1 pm	Fresh produce, meat, seafood, dairy products, deli items, plants and flowers and hot food	
Leichhardt Organic Farmers Market		Leichhardt	Orange Grove Public School, Corner of Perry Street & Balmain Road	Every Saturday, 8 am to 1 pm	Fresh fruit & veg, meat, eggs, bread, etc.	Farmers Market
Lindfield Market: TGM (That Great Market)		Lindfield	9 Wellington Street	Third Sunday of each month (February – December)		
Liverpool Markets		Liverpool	2–18 Orange Grove Road	Every Saturday and Sunday, 8:30 am – 4:30 pm		Over 200 stalls under one air-conditioned roof; free entry; free parking
"Lonely Hunter" Indie Design Markets		Newtown	Newtown Social Club, King Street	Last Saturday of each month	Fashion, accessories, art, stationery and textiles from emerging local designers	
Manly Village Public School Markets		Manly	Manly Village Public School, Corner of Darley Road & Wentworth Street	Third Saturday of each month		
Manly Markets		Manly	The Corso, Sydney Road	Every Saturday and Sunday		
Market by the River		Ermington	Halvorsen Park	First Saturday of each month, 9 am – 2 pm	Fine foods, artisan goods and handmade	
Marrickville Organic Food and Farmers Markets		Marrickville	142 Addison Road	Every Sunday, 10:00 am – 3 pm	Fresh fruit & veg, meat, eggs, bread, etc.	Farmers Market
Mona Vale Market		Mona Vale	Pittwater RSL, Mona Vale	Every Sunday, 8:30 am to 1 pm	Fresh fruit & veg, meat, eggs, bread, etc.	Farmers Market
Mona Vale Twilight Markets		Mona Vale	Village Park, Park Street	First Friday of each month (March, April, September, October and December), 5 pm – 9 pm	Food and live music; jumping castle for children	
Moore Park Produce Market		Moore Park	The Entertainment Quarter	Every Wednesday and Saturday, 8 am – 2 pm		The market aims to connect customers directly with the best NSW growers, producers, chefs and artisans; free cooking workshops are hosted every Wednesday at 11 am by some of Sydney's best chefs
Mosman Market		Mosman	1110 Middle Head Road, Middle Head	Wednesday, Parramatta Road; 9.00 am – 2:00 pm		Next to Middle Head Cafe
Narrabeen Markets		Narrabeen	Berry Reserve, Pittwater Road near Narrabeen Lakes	Third Sunday of each month		
North Rocks Markets		North Rocks	North Rocks Institute for Deaf and Blind Children, 361–365 North Rocks Road	Every Sunday morning 8am - 1pm	Mix of old and new; antiques to clothing and toys; coffee and baked goods	Run by the local Rotary Club of Carlingford; a coin donation is expected upon entry with all proceeds going to charity
Northside Produce Markets		North Sydney	Civic Park, 200 Miller Street	First and third Saturday of each month, 8:00 am – 12:00 pm	Fresh produce, including organic meat and vegetables, artisan cheeses, sourdough and spelt breads, fresh pasta, seafood, smallgoods, cider, wine and coffee	Knife sharpening by Vicki. Regular, free bicycle check-ups (see website for dates) Rain, hail and shine. Free parking at Ridge Street Parking. Grassed area - kid and dog friendly - and a great place to eat your egg and bacon roll or fresh pastry.
Orange Grove Market		Lilyfield	Orange Grove Public School, Corner of Perry Street and Balmain Road, Orange Grove	Every Saturday	Fresh fruit & veg, meat, eggs, bread, etc.	Farmers Market
Paddington Markets		Paddington	Paddington Uniting Church, 395 Oxford Street	Every Saturday, 10 am – 4 pm	Clothes, artwork, bric-a-brac, books, jewellery, pottery, fragrances and produce	250 stalls
Palm Beach Market		Palm Beach	Governor Phillip Park, Barrenjoey Road	Fourth Sunday of each month, 9 am – 3 pm		
Parklea Markets		Parklea	Sunnyholt Road	Every day		
Penrith Showground Markets		Penrith	Penrith Paceway, Station Street	Every Wednesday		
Rozelle Collectors Market		Rozelle	Rozelle Public School, 663 Darling Street	Every Saturday, 9 am – 3 pm	Second-hand goods, bric-a- brac and antiques	
Seaforth Market		Seaforth	Blagowlah RSL, Seaforth	Every Sunday, 8 am to 12:30 pm	Fresh fruit & veg, meat, eggs, bread, etc.	Farmers Market
South Sydney Industrial Markets		Alexandria	75-85 O'Riordan Street	Every Sunday, 10 am – 3pm		
St Ives Heritage Craft Fair Markets		St Ives	St Ives Showground, Mona Vale Road	First Sunday of each month		
Surry Hills Markets		Surry Hills	Shannon Reserve, Corner of Crown & Collins Streets	First Saturday of each month		
Sydney Markets		Flemington	250–318 Parramatta Road	Every day	Produce, flowers, growers, fresh food, motor, swap and sell	Wholesale
Willoughby Market: TGM (That Great Market)		Willoughby	Club Willoughby, 26 Crabbes Avenue	Every second Sunday, 9 am – 2 pm	Fashion, arts and hot food	
Sydney Vegan Market		Moore Park	The Market Entertainment Quarter; 122 Lang Road	Third Sunday of each month	Vegan produce	
Blak Markets		La Perouse	La Perouse Public School, Corner of Bunnerong & Yarra Roads		Aboriginal and Torres Strait Islander goods	
Cambridge Markets Entertainment Quarter		Moore Park	Entertainment Quarter, 122 Lang Road	Every Wednesday and Saturday, 8 am – 2 pm	Produce	

== Gallery ==
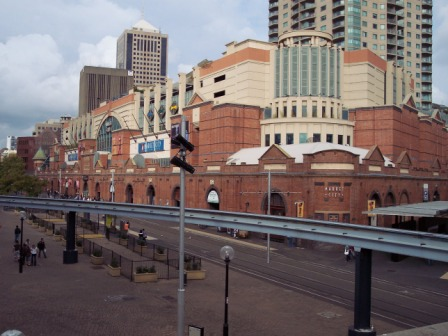
Paddy's Markets

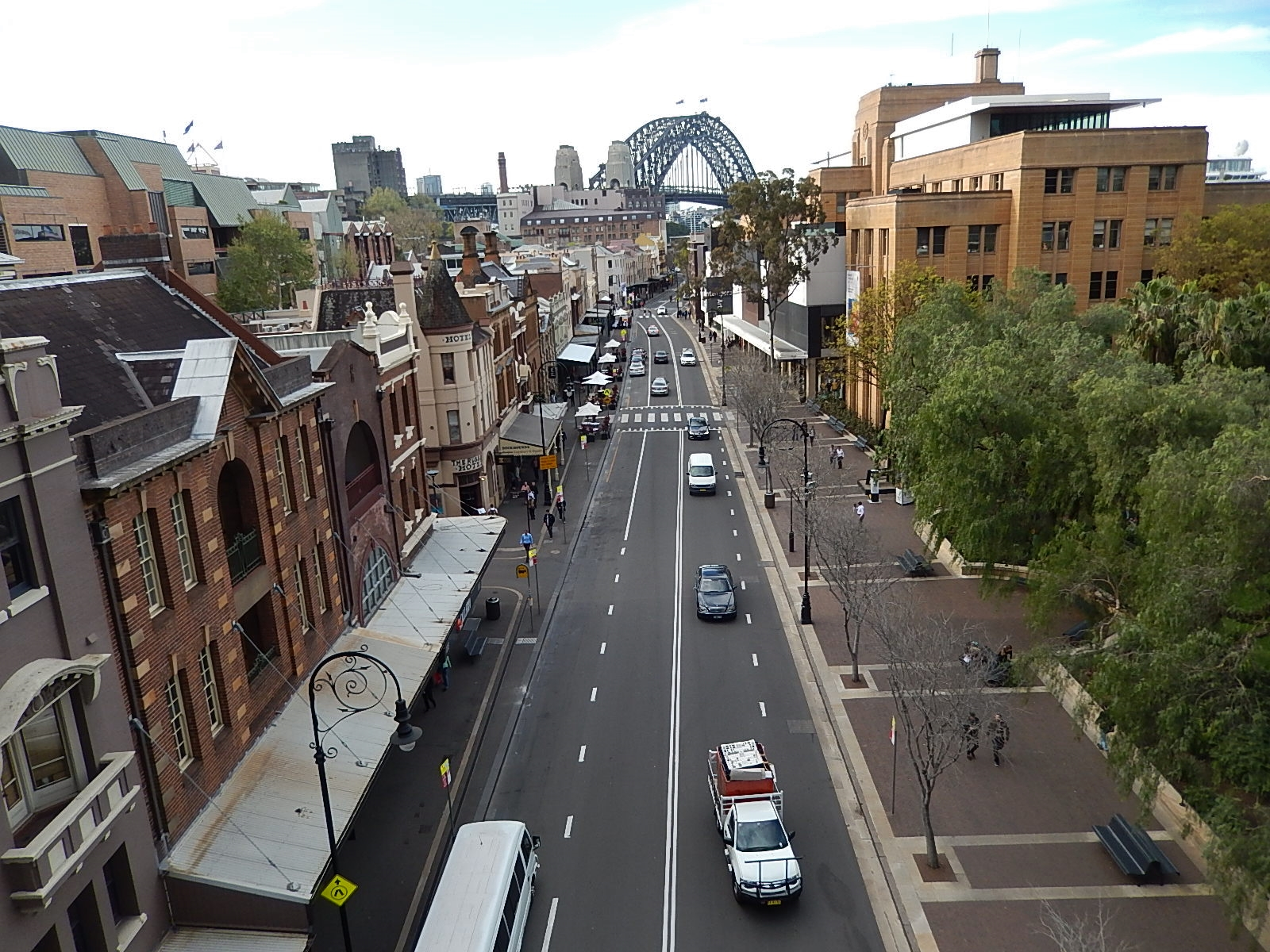
The Rocks Markets

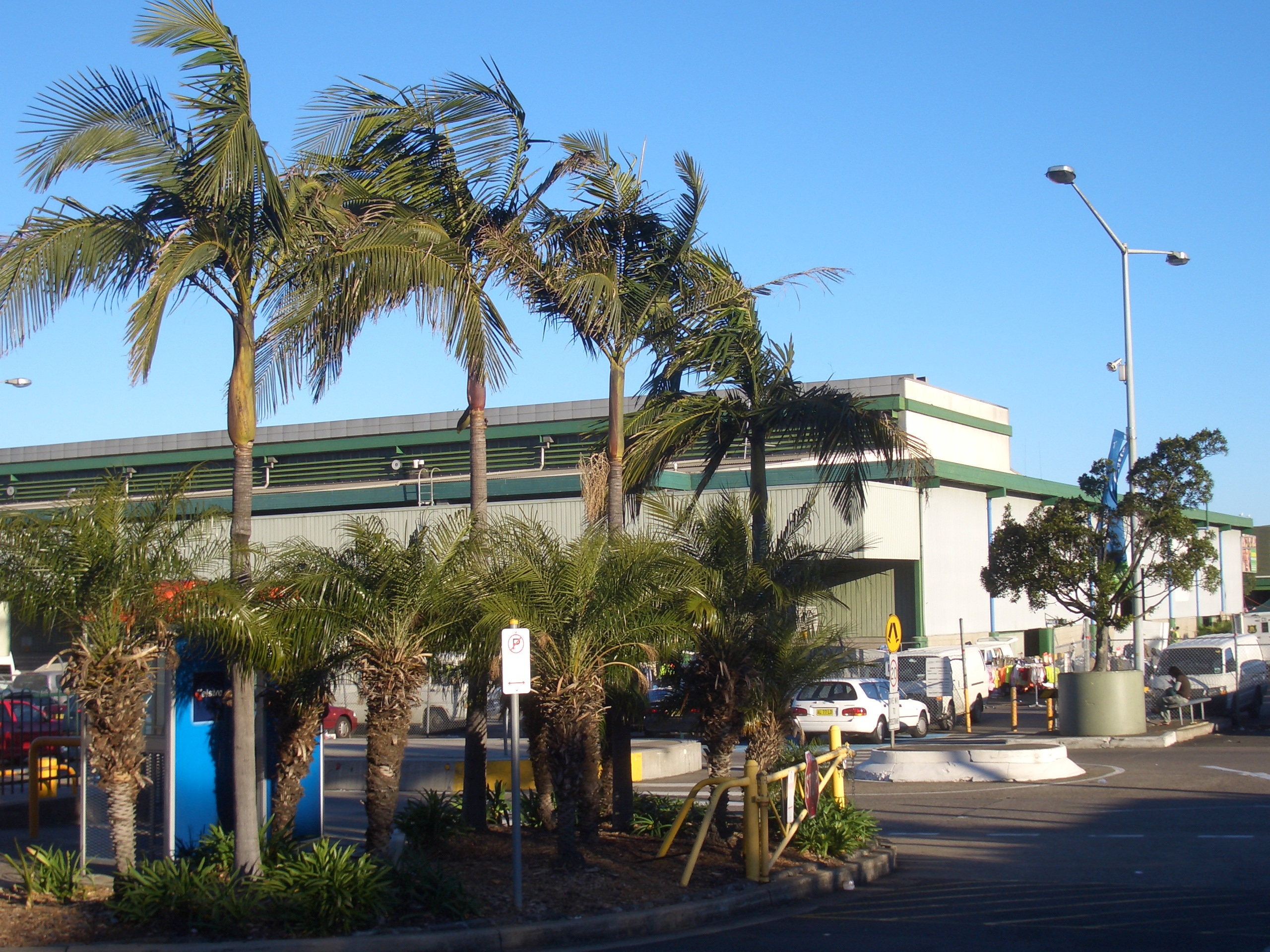
Sydney Markets

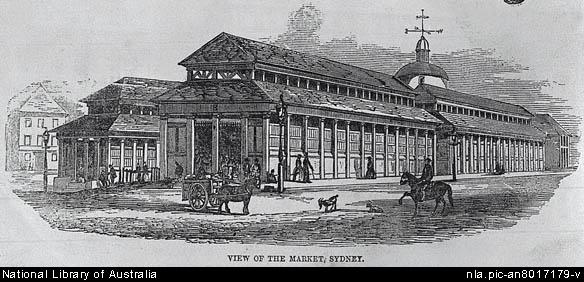
Sydney Market (1857)
