= Sydney Fish Market =

Major fish market in Sydney, New South Wales, Australia

Coordinates: 33°52′21.87″S 151°11′31.77″E

- Location: Glebe, New South Wales, Australia
- Opening date: 1966
- Closing date: 2026 (original building)
- Developer: UrbanGrowth NSW (Bays Precinct urban renewal program)
- Management: Sydney Fish Market Pty Ltd
- Owner: Catchers Trust of N.S.W. Sydney Fish Market Tenants and Merchants Pty Ltd
- Environment: Indoor and outdoor promenade
- Goods sold: Fresh seafood; yabbies; delicatessen items; sushi; baked goods; fruits and vegetables; meat
- Total retail floor area: 35,000 m² (total complex); 15,500 m² (retail space)
- Website: www.sydneyfishmarket.com.au
- Interactive map of Sydney Fish Market

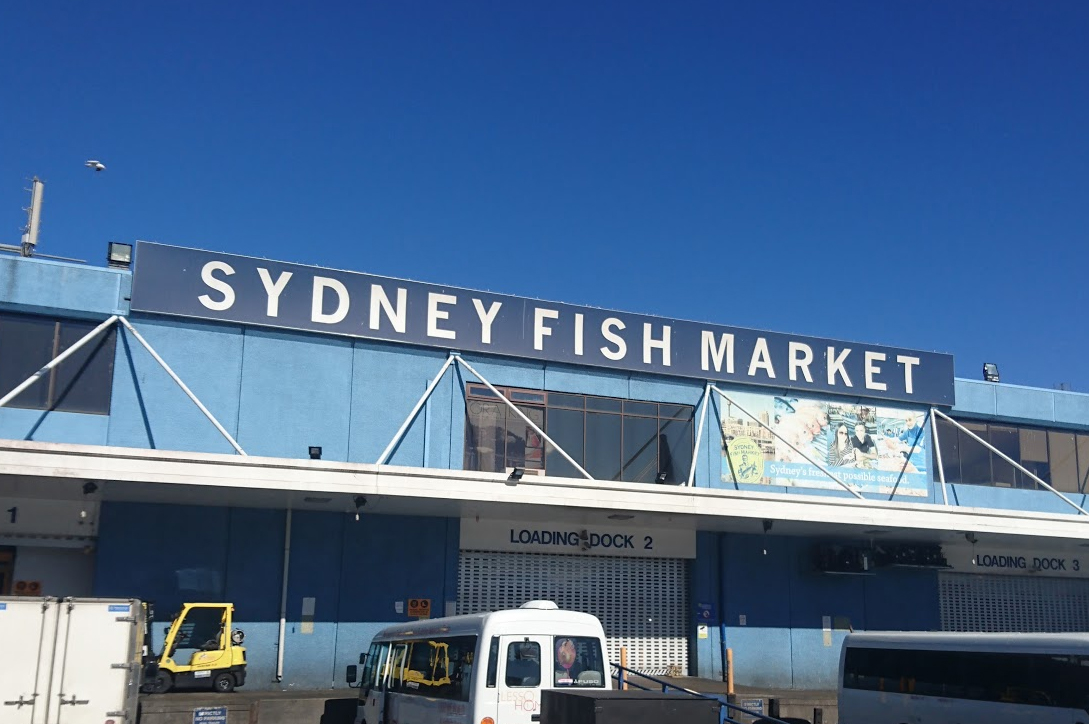
The old Sydney Fish Market

The Sydney Fish Market is a fish market in Sydney, New South Wales, Australia. The market formerly sat on the Blackwattle Bay foreshore in Pyrmont from 1966 to 2026, 2 kilometres (1.2 mi) west of the Sydney central business district, it has been relocated to Glebe, New South Wales since 2026. It is the world's third largest fish market.

== Features ==
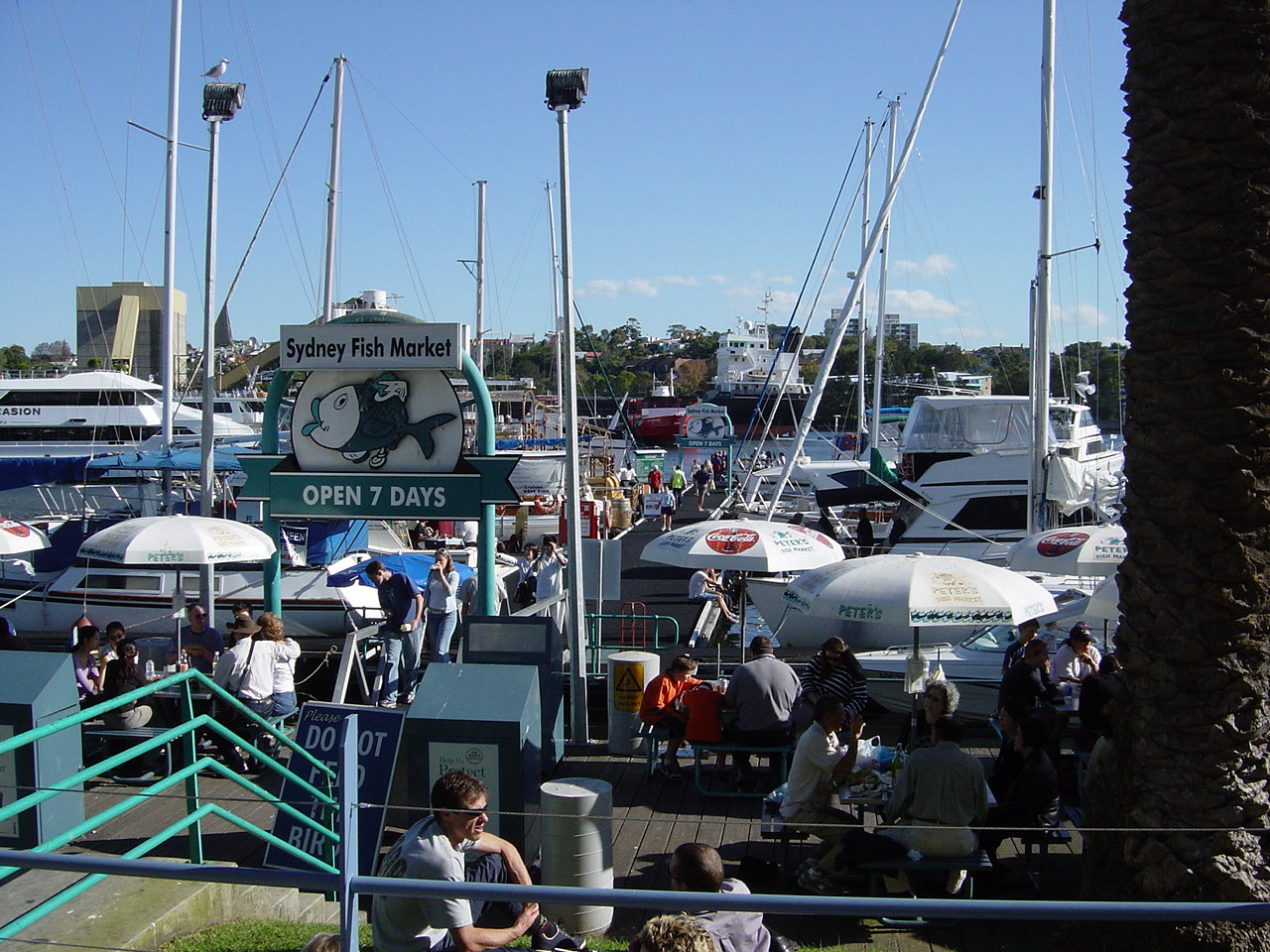
Terrace next to the port

Sydney Fish Market incorporates a working fishing port, wholesale fish market, fresh seafood retail market, a delicatessen, a sushi bar, a bakery, a gift shop, a fruit and vegetable market, a new meat deli, a beverage outlet, a seafood cooking school, indoor seating and an outdoor promenade for visitors. There are even some fish markets where yabbies can be sold live. There are daily wholesale auctions for Sydney's seafood retailers. Since 1995, the markets have been open continuously over a 36-hour period stretching from 5am AEDST on 23 December to 5pm AEDST on Christmas Eve each year that is known as the 'Seafood Marathon'.

== History ==
=== Earlier fish markets in Sydney ===
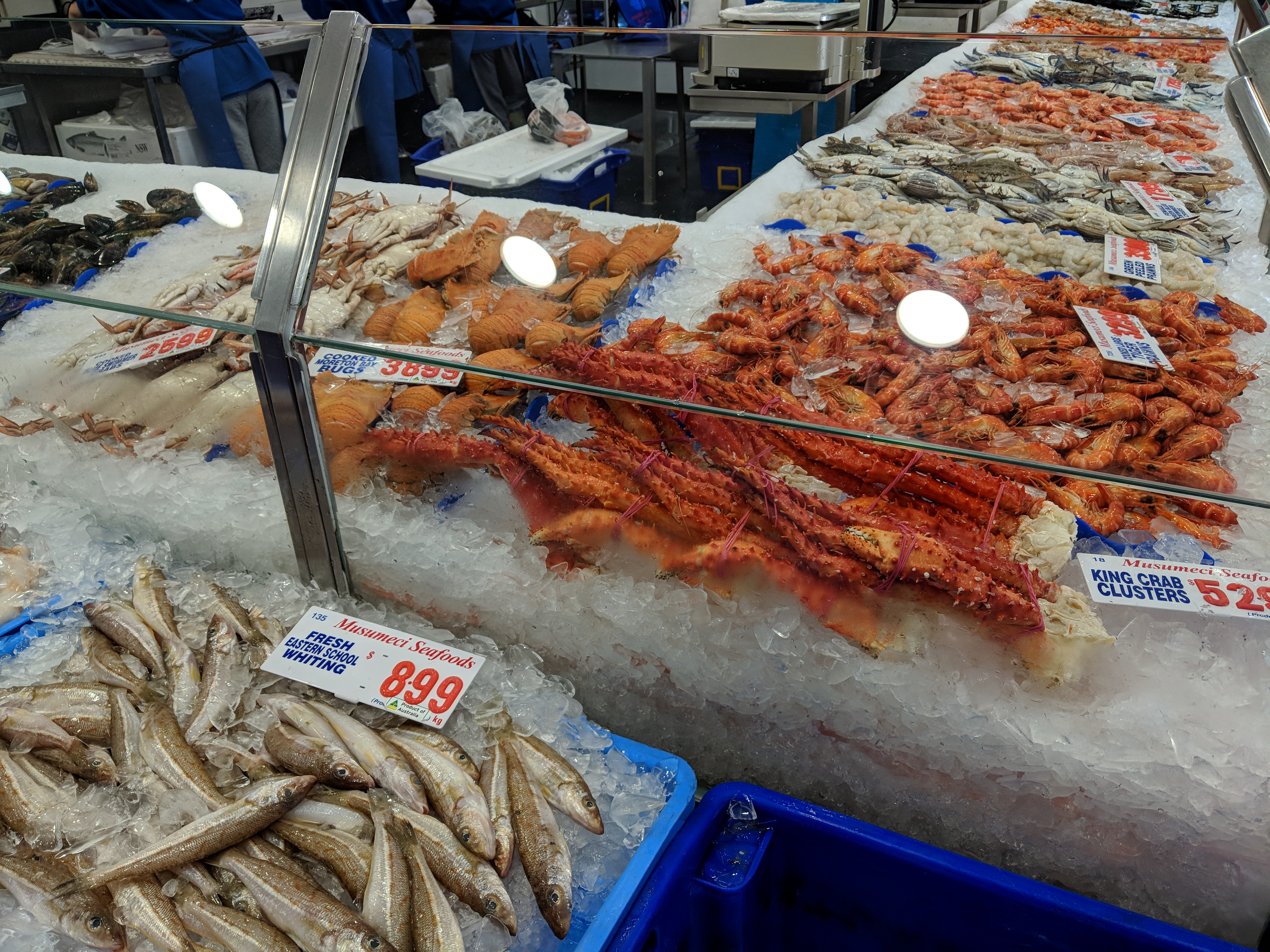
Seafood Display at Sydney Fish Market

The original Fish Market was established, in 1871, at Woolloomooloo, then and for many years later the mooring site of the local Sydney fishing fleet. It expanded over time to occupy the block bounded by Bourke, Plunkett, Forbes and Wilson Streets, Woolloomooloo.

Unhygienic conditions at the Woolloomooloo market and the extension of railways to the coastal areas to the north of Sydney led to the formation, in 1891, of a second, more modern, privately owned fish market—known as the 'Southern Fish Market'—located at Redfern Street, Redfern. In 1892, the Woolloomooloo market was expanded for the last time, then becoming known as the 'Eastern Market'. The Sydney City Council had passed a bylaw requiring that any fish sold in Sydney was first inspected at the Woolloomooloo market, jeopardising the railway-based business model of the Redfern market and its ability to directly market fish from Botany. In 1897, the 'Southern Market' buildings were for sale at auction but the market operations continued, opening a new building in 1903. Around 1907–1908, the Woolloomooloo market was taken over by the Sydney City Council, without compensation; that led to the exodus of some agents to the 'Southern Market', which was further expanded in 1910 after being incorporated as Commonwealth Cooperative Fish Exchange Limited in 1908.

A newer Municipal Fish Market, opened in 1911, at the corner of Thomas and Engine Streets in the Haymarket area; it was also known as the 'City Fish Market'. It was a part of the produce market complex that the Sydney City Council had constructed in the Haymarket. The original market at Woolloomooloo continued to operate, but in a greatly diminished form.

For a time, Sydney had three separate 'fish markets'; the privately owned market at Redfern was in open conflict with the City Council, owner of the 'City' and old Woolloomooloo markets. The council had the backing of the N.S.W. State Government, which passed an Act—The Sydney Corporation (Fish Markets) Act, 1922 (Act No. 39, 1922)—that empowered the City Council to acquire the assets of Commonwealth Cooperative Fish Exchange Limited and to centralise fish marketing operations in Sydney at the Municipal Market.

The end of the 'Southern Market' came in early 1923. The Colonial Secretary of NSW, Charles Oakes, had refused to renew licences of fish agents who operated at the Redfern market and the Fisherman's Union agreed to only supply fish to the 'City Fish Market', which subsequently became a profitable monopoly; that forced the Redfern agents to move to Haymarket and the City Council purchased the disused Redfern market building. The Redfern market building became a hostel for the unemployed during the Great Depression. The dormant 'Eastern Market' site at Woolloomooloo was sold to John Wren in 1926.

The Fish Market remained in Haymarket, until its relocation to Blackwattle Bay in 1966. Before moving to its current location at Glebe in 2026.

=== Market at Blackwattle Bay (1966–2026) ===
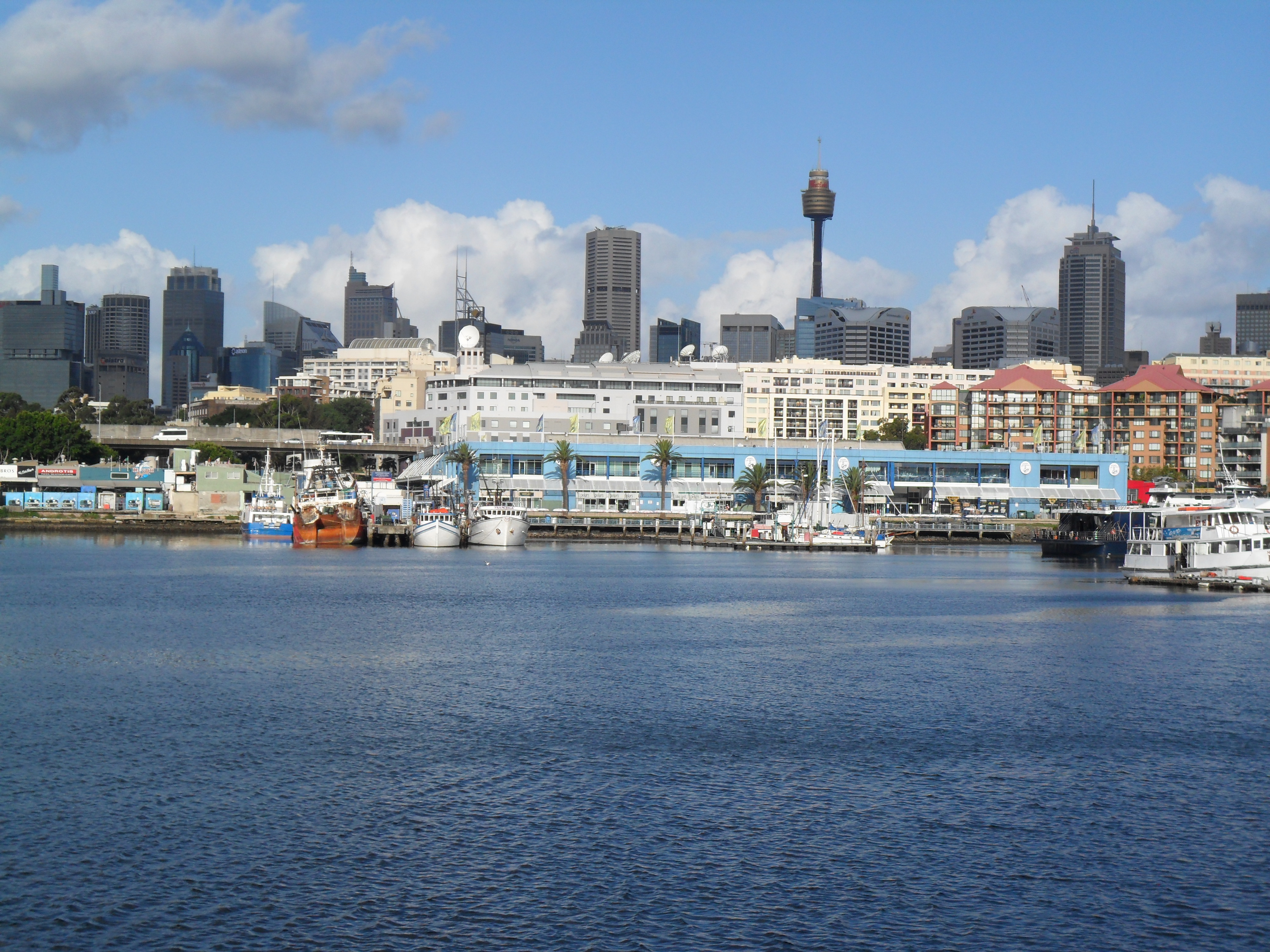
Market viewed from across Blackwattle Bay

The wholesale marketing of fish in Sydney originally was in the hands of licensed agents at Haymarket. At places other than Sydney, unlicensed operators—most typically fishermen's cooperatives—marketed fish. The Fish Marketing Authority was established in 1964, by the NSW State Government, and it established a regulated wholesale market. The new organisation relocated the Fish Market to Blackwattle Bay in 1966.

During the 1980s, new buildings were erected. These both provided an improved auction floor and expanded the secondary role of the Sydney Fish Market as a visitor attraction and retail venue.

Until 1989, fish was sold under a traditional 'voice' auction, to the highest bidder. A computerised Dutch auction system was introduced in October 1989, greatly increasing the efficiency of the sale process.

The Sydney Fish Market was privatised in 1994 as Sydney Fish Market Pty Ltd. This company is owned in equal parts by the harvesting and marketing sectors of the N.S.W. seafood industry—the Catchers Trust of N.S.W. and the Sydney Fish Market Tenants and Merchants Pty Ltd.

Between 1997 and 1999, fish marketing was deregulated in stages and the Sydney Fish Market lost its monopoly in Sydney. However, the efficiency and scale of the auctioning operations at Blackwattle Bay means that a large amount of seafood still goes through the Sydney Fish Market.

=== Current market building at Glebe (2026–present) ===
On 7 November 2016, the New South Wales Government announced the market would move to a new 35,000 square metres complex on an adjacent site. The new complex was proposed to include 15,500 square metres of seafood retail space – compared with 6582 square metres of space for the existing site. On 17 June 2020, the New South Wales Government approved the final plans for the new markets.

The redevelopment forms part of the New South Wales Government's Bays Precinct urban renewal program.

During construction, in September 2023, a crane crashed into the future building. One person was injured.

Completion was scheduled for 2025. However, on 11 October 2025, it was confirmed that the New Sydney Fish Market will open to the public on 19 January 2026. NSW Premier Chris Minns formally opened the new Sydney Fish market on 19 January 2026.

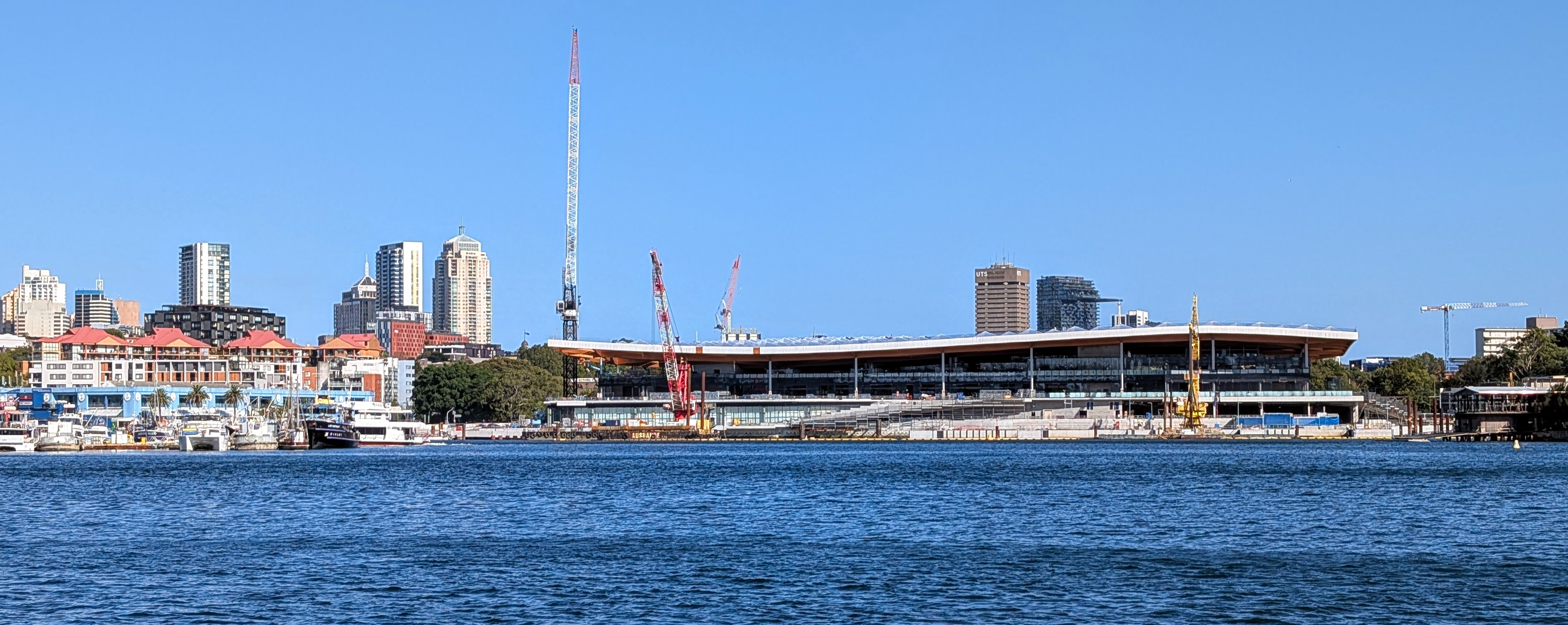
The old (left) and new (centre-right) sites of the Sydney Fish Market in February 2025

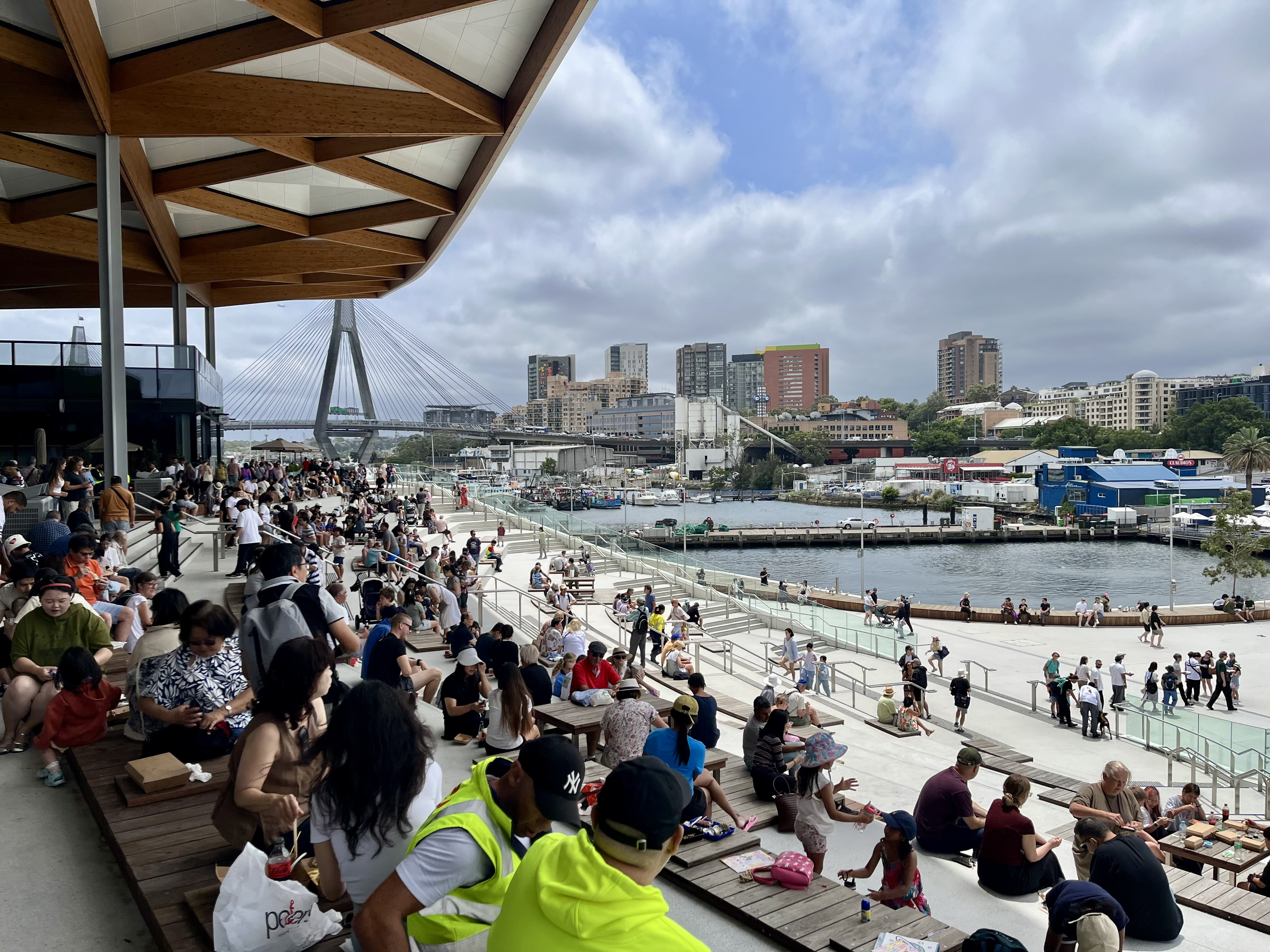
View from Sydney Fish Market 2026

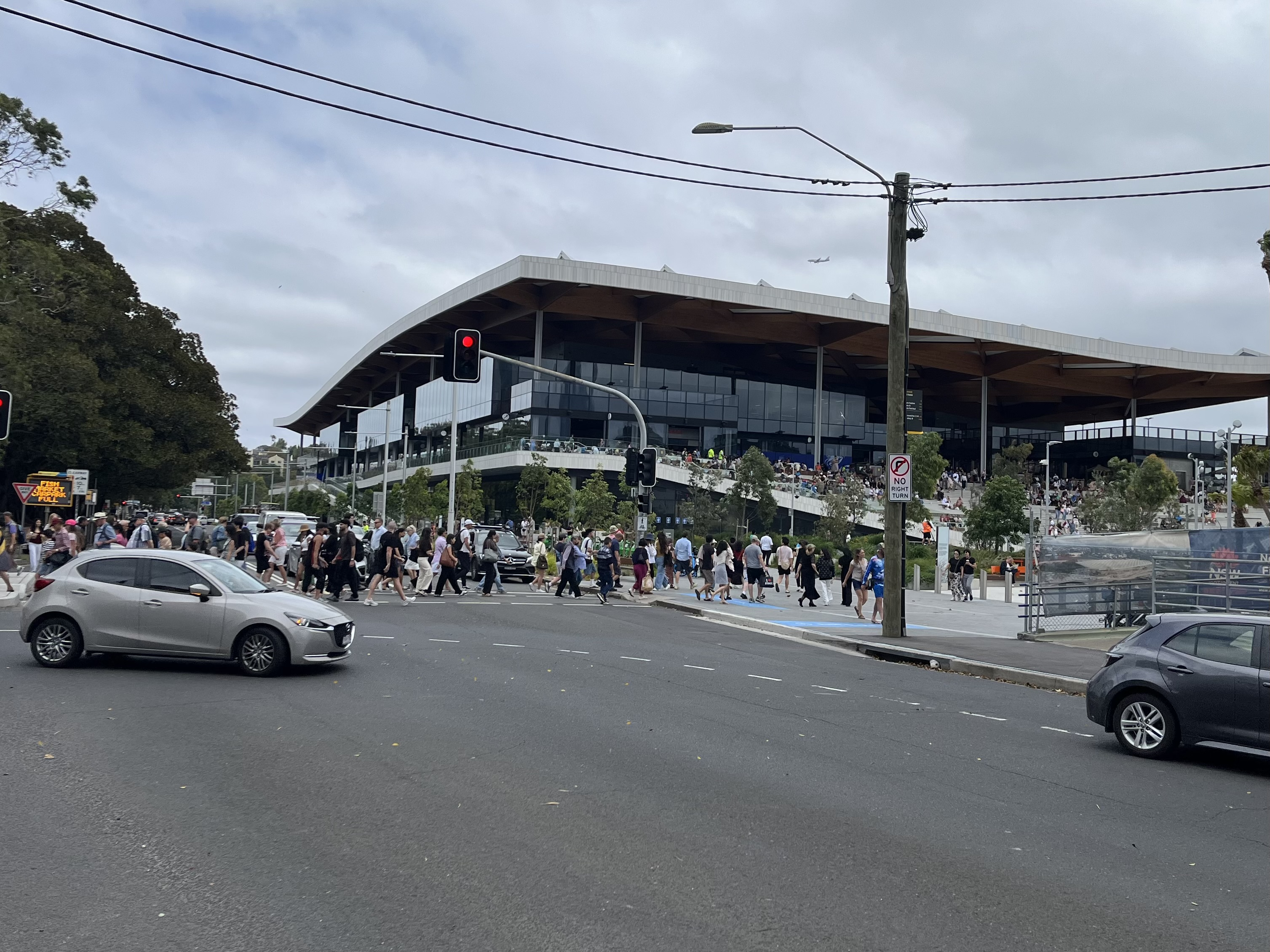
Sydney Fish Market 2026

Western side of the market, 2026

== Mural ==
The mural inside Sydney Fish Market was designed by Australian artist Keith Howland. It is made up of about 400 individually glazed ceramic tiles and measures eight metres long and four metres wide and was installed in 1990. It took the artist about 12 months to complete and it depicts the fishing industry in New South Wales from Yamba on the Far North Coast to Sydney.

== Transport ==
The Bank Street stop on the L1 Dulwich Hill Line is located nearby and formerly served the Fish Market. The market is also served by the 501 bus route. Visitors to the new Sydney Fish Market are expected to use Wentworth Park stop more often.

The Geographical Names Board (GNB) proposed renaming the Fish Market light rail stop to Bank Street to avoid confusion following the opening of the new fish market. This would more accurately reflect the stop's location on Bank Street, rather than implying proximity to the relocated fish market which is closer to Wentworth Park station, and better aligns with the residential development the stop will serve. Fish Market was officially renamed to Bank Street on 19 January 2026, following the opening of the new fish market.

In August 2025, Transport for NSW was requested to automate the signalised pedestrian crossings at the intersection of Bridge Road and Wentworth Park Road. The request was to be evaluated following the opening of the new Fish Markets.

Transport for NSW are delivering a dedicated ferry wharf for the fish market, the new wharf is projected to open in 2027.

== See also ==
- Balmain Bug
- Markets in Sydney
- Sydney Rock Oyster
