= Paddy's Market =

Street market in Glasgow, Scotland

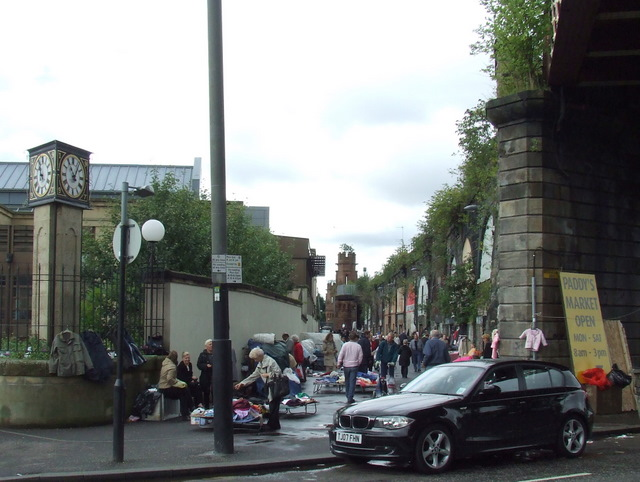
Paddy's Market in 2008 – from geograph.org.uk

Paddy's Market was a historic market on Shipbank Lane in Glasgow, Scotland. It had been in existence at a variety of locations throughout the city for almost 200 years. It was mentioned in newspapers in Britain and Australia in 1849, when a gust of wind blew away clothes at the market.

In its final years, the market had been criticised as being a focus for crime and illegal activity including drug dealing (and the associated crime in stolen goods). However, many traders expressed contempt for the addicts who congregated there and who felt had dragged down the market's reputation.

Paddy's Market was closed by Glasgow City Council on 15 May 2009, when they took over the lease on the current site from Network Rail. The move had been fiercely criticised by many traders who had a procession to the City Chambers.

A proposal was made to reopen the market in 2016, but in 2020 the area was still fenced off and advertised for leasing.

== Name ==
The market's name originated with the large numbers of Irish immigrants who came to Scotland in the early 19th century.

The Liverpool Echo claimed that the Paddy's Market in Banastre Street, Liverpool, originated as St Patrick's Bazaar, for a similar reason and also in the early 19th century.

The name was being used in Melbourne by 1859 and in Wellington by 1867. It was also used in Ipswich, remains in use in Sydney, where Paddy's Market was running by 1909, was in widespread use in New Zealand for many years and was used in Akaroa in 2021.
