= Flemington, New South Wales =

Flemington
- Suburb
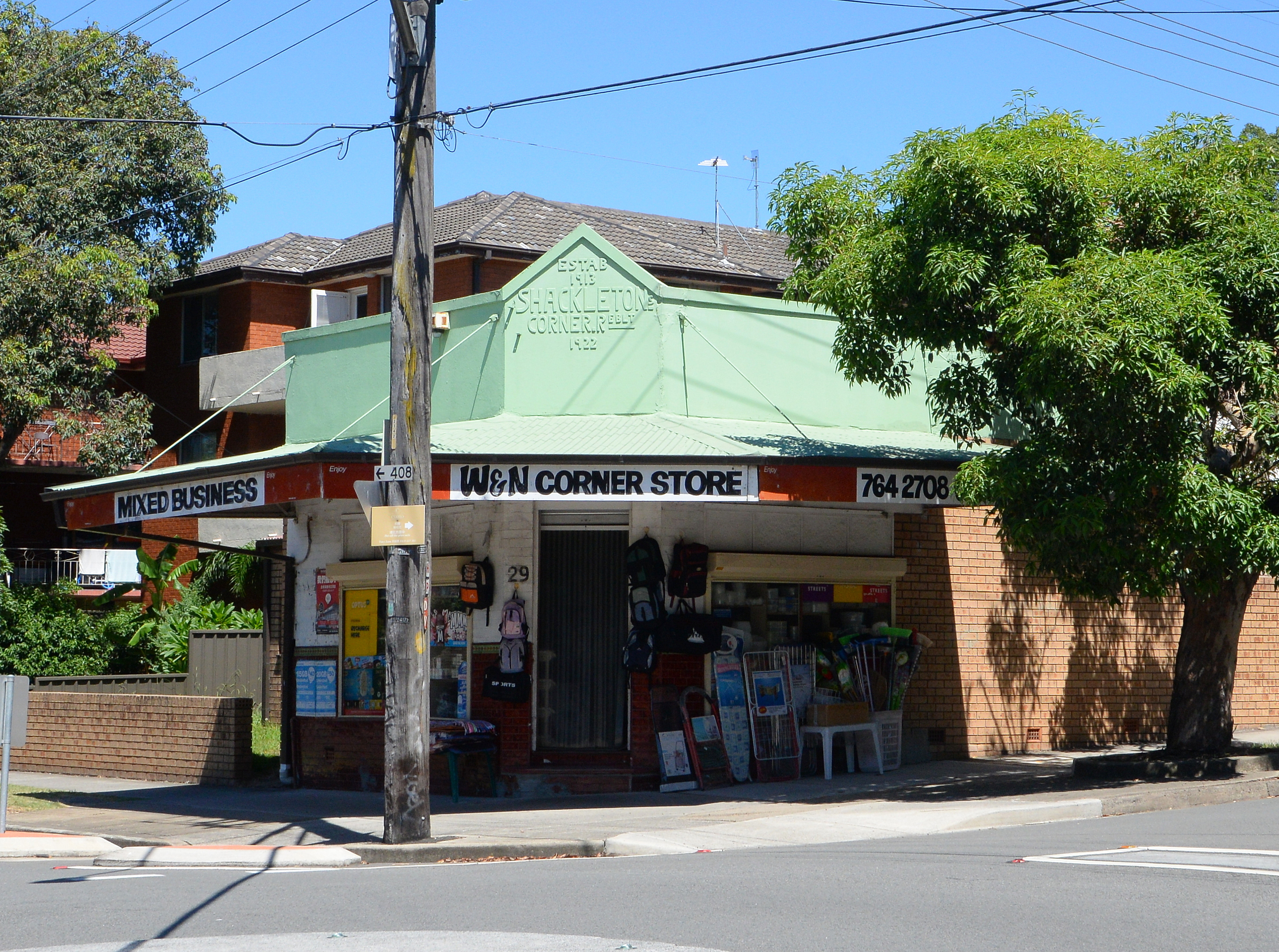
- The W&N Corner Store, originally built in 1922 as Shackleton's Corner

- Interactive map of Flemington
- Country: Australia
- State: New South Wales
- City: Sydney
- LGA: Municipality of Strathfield, Cumberland Council
- Location: 13 km (8.1 mi) west of Sydney CBD

Government
  - State electorate: Strathfield
  - Federal division: Reid

Area
  - Total: 1.7 km^{2} (0.66 sq mi)
- Elevation: 23 m (75 ft)

Population
  - Total: 9,108 (2021 census)
  - Density: 5,360/km^{2} (13,900/sq mi)
- Postcode: 2140 (or 2129)
Suburbs around Flemington
Lidcombe	Sydney Markets	Sydney Olympic Park
Lidcombe	Flemington	Homebush
Rookwood	Strathfield	Homebush

Flemington, officially gazetted as "Homebush West" since 1992, and previously "Strathfield West", is a suburb in the Inner West of Sydney, in the state of New South Wales, Australia. Flemington is located 13 kilometres west of the Sydney central business district, in the local government area of the Municipality of Strathfield, with a small unpopulated area in Cumberland Council.

== Suburb name ==
The suburb is commonly referred to as "Flemington", even in official contexts. The suburb is colloquially known in the local area as "Flemo" and residents known as "Flemos". "Flemington" was the old official name of the suburb, before the residential suburb (south of the railway) was merged into Strathfield in 1892. From 1892, the old Flemington was part of Strathfield. After the establishment of Sydney Markets (commonly known as Flemington Markets) in 1975, "Flemington" was gazetted as an official suburb in 1977. The residential area south of the railway was gazetted as "Strathfield West" until 1992. The modern suburb, under the name "Homebush West", was gazetted in 1992, taking in both "Flemington" and part of "Strathfield West", and re-gazetted with modified boundaries in 1995. Subsequently, "Flemington" became officially an "urban place" confined to a small, unpopulated part of the suburb that is within Cumberland Council. A southern portion of "Strathfield West" became part of the suburb of "Strathfield", resulting in an irregular boundary following individual property lines between "Homebush West" and "Strathfield". The new official name "Homebush West" comes from the separate suburb of Homebush to the east. The new official suburb name is almost never used outside local administrative contexts: Sydney Markets remain known as the "Flemington" markets, the railway station and various organisations and businesses in the suburb still carry the name "Flemington", and most residents and some official sources still refer to the suburb as "Flemington".

== History ==
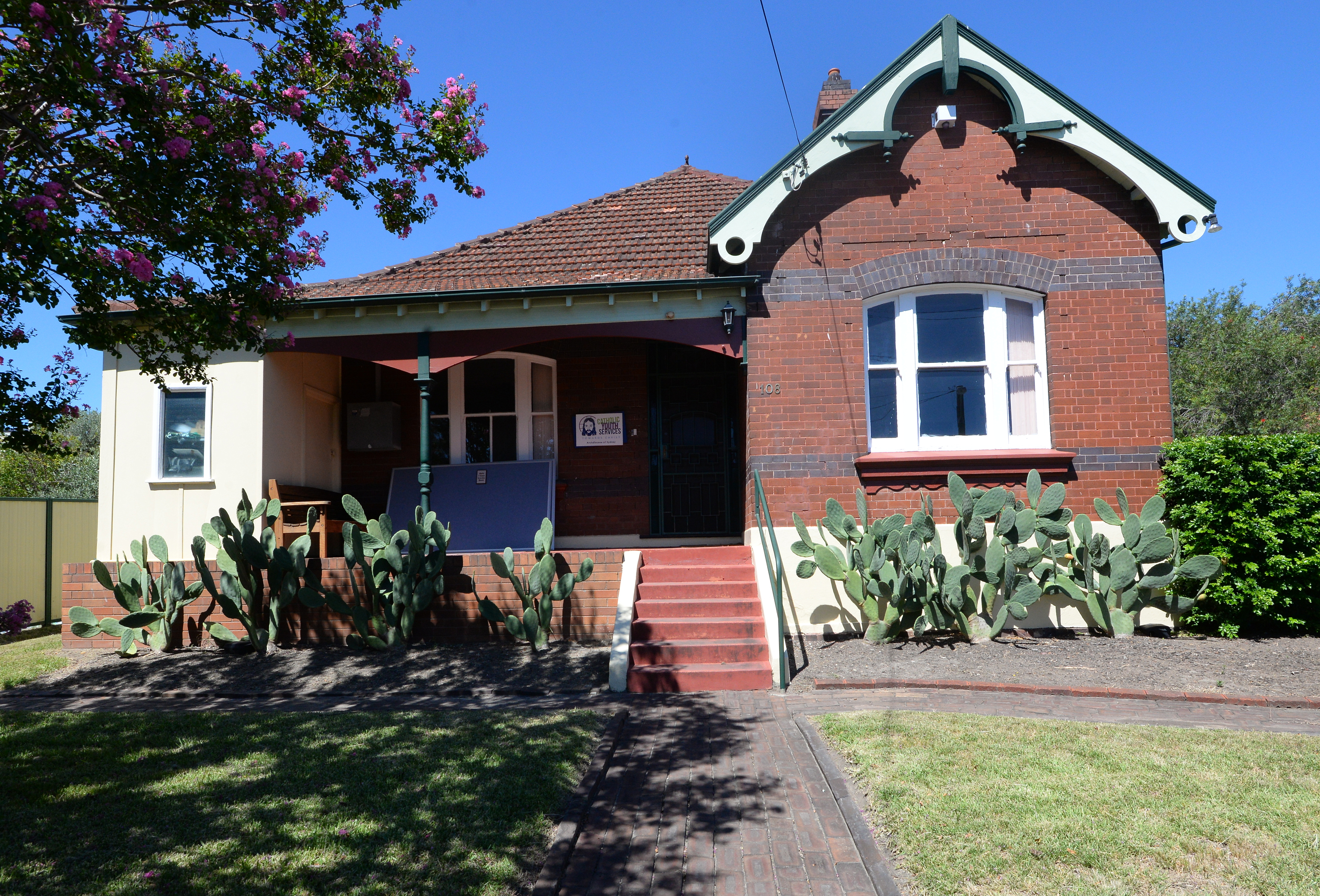
Federation-era cottage located in Flemington, currently used as a Catholic Youth Services facility.

The area was called Flemington by John Fleming, who was granted 200 acres (0.81 km^{2}) here in 1806.

A loosely defined area in the vicinity had earlier been called "Liberty Plains", because it was granted to the first free settlers "Liberty Plains" survives as the name of the Parish of Liberty Plains, a cadastral unit for land titles. Flemington is at the eastern extremity of the Parish of Liberty Plaints - neighbouring Homebush is in the Parish of Concord. The neighbouring suburb of Homebush is named after a nearby estate called "Home Bush", around today's Sydney Olympic Park, established in the 1800s by the colony's then assistant surgeon D'arcy Wentworth. According to local government historian Michael Jones, "Wentworth is popularly credited with having called the area after his 'home in the bush', although Homebush is also a place in Kent." Wentworth's estate did not include the village of "Homebush" south of the railway: the name came to the village indirectly, via Homebush railway station, built in 1855 and named after Wentworth's estate further to the north.

The part of the Fleming estate south of the railway was acquired by the Underwood Estate and subdivided in 1882, with streets laid out in a grid pattern that survives to this day. The streets in the grid are named after various locations in southern England, such as Richmond, Henley, Hampstead, Exeter, Tavistock and Eastbourne.

=== Flemington markets (Sydney Markets) ===
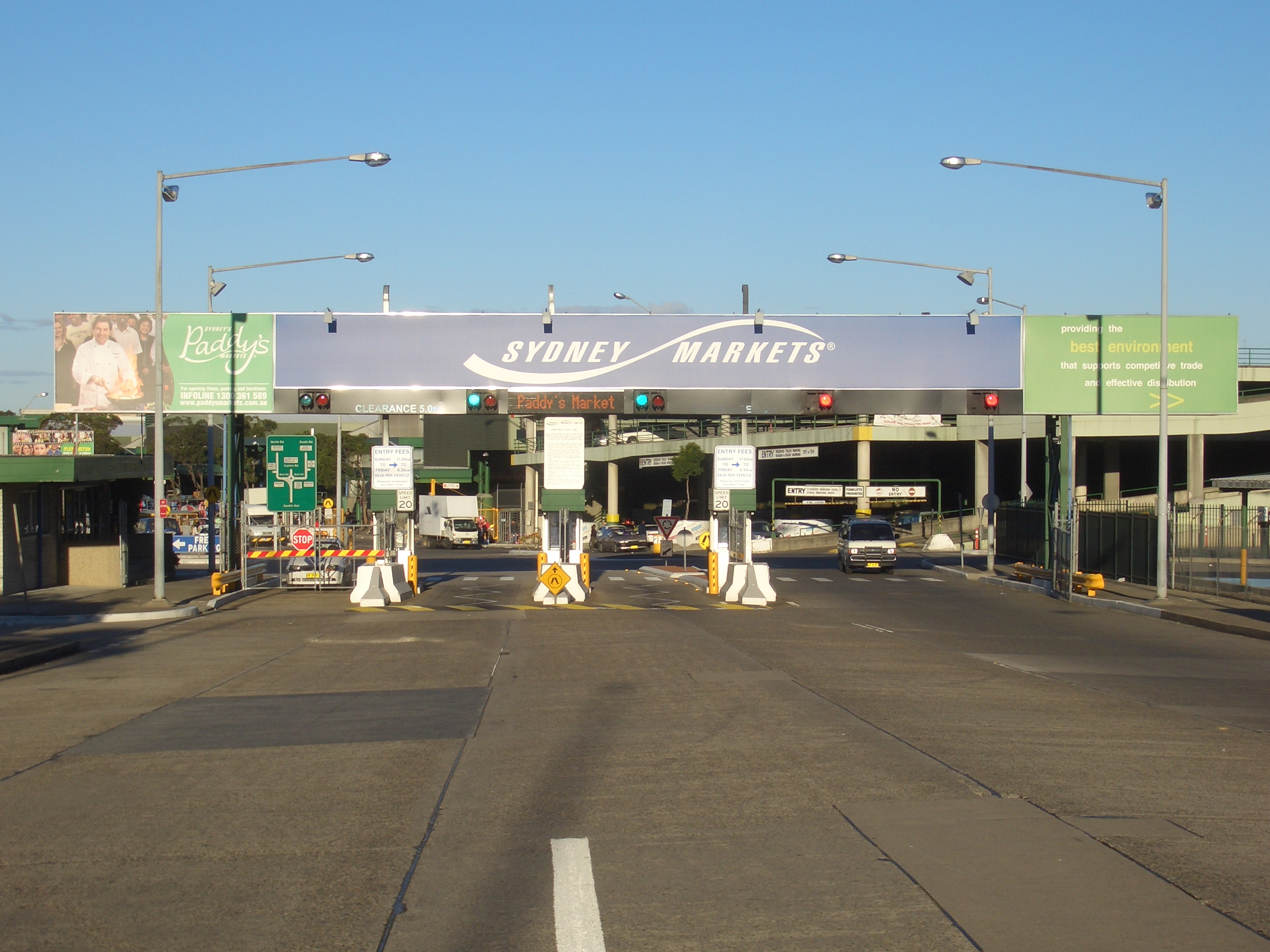
Entrance to the Sydney Markets

North of the railway, the bush was turned into paddocks and from 1883 was the site of a cattle saleyard, relocated from North Homebush, further east.

In 1892, Strathfield Municipality expanded west, taking in a large area incl

uding the part of Flemington south of the railway, after which homes in this part of the suburb became listed in directories under "Strathfield". The part of the suburb north of the railway was incorporated into the Municipality of Homebush (which also covered the part of modern-day Homebush north of the railway), which was eventually incorporated into Strathfield Municipality in 1947.

In the early 1970s, the Sydney Markets were built at Flemington on the site of the saleyards, to relieve the Paddy's Markets at Haymarket, in the city. The Sydney Markets at Flemington, built in 1975, became known as "Flemington Markets". Eventually, in 1992, the residential part of the suburb, south of the railway line, was officially renamed "Homebush West".

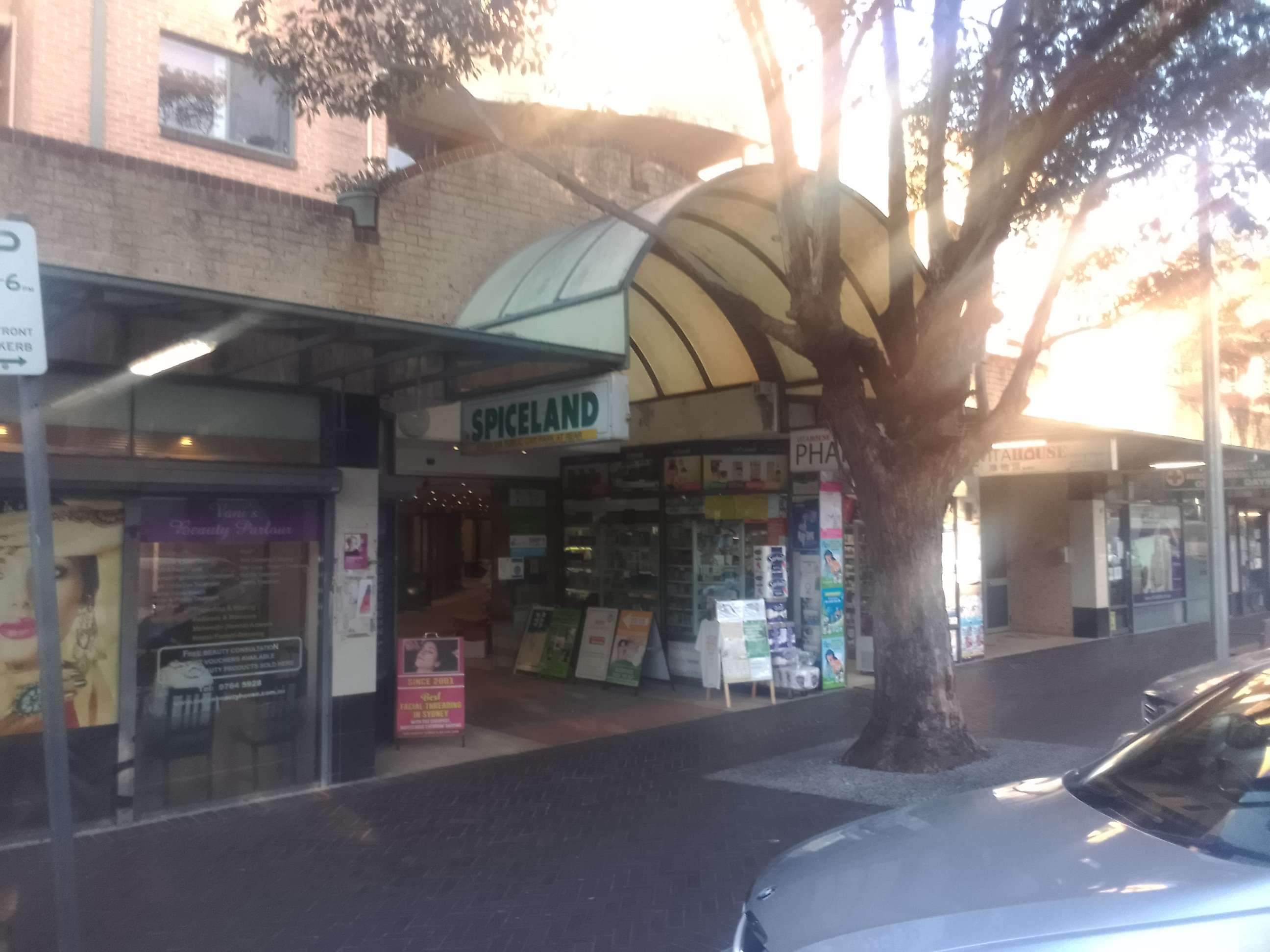
Spiceland and other arcade shops located on Henley Road

The Chinese community in Sydney has long had a strong presence in the market gardening sector in Sydney as well as the fruit and vegetable trade, which resulted in the development of a Chinatown at Haymarket. A number of these trading firms owned by members of the Chinese community developed into international conglomerates operating across the Asia-Pacific. When the markets, together with these trading firms, moved to Flemington, it brought a large ethnically Chinese presence to Flemington in the form of Chinese grocery stores, restaurants and Chinese-speaking doctors and pharmacists to service the market traders and their customers. The move of the markets coincided with the start of the wave of Vietnamese migration to Australia in the 1970s. Many of these immigrants also moved into the market garden trade. With a concentration of Chinese, Vietnamese-Chinese and Vietnamese businesses, the Flemington village centre acquired a cosmopolitan character with a southeast Asian flavour which it has retained to this day.

=== Ford factory site ===
West of Flemington markets, separated from the rest of the suburb by the A3 arterial road and the railway, the Ford car factory was built in 1935 and closed in 1994.

The residential area around the factory site were originally mostly built for Ford employees. The Ford factory site was part of the Borough of Rookwood, which became the Municipality of Lidcombe, which merged in turn into Auburn Council. In 1992, this area was transferred to Strathfield Council in exchange for an area to the north that was transferred to Auburn Council, in anticipation of the development of Sydney Olympic Park. A small, unpopulated strip of land in the northwest of the suburb immediately to the north of the Ford factory site, which lies between Parramatta Road and the M4 motorway, remained in Auburn Council and (after the abolition of Auburn Council) is now in Cumberland Council. Despite the change in the official name of the suburb to "Homebush West", this small unpopulated strip remains gazetted as an "urban place" under the name "Flemington".

== Transport ==
Flemington is serviced by Flemington railway station, on the Leppington & Inner West Line and Liverpool & Inner West Line of the Sydney Trains network. The station is very popular for locals but suffered from backlash after a renovation removed the historical concourse and station buildings.

Although Flemington station is a relatively small station, it is surrounded by a large concentration of railway infrastructure. To the west of the suburb is the Olympic Park railway line. Flemington Maintenance Depot is adjacent to the west, named after Flemington but in the suburb of Lidcombe. Goods line of the Sydney Freight Network intersect near the maintenance depot.

Flemington is bisected from north to south by the A3 road, a major arterial road.

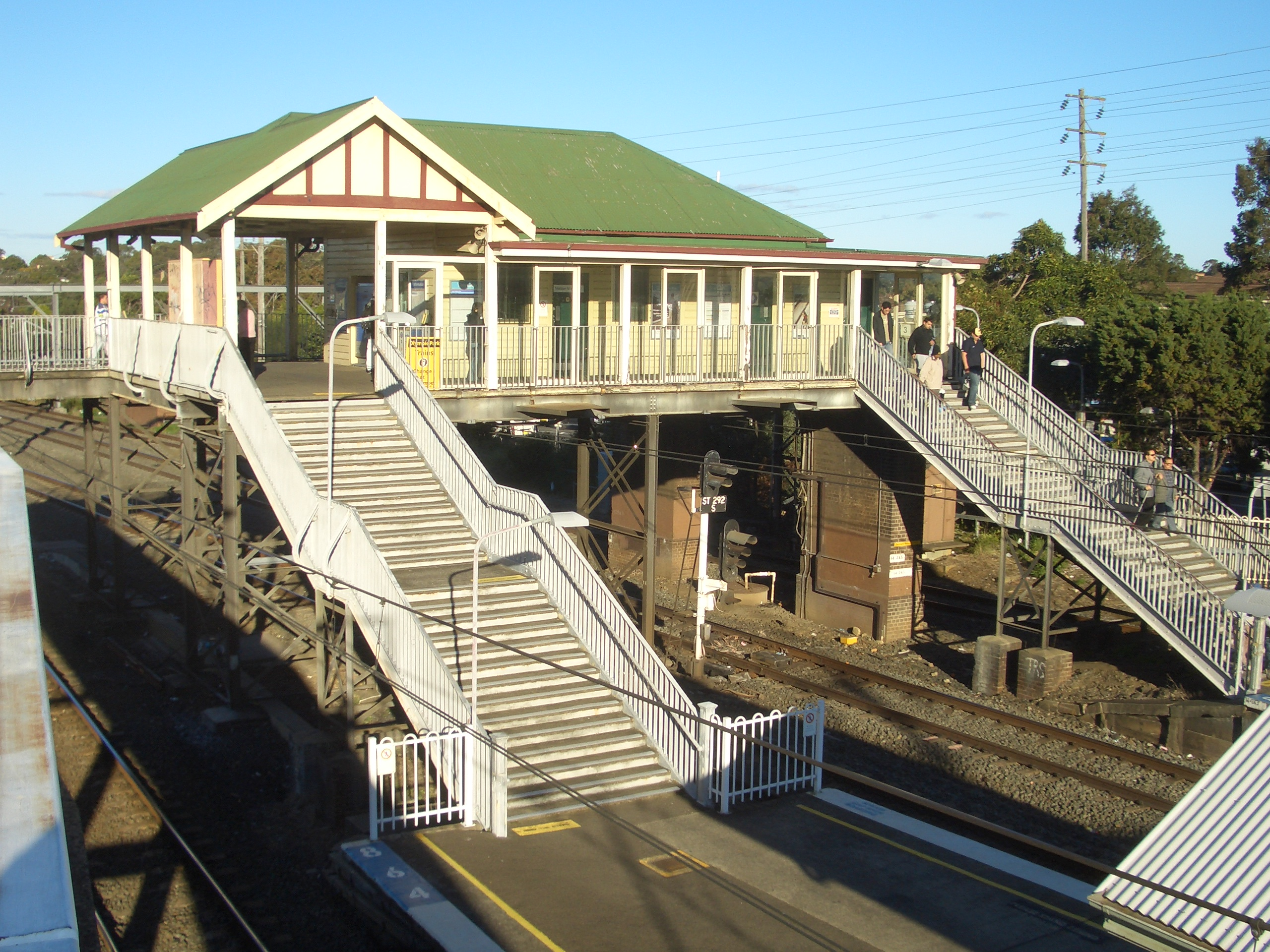
Flemington Railway Station prior to 2018 renovations

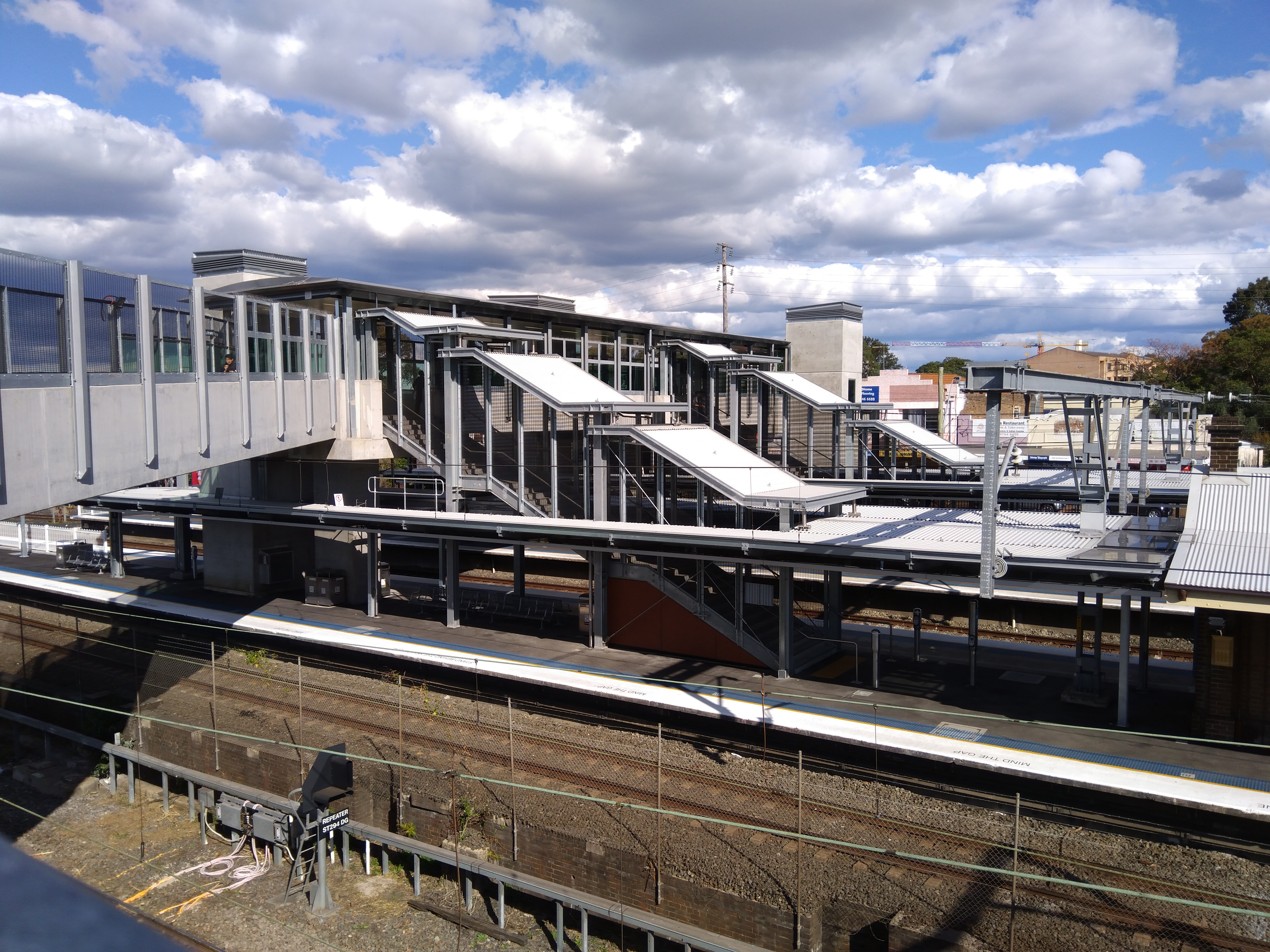
Flemington Railway Station after 2018 renovations

== Description ==
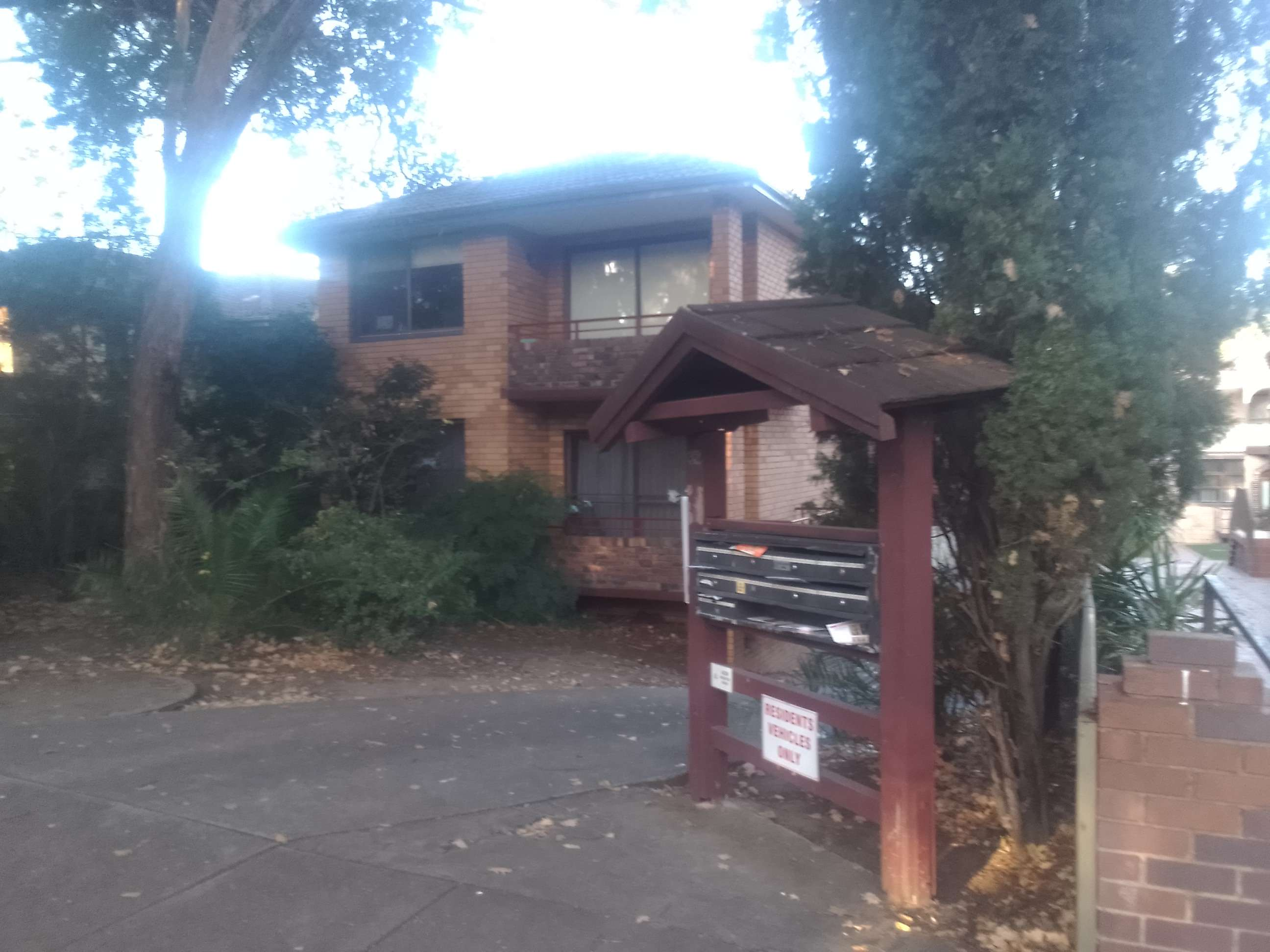
1970s style Apartment buildings located in Flemington

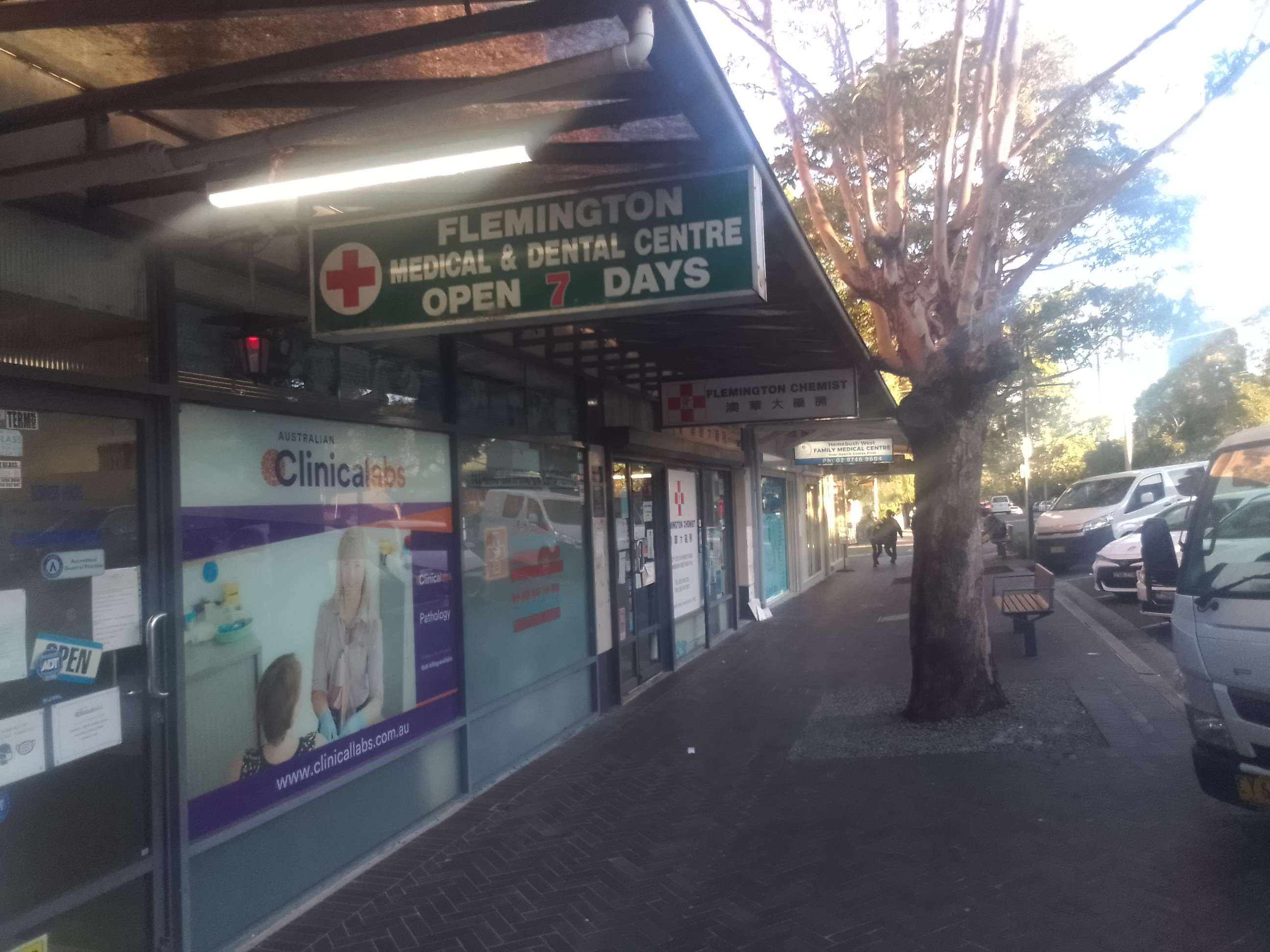
Flemington Medical and Dental Centre and Flemington Chemist on Henley Road

Flemington is divided into five areas by the railway, the A3 arterial road, Parramatta Road and the M4 motorway, each with a distinctive pattern of land use.

=== Flemington village (southeast) ===
In the original, residential part of the suburb located south of the railway, the Flemington village centre is composed of a cluster of shops located on The Crescent and nearby Henley Road, beside Flemington railway station. The village is home to a variety of Asian restaurants and business reflecting the ethnic makeups of the suburb's residents as well as the large workforce involved in the fresh food trade at Flemington markets. Chinese, Vietnamese, Sri Lankan, Indian, Malaysian and Nepalese restaurants, businesses and food stores are found across the suburb. The village is now largely made up of low-to-medium rise apartment buildings, except for a small number of detached houses close to the boundaries with Homebush and Strathfield.

=== Flemington markets (Sydney Markets) ===
The Flemington markets occupy the whole area north of the railway, south of Parramatta Road and east of the A3, and is serviced by a commercial complex called the Sydney Markets Plaza, which includes banks and a supermarket. Officially, the locality of "Flemington" refers only to the market complex and related facilities. This area has its own postcode, 2129, separate from the 2140 postcode used by the rest of the suburb.

=== Welfare Street area ===
Further north, a small part of the suburb lies between Parramatta Road and the M4 motorway. This area is largely industrial, with a small residential area between Welfare Street and Flemington Road, which was originally housing built for state abattoir employees. The houses were inherited by the Olympic Park Authority, which controversially sold them in 2014 to private owners. The houses on Welfare Street and Flemington Road form a heritage conservation area, but are cut off from all other residential areas and are increasingly surrounded by industrial construction.

=== Courallie Avenue area ===
The part of the suburb west of the A3 road and north of the railway, which was for many years the site of the Ford factory, is largely industrial, with a small residential area on Courallie Avenue which was originally housing built for Ford employees. A recent redevelopment of the industrial area has resulted in a large estate with almost 2000 residents sharing just six street numbers on Courallie Avenue.

=== Arthur Street industrial area ===
The part of the suburb west of the A3 road and south of the railway is now almost entirely industrial. The headquarters of the large Australian retailer, Harvey Norman, is located in this area.

=== Nearby ===
Although not technically part of the suburb, the DFO Homebush factory outlet shopping centre is located just to the north of the suburb.

== Schools ==
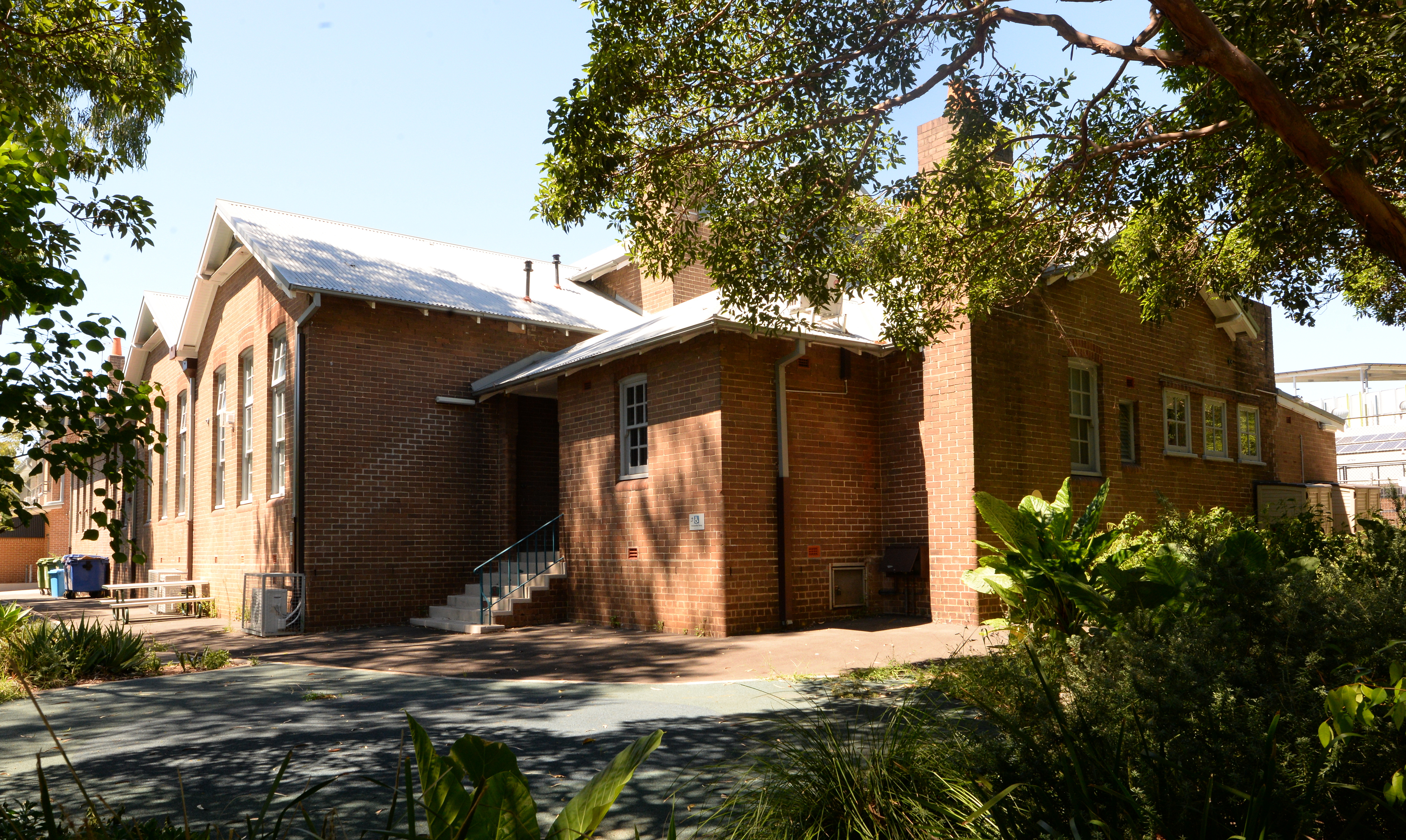
Homebush West Public School

The local primary school is Homebush West Public School, which was established in 1912 as Flemington Public School. St Dominics Primary School closed in 2006.

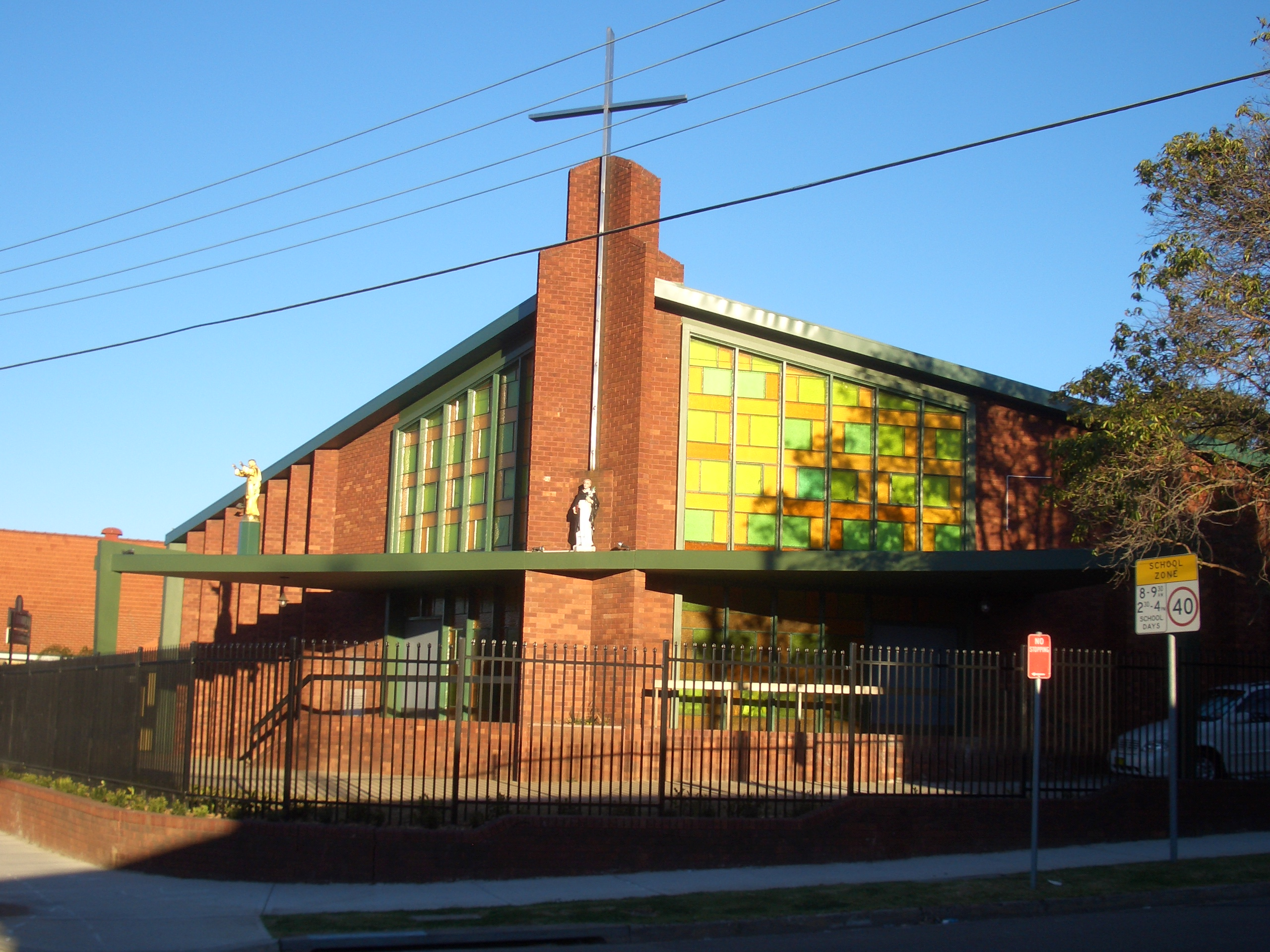
St Dominics Catholic Church

== Places of Worship ==
- St Dominic's Catholic Church
- St Columba Anglican Church (closed in 1999, used later as Inner West Baptist Church, then sold in 2017, heritage-listed by Strathfield Council)
- St Sava Serbian Orthodox Church
- Sri Karphaga Vinayakar Hindu Temple

== Population ==
At the 2021 census, there were 9,108 residents in Flemington. 24.4% of people were born in Australia. The next most common countries of birth were India 17.1%, China 12.5%, Nepal 12.2%, South Korea 3.4% and Philippines 2.7%. The most common reported ancestries were Chinese 24.2%, Indian 14.6%, Nepalese 12.9%, English 7.7% and Australian 4.8%. 18.4% of people spoke only English at home. Other languages spoken at home included Mandarin 12.9%, Nepali 12.5%, Cantonese 7.4%, Telugu 6.2% and Tamil 5.1%. The most common responses for religion were Hinduism 30.3%, No Religion 26.0%, Catholic 10.6%, Not stated 8.8% and Buddhism 7.3%.

== Residents ==
The following were either born or have lived at some time in the suburb of Flemington:

- Greg Haddrick (born 1960), screenwriter and television producer
- Ron Haddrick AM MBE (1929–2020), theatre, television, film and voice actor
- Bryan Palmer (1899–1990), Rugby Union player and coach of the Wallabies
- Judge George Weir (1903–1956) Industrial Relations Commission of New South Wales judge and politician
