= Market City, Haymarket =

Market City

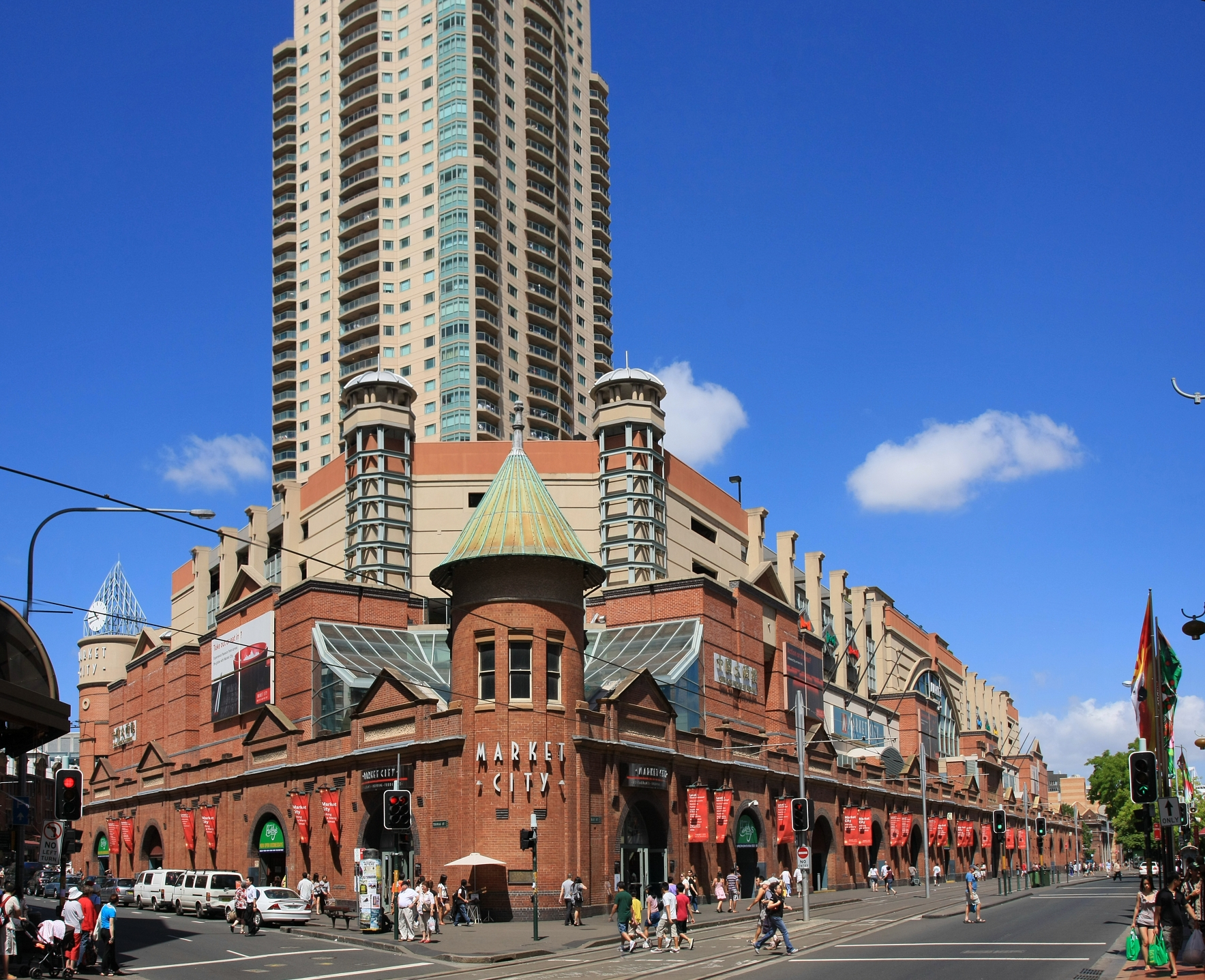
- Exterior of Market City with Peak Apartment tower on top
- Location: Haymarket, New South Wales, Australia
- Coordinates: 33°52′47″S 151°12′13″E
- Address: 9-13 Hay St, Haymarket NSW 2000
- Opened: 1997; 29 years ago
- Manager: Jen Properties
- Owner: Jen Properties
- Num. of stores: 66
- Num. of anchor tenants: 2
- Floor area: 15,000 m^{2} (161,459 sq ft)
- Floors: 4
- Parking: 627 spaces
- Website: www.marketcity.com.au

Market City is a shopping centre in Haymarket in the southern end of the Sydney Central Business District, Australia.

== Transport ==
Market City is a 5-minute walk from Central Station and a 10-minute walk from Town Hall Station.

The Inner West Light Rail offer frequent services to Paddy's Markets Light Rail Station opposite the centre.

Market City has a multi level car park with 627 spaces.

== History ==
Market City is located above Paddy's Markets inside the heritage listed red brick façade built in 1909 as a fruit and vegetable markets building. In 1997 the Market City shopping centre and factory outlets opened above Paddy's Markets.

On 18 November 1998, Reading Cinemas opened on level 3 along with Galaxy World amusement arcade. Reading Cinemas closed down on 26 August 2009, and in 2011, Galaxy World refurbished and converted the former cinema space into an extension.

In 2013 Galaxy World closed down and was taken over by City Amusements. City Amusements was taken over by PLAYTIME in 2017. This was then taken over by Timezone which opened in 2019.

In 2018 Market City refurbished its food court on level 1. On 16 April 2019 Market City opened its new dining precinct on level 3 on parts of the former cinema space. The dining precinct is known as 1909 Dining Precinct due to it being located inside the heritage listed 1909 building. 1909 Dining Precinct features rattan furnishing, antique-style finishes and a classic colour palette, complete with a custom-made rickshaw installation to fit in with the style.

== Tenants ==
Market City 15,000m² of floor space. The major retailers include Paddy's Markets, Thai Kee IGA, Market City Tavern and Timezone.
