= Paddy's Markets =

Retail market in Sydney, Australia

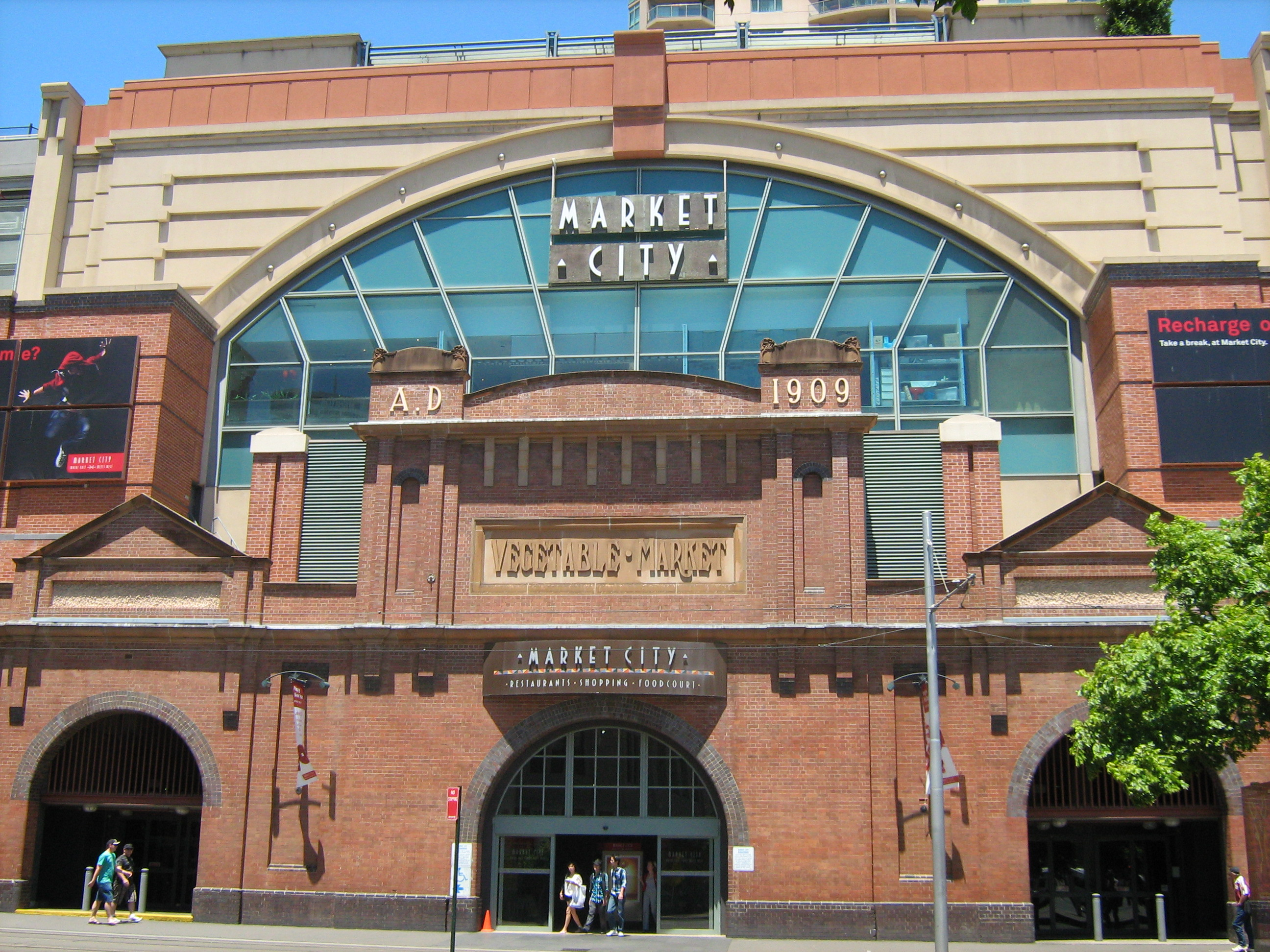
- Paddy's Markets, in Haymarket
- Location: Haymarket and Flemington, Sydney, New South Wales, Australia; 33°52′47″S 151°12′15″E
- Opening date: c.1930; 96 years ago
- Management: Sydney Markets Limited
- Website: paddysmarkets.com.au
- Interactive map of Paddy's Markets

Paddy's Markets is a commercial enterprise that has two large retail markets in Sydney, New South Wales, Australia. Paddy's Markets are located in Haymarket and Flemington and specialise in the sale of fruit, vegetables, fish, clothes and giftware. Both markets are operated by Sydney Markets Limited, along with the rest of Sydney Markets located at Flemington.

== Overview ==
The Paddy's Market site in Flemington is the larger site and specialises in fruit and vegetable sales. The market is the primary delivery service of these products for Sydney. The market has a wholesale sales section that caters to larger business and general sales to the public at the Paddy's Markets. Sydney Markets is the central marketplace for Sydney's farmers to sell their fresh produce, and includes Sydney Flower Market, the central provider of flowers to NSW and ACT florists. On weekends, Paddy's Markets feature clothes, gifts and souvenirs. There is also Paddy's Swap and Sell Market, where vendors set up a sales stand selling a range of secondhand goods.

The Paddy's Markets site in Haymarket is allocated in Haymarket, beside Chinatown and is more like a traditional flea market, specialising in cheap imported clothes, giftware and also has a small section for fresh fruit, vegetables and seafood. The Haymarket Paddy's Markets site also sells souvenirs which makes it popular with tourists.

== History ==
In 1834, NSW Governor General Richard Bourke moved the cattle, hay and grain markets to Campbell Street in the area now known as Haymarket. A "fringe" market was set up to serve the traders and some moved to the new markets in order to keep the business that they had built up over the years. Shortly after, the markets were allowed to stay open until 10:00pm on a Saturday night. Opposite the markets, a site that was a favourite with circuses resulted in a carnival atmosphere emerging, complete with sideshow attractions.

The origin of the name is unknown, but is believed to have come from Liverpool, England. St Patrick's Bizarre in Banastre Street was Liverpool's original Paddy's Market. When the Glasgow market closed in 2009, it was reported that its name of Paddy's Market had been in use for almost 200 years. In the 1870s, a similar operation had been set up which was known as Paddy's Markets. A fruit market opened in the early 1890s on the former circus site and stallholders were asked to apply for space or leave the area. Stall holders were moved again in 1938 to the No. 6 building, which was near the former site.

In the late 1960s, it was decided to move the markets away from Haymarket to a new site at Flemington, further west. As by this stage Paddy's Markets had become, as the Australian Labor Party opposition had put it, "a feature of Sydney life", It was decided to include a new Paddy's Markets in the new complex, which opened in 1975. Shortly after, with the construction of the Sydney Entertainment Centre, the No. 6 building in Haymarket was demolished with the markets moved into the No. 1 & No. 2 buildings.

Paddy's Market was redeveloped as Market City, completed in 1997. After temporarily moving to Redfern to make way for the development works, Paddy's Market resumed trading at Market City in 1993. The Sydney Markets Authority, privatised in 1997 as Sydney Markets Limited, continues to operate both the Flemington and Haymarket markets.

== Gallery ==
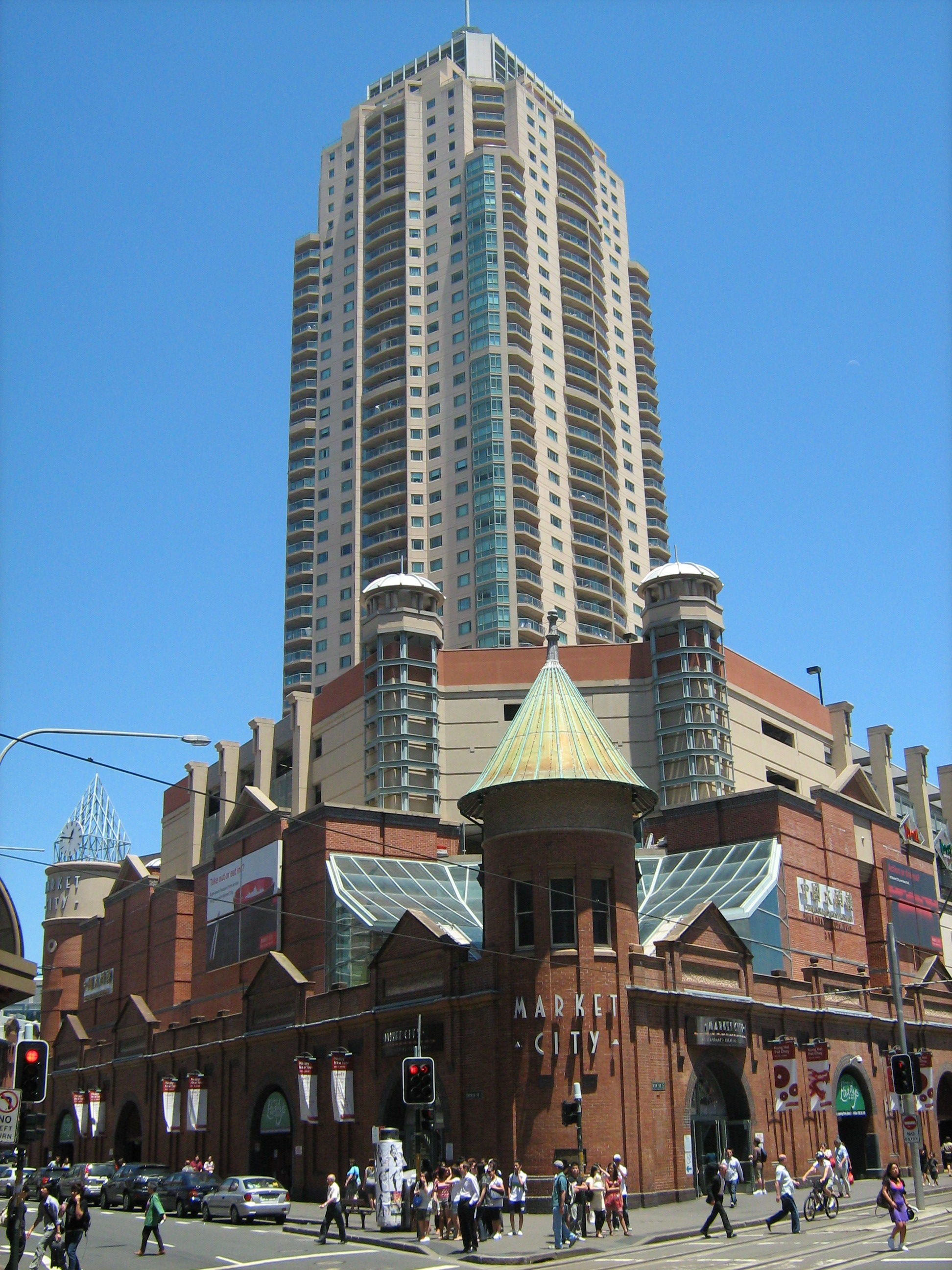
Market City above Paddy's Markets

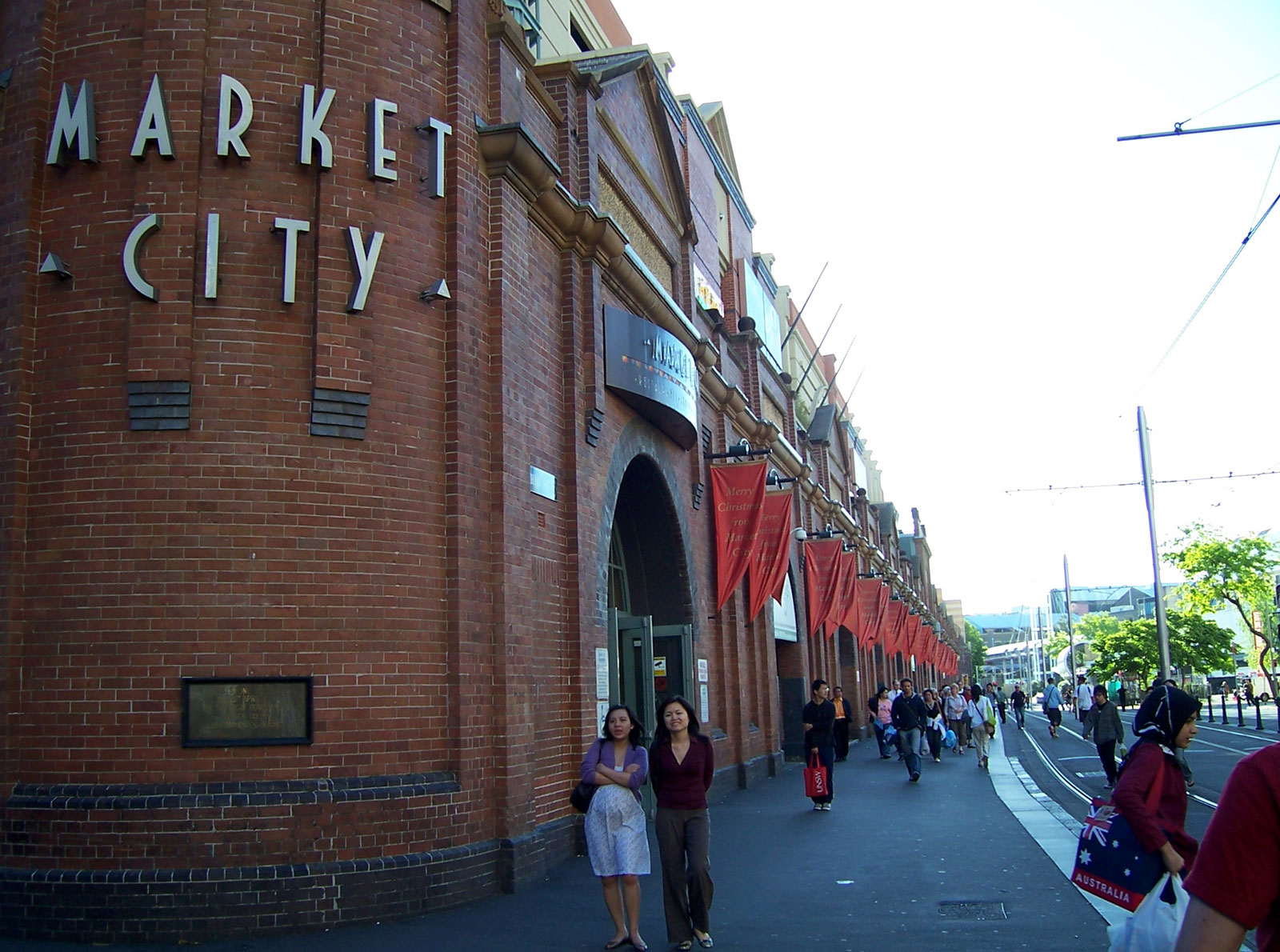
Paddy's Markets Haymarket

== See also ==
- List of markets in Sydney
- De Broodfabriek
- The Peak Apartments – the apartment complex above the markets
