= List of closed railway stations in Sydney =

The city of Sydney has been served by an extensive network of railway lines since the Main Suburban railway line opened in 1855, with over 70 railway stations in Sydney having been subsequently closed. Many of the stations closed as a result of the closure of the railway lines which they were located on.

== Closed lines ==
There are several closed lines in Sydney. Dates refer to each railway line's opening and closure dates and are not necessarily reflective of passenger service dates.

- The Abattoirs railway line (1911–1996), from Lidcombe to Abattoirs.
- The Camden railway line (1882–1963), from Campbelltown to Camden.
- The Holsworthy railway line (1918–1977), from Liverpool to Holsworthy.
- The Kurrajong railway line (1926–1952), from Richmond to Kurrajong.
- The Potts Hill railway line (1912–1966), from Regents Park to Potts Hill.
- The Prospect Quarry railway line (1902–1926), from Toongabbie to Prospect.
- The Rogans Hill railway line (1923–1932), from Westmead to Rogans Hill.
- The Rookwood Cemetery railway line (1864–1948), serving Rookwood Cemetery.
- The Ropes Creek railway line (1942–1986), from St Marys to Ropes Creek.
- The Warwick Farm Racecourse railway line (1889–1991), from Glenfield to Warwick Farm Racecourse.
- The Woronora Cemetery railway line (1900–1947), from Sutherland to Woronora Cemetery.

== Converted lines ==
There are several railway lines that have been either fully or partially converted for other purposes. The dates refer to each railway line's existence as part of the wider Sydney Trains and freight railway network.

Fully converted lines

- The Epping to Chatswood railway line (2009–2018), converted to form part of the Sydney Metro Northwest line.
- The Rozelle–Darling Harbour Goods railway line (1855–1996), converted to form part of the Inner West Light Rail.
- The Royal National Park railway line (1886–1991), converted to a heritage tramway for the Sydney Tramway Museum.

Partially converted lines

- The Bankstown railway line (1895–2024), converted to form part of the Sydney Metro City & Southwest line.
- The Carlingford railway line (1885–2020), converted to form part of the Parramatta Light Rail.
- The Sandown railway line (1888–2019), converted to form part of the Parramatta Light Rail.

== Stations ==
'Suburb' refers to the location of the station itself and may not correlate with the suburb served, such as Kirkham which was located in Elderslie but served the suburb of Kirkham.
Stations that were closed and later rebuilt or reopened have been noted through multiple dates.
'Replacement' refers to stations that were opened either directly after the former station's closure, or built later at the same location.
For ease of access, linkage to railway lines and suburbs are repeated throughout the table.

^{in} after a station name means "industrial station": stations built especially for workers. Many of these lines and stations also served non-worker passengers, such as the Sandown line.
* after a station name means "renamed sometime before closure", with some renamed several times. Stations are referred to by their final name before closure.
► after a replacement station means "later renamed as".
after a replacement name indicates a Sydney Trains station.
after a replacement name indicates a Sydney Metro station.
after a replacement name indicates a Sydney Light Rail station.
+/- after a replacement station's name indicates that it lies close to the disused station but is slightly displaced (and may not run along the same line).

The following railway stations in Sydney have been closed:

Name	Suburb	Line	Opened	Closed to passengers	Replacement	Current Status	Notes and References
Abattoirs	Sydney Olympic Park	Abattoirs	^{1926; 1938}	^{1938; 1984}	Olympic Park +/-	Demolished	
ANZAC Rifle Range	Wattle Grove	Holsworthy	1920	1974	None	Demolished	
Baulkham Hills	Baulkham Hills	Rogans Hill	1923	1932	None	Demolished	
Boshops^{in}	Greenacre	Elcar; Sigshops	1923	1993	None	Demolished	
Brickworks	Sydney Olympic Park	Abattoirs	1939	c.1980s	None	Demolished	
Bumberry Junction	Macquarie Fields	Main Southern	1891	1892	None	Demolished	
Camden	Camden	Camden	^{1882; 1883; 1901}	^{1883; 1901; 1963}	None	Demolished	
Camellia*	Camellia	Carlingford	1901	2020	^{Camellia ► Rosehill Gardens +/-}	Demolished	
Carlingford	Carlingford	Carlingford	1896	2020	Carlingford	Demolished	
Castle Hill	Castle Hill	Rogans Hill	1923	1932	Castle Hill +/-	Demolished	
Cemetery No. 1*	Rookwood	Rookwood Cemetery	1867	1948	None	Demolished	
Cemetery No. 2*	Rookwood	Rookwood Cemetery	1901	1948	None	Demolished	
Cemetery No. 3*	Rookwood	Rookwood Cemetery	1867	1948	None	Demolished	
Cemetery No. 4*	Rookwood	Rookwood Cemetery	1908	1948	None	Demolished	
Clyburn^{in}	Auburn	Main Southern	1948	c.1992	None	Demolished	
Cochrane	Ropes Crossing	Ropes Creek	1957	1986	None	Demolished	
Como	Como	Illawarra	1885	1972	Como +/-	Demolished	
Cream of Tartar Works^{in}	Camellia	Sandown	1927	1959	None	Demolished	
Cross Street	Baulkham Hills	Rogans Hill	1923	1932	None	Demolished	
Currans Hill*	Smeaton Grange	Camden	1882	1963	None	Demolished	
Delec^{in}	Strathfield South	Flemington–Campsie	1957	1996	None	Disused	
Duffys	Kurrajong	Kurrajong	1928	1952	None	Demolished	
Dundas*	Dundas	Carlingford	1896	2020	Dundas	Reused	
Dunheved	St Marys	Ropes Creek	1942	1986	None	Disused	
Elcar^{in}	Chullora	Elcar	1937	1994	None	Demolished	
Elderslie*	Elderslie	Camden	1893	1963	None	Demolished	
Enfield Loco^{in}	Strathfield South	Flemington–Campsie	1924	1996	None	Demolished	
Enfield South^{in}	Strathfield South	Flemington–Campsie	1924	1996	None	Demolished	
Glenlee	Menangle Park	Main Southern	1884	1947	None	Demolished	
Grahams Hill*	Narellan	Camden	1882	1963	None	Demolished	
Goodyear^{in}	Camellia	Sandown	1934	1990/1991	None	Demolished	
Hardies^{in}	Camellia	Sandown	1938	1991	None	Demolished	
Hope Street^{in}	Strathfield South	Flemington–Campsie	1927	1996	None	Disused	
Junction Road	Baulkham Hills	Rogans Hill	1923	1932	None	Demolished	
Kemsleys	North Richmond	Kurrajong	1928	1952	None	Demolished	
Kenny Hill*	Currans Hill	Camden	^{1882 c.1904}	^{c.1904 1963}	None	Demolished	
Kirkham*	Elderslie	Camden	1882	1963	None	Demolished	
Kurrajong	Kurrajong	Kurrajong	1926	1952	None	Demolished	
Log Cabin	Penrith	Main Western	1940	1950	None	Demolished	
Maryfields*	Campbelltown	Camden	^{1883; 1937}	^{1937; 1963}	None	Demolished	
Menangle Racecourse	Menangle Park	Main Southern	1914	1963	None	Disused	
Metropolitan Meat Platform	Sydney Olympic Park	Abattoirs	1915	1984	None	Demolished	
Milsons Point	Milsons Point	North Shore	^{1893; 1915}	^{1915; 1924}	Milsons Point	Demolished	
Milsons Point	Lavender Bay	North Shore	^{1915; 1924}	^{1915; 1932}	Milsons Point	Demolished	
Model Farms*	Winston Hills	Rogans Hill	1923	1932	None	Demolished	
Mons Road	Westmead	Rogans Hill	1923	1932	None	Demolished	
Moxhams Road	Northmead	Rogans Hill	1923	1932	None	Demolished	
Narellan	Narellan	Camden	^{1882; 1893; 1901}	^{1893; 1901; 1963}	None	Demolished	
North Menangle*	Menangle Park	Main Southern	1873	1937	Menangle Park +/-	Demolished	
North Richmond	North Richmond	Kurrajong	1926	1952	None	Demolished	
Northmead*	Northmead	Rogans Hill	1923	1932	None	Demolished	
Nurri	Kurrajong	Kurrajong	1928	1952	None	Demolished	
Parramatta Park*	Parramatta	Main Western	1861	1914	None	Demolished	
Parsonage Lane	Castle Hill	Rogans Hill	1923	1932	None	Demolished	
Phillip*	Richmond	Kurrajong	1928	1952	None	Demolished	
Pippita	Lidcombe \ Homebush West	Abattoirs	1940	1995	None	Demolished	
Potts Hill	Potts Hill	Potts Hill	1912	1966	None	Demolished	
Prospect	Pemulwuy	Prospect Quarry			None	Demolished	
Red Cutting	North Richmond	Kurrajong	1928	1952	None	Demolished	
Regent Street*	Chippendale	Rookwood Cemetery	1869	1938	None	Reused	
River Wharf	Long Island	Main North	1887	1920	None	Disused	
Rogans Hill	Rogans Hill (Castle Hill)	Rogans Hill	1924	1932	None	Demolished	
Rookwood*	Lidcombe	Main Southern	c.1887	1967	None	Demolished	
Ropes Creek	Ropes Crossing	Ropes Creek	1942	1986	None	Reused	
Rosehill	Rosehill	Carlingford; Sandown	^{1888; 1959}	^{1959; 2020}	None	Demolished	
Royal National Park*	Royal National Park	Royal National Park Branch	^{1886; 1978}	^{1978; 1991}	None	Reused	
Rydalmere*	Rydalmere	Carlingford	^{1896; 1993}	^{1993; 2020}	^{Rydalmere ► Yallamundi}	Demolished	
Sandown^{in}*	Camellia	Sandown	1892	1991	None	Demolished	
Scouts Camp	Loftus	Royal National Park Branch	1946	1991	None	Demolished	
Sigway^{in}	Chullora	Sigshops	1952	1990	None	Demolished	
Southleigh*	Castle Hill	Rogans Hill	1923	1932	None	Demolished	
Substation^{in}	Chullora	Elcar	1926	1994	None	Demolished	
Telopea	Telopea	Carlingford	1925	2020	Telopea	Demolished	
Thompsons Ridge	Kurrajong	Kurrajong	1928	1952	None	Demolished	
Warwick Farm Racecourse	Warwick Farm	Warwick Farm Racecourse Branch	^{1889; 1979}	^{1977; 1991}	None	Demolished	
Welders^{in}	Greenacre	Sigshops	1939	1993	None	Demolished	
Woronora Cemetery	Sutherland	Woronora Cemetery	1900	1947	None	Demolished	
