= Cemetery Station No. 2 railway station =

Railway stop in Sydney, Australia

Cemetery Station No. 2
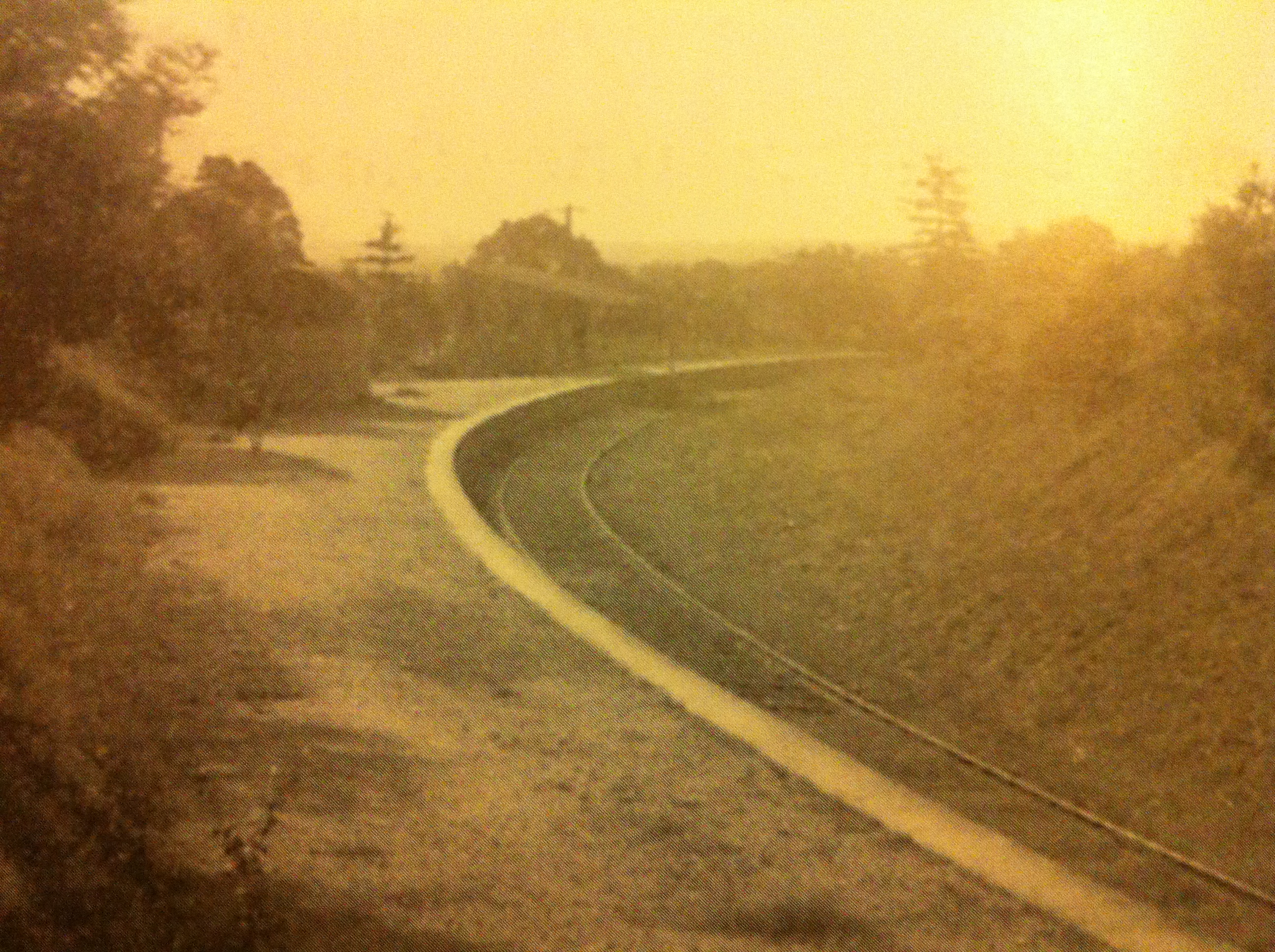
- The station at year of closure, in 1948

General information
- Location: Rookwood, Sydney, New South Wales; Australia
- Coordinates: 33°52′39″S 151°03′08″E
- Operator: Department of Railways
- Line: Rookwood Cemetery
- Distance: 18.397 kilometres (11.431 mi) from Central
- Platforms: 1
- Tracks: 1

Construction
- Structure type: Ground

Other information
- Status: Demolished

History
- Opened: 31 December 1901
- Closed: 29 December 1948
- Former names: Roman Catholic Platform (1901-1908)

Services
Preceding station	Former services	Following station
Cemetery Station No. 3 towards Cemetery Station No. 4	Rookwood Cemetery Line	Cemetery Station No. 1 towards Regent Street
Closed Sydney stations
Location

Cemetery Station No. 2 was a railway station on Sydney's Rookwood Cemetery railway line. It served the Rookwood Cemetery.

== History ==
The station opened as Roman Catholic Platform on 31 December 1901. The name was changed to Cemetery Station No. 2 on 15 June 1908. The station was closed on 29 December 1948. When compared to the neighbouring Cemetery Station No. 1, the station lacked grandeur, consisting of only a timber shed and curved platform.
