= Rookwood, New South Wales =

Rookwood
- Suburb
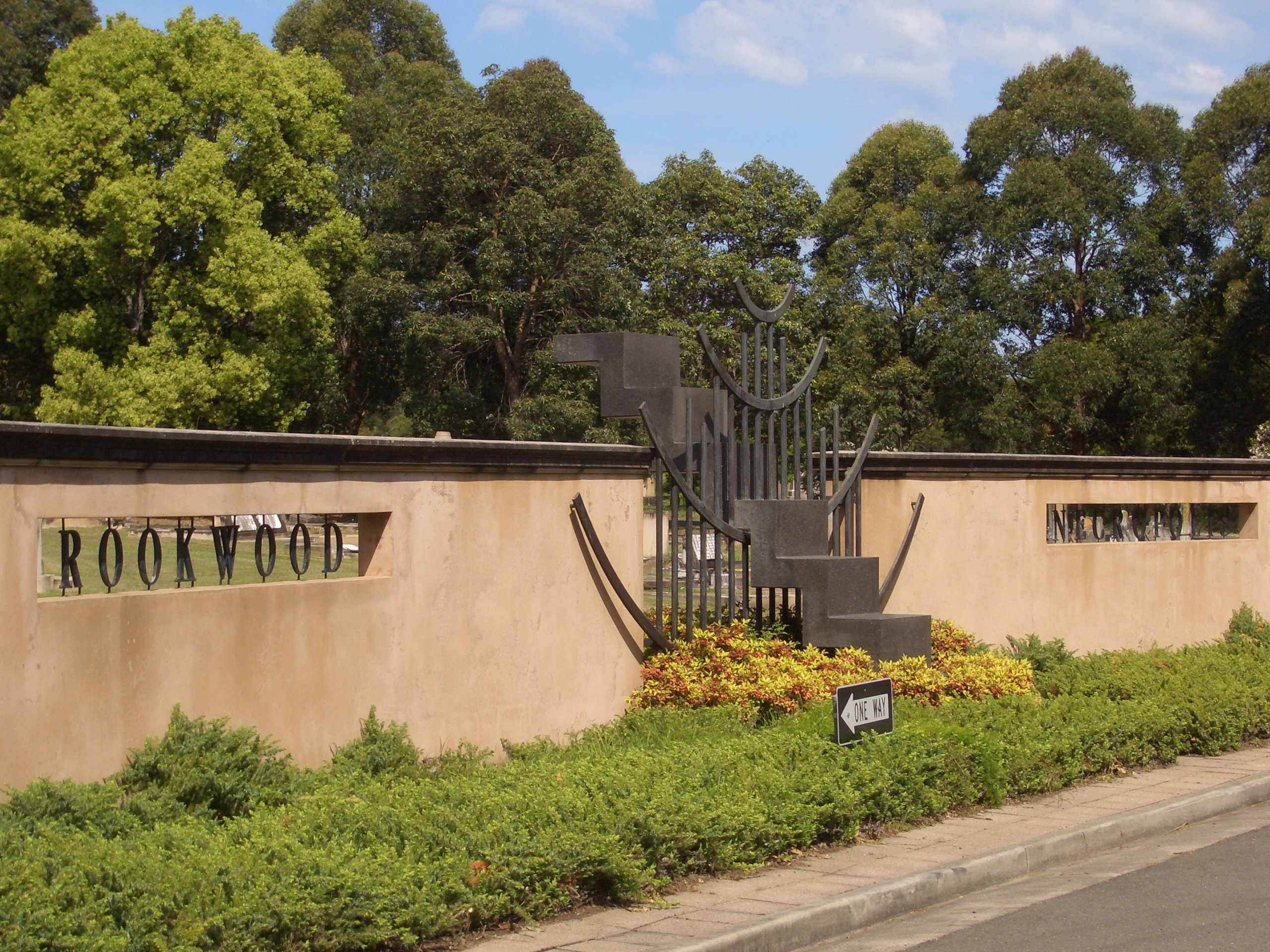
- Rookwood Necropolis

- Interactive map of Rookwood
- Coordinates: 33°52′22″S 151°03′20″E
- Country: Australia
- State: New South Wales
- LGA: Cumberland Council
- Location: 14 km (8.7 mi) west of Sydney CBD

Government
  - State electorate: Auburn
  - Federal division: Blaxland
- Elevation: 34 m (112 ft)

Population
  - Total: 0 (2021)
- Postcode: 2141
Suburbs around Rookwood
Lidcombe	Lidcombe	Flemington
Lidcombe	Rookwood	Strathfield
Chullora	Chullora	Strathfield South

The Mortuary Station in Rookwood Cemetery c. 1865

Rookwood is a suburb in western Sydney, in the state of New South Wales, Australia located 14 kilometres (8.7 mi) west of the Sydney central business district, in the local government area of the Cumberland Council.

It has had no permanent population for decades (as of 2021) and exists only to house Rookwood Cemetery.

== History ==
Rookwood was named from a title of an 1834 novel by William Harrison Ainsworth (1805–1882). A railway station called Haslam's Creek was opened in this area in 1859, on the railway line from Sydney to Parramatta. Samuel Haslam owned various grants beside the creek from 1804. Haslam's Creek was the site of the first railway disaster in New South Wales in July 1858, which resulted in two deaths.

When the necropolis opened in 1867, it was known as Haslam's Creek Cemetery. Residents disliked the association with the burial ground and in 1876 the suburb was renamed Rookwood. The name of the railway station was changed to Rookwood in 1878; and, by the 1880s, shops were established in the area.

== Transport ==
Rookwood railway station was on Sydney's Main Suburban railway line until its closure in 1967. The Rookwood Cemetery Line serviced Rookwood Cemetery and originally ran from Mortuary railway station, on Regent Street near Central railway station but has since closed.

The Cemetery railway line opened on 22 October 1864. At the time of its opening the line went as far as Cemetery Station No. 1. On 26 May 1897 an extension of the line to Cemetery Station No. 3 was opened. The extension required the removal of a waiting room on the rear wall of the Cemetery Station No. 1, so the line could pass right through the building. A final extension, to Cemetery Station No. 4 opened on 19 June 1908. The line closed in 1948.

Transit Systems operates one bus route through Rookwood:

- 408: Rookwood Cemetery to Burwood via Flemington, Homebush and Strathfield
