= Funeral train =

Funeral procession on a railway train

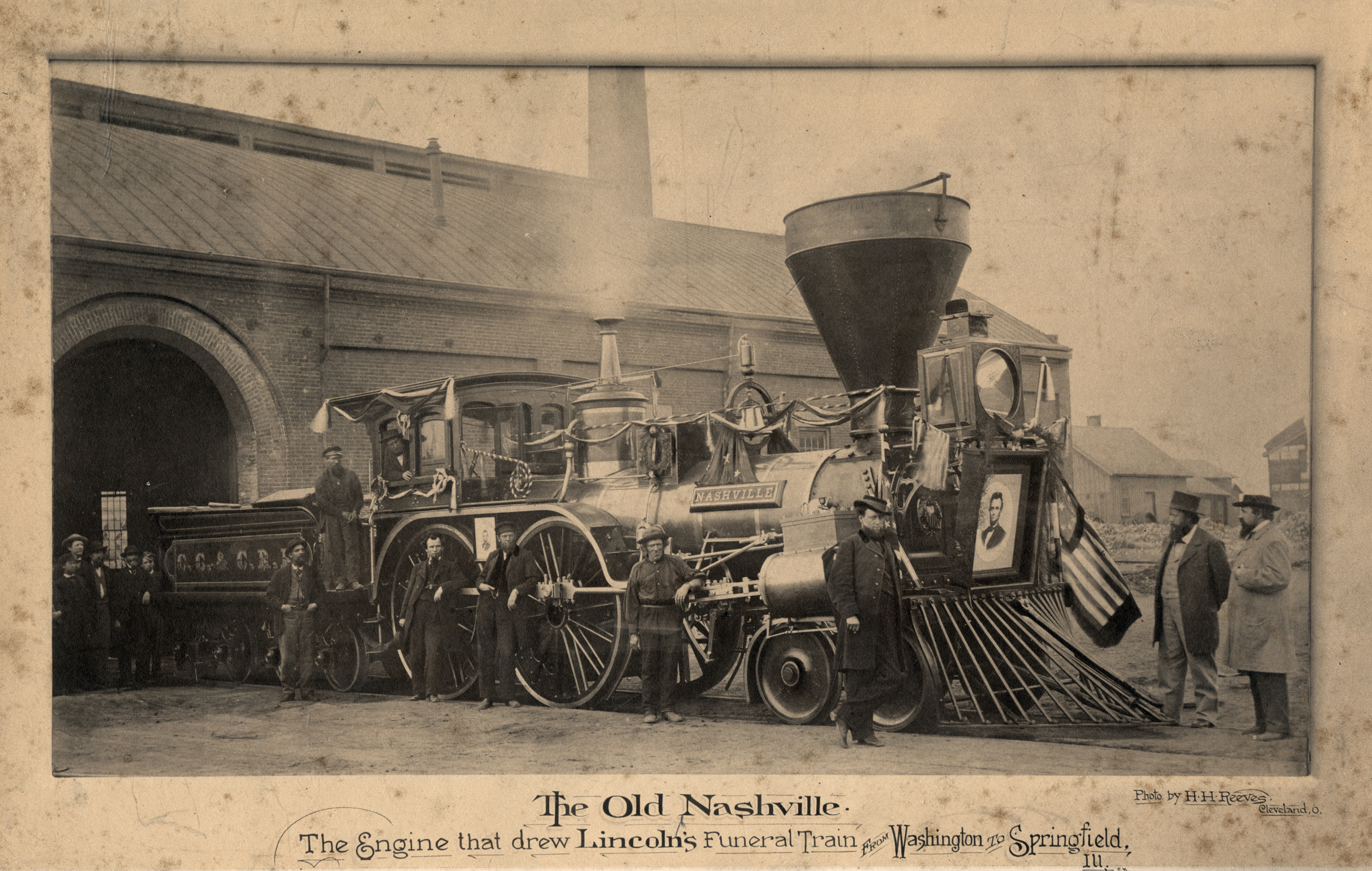
Abraham Lincoln's funeral train.

A funeral train carries a coffin or coffins (caskets) to a place of interment by railway. Funeral trains today are often reserved for leaders, national heroes, or government officials, as part of a state funeral, but in the past were sometimes the chief means of transporting coffins and mourners to graveyards. Many modern era funeral trains are hauled by operationally restored steam locomotives, due to the more romantic image of the steam train against more modern diesel or electric locomotives, although non-steam powered funeral trains have been used.

== History ==
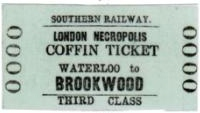
Third class coffin ticket, issued between April–September 1925.

The first funeral train was run by The London Necropolis and National Mausoleum Company on 7 November 1854. Trains ran once a day from London Necropolis railway station to Brookwood Cemetery. The train carried not only the bodies of the dead, but the parties of mourners who had come to attend the funeral services. Different classes were available for both the living and the dead; a more expensive first class ticket would provide a more ornate coffin and greater care of the body during transit. The London Necropolis Railway was run on the tracks of the London and South Western Railway, who feared that regular passengers would shun locomotives which had previously hauled funeral trains, and therefore purchased an entirely new fleet exclusively for the Necropolis line. The public were initially reserved about the project; one bishop expressed fears that "It may sometimes happen that persons of opposite characters might be carried in the same conveyance. For instance, the body of some profligate spendthrift might be placed in a conveyance with the body of some respectable member of the church, which would shock the feelings of his friends". Others felt that the railway industry, which was less than 20 years old and still very much a new technology, was too hectic and loud, ill-befitting the sombre mourning associated with Christian funeral services.

The line ran daily – including Sundays – for almost 50 years until 1900, when the Sunday service was stopped and trains began to run on an "as needed basis". The railway remained in operation through the First World War and Second World War until 16 April 1941, when the London Necropolis station was bombed in the London Blitz. The station was never rebuilt and the line fell into disuse.

When West Norwood railway station opened two years later it was sited near to the gates of South London Metropolitan Cemetery, founded twenty years earlier; pall-bearers would unload the coffin from its "Funeral special" and simply carry it from the side entrance to the main gates. While this practice is long discontinued, the side gates still remain.

Following the 1947 nationalisation of Britain's railways, the use of the railway to transport coffins went into steep decline. New operating procedures required that coffins be carried in a separate carriage from other cargo; as regular services to Brookwood station used electric multiple unit trains which did not have goods vans, coffins for Brookwood had to be shipped to Woking and then carried by road for the last part of the journey, or a special train had to be chartered. The last railway funeral to be carried by British Rail anywhere was that of Lord Mountbatten in September 1979, and from 28 March 1988 British Rail formally ceased to carry coffins altogether. Since Mountbatten, the only railway funeral to be held in the United Kingdom has been that of former National Union of Rail, Maritime and Transport Workers General Secretary Jimmy Knapp, carried from London to Kilmarnock for burial in August 2001.

=== Australia ===
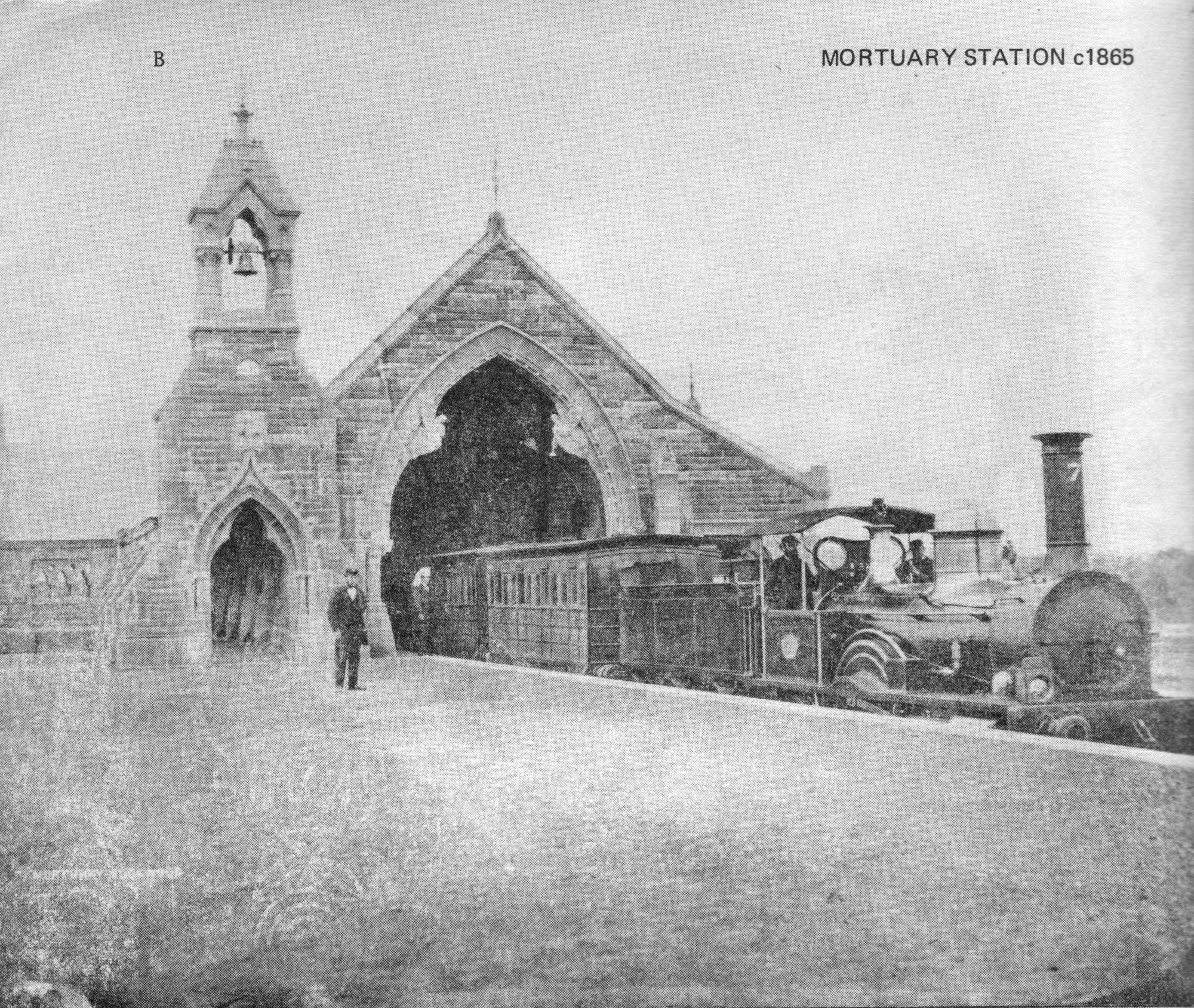
Cemetery Station No. 1 railway station, Rookwood Cemetery Australia

In Sydney, Australia, there was a similar service whereby the Rookwood Cemetery railway line served the Rookwood Cemetery complex. From 1867 until 1948 trains would depart Mortuary Station in Sydney City and travel the 15 km (9.3 mi) to Rookwood Cemetery.

In Melbourne funeral services operated to the Springvale Necropolis along the dedicated Spring Vale Cemetery railway, while the Fawkner Cemetery was served by trains to Fawkner station.

=== Finland ===
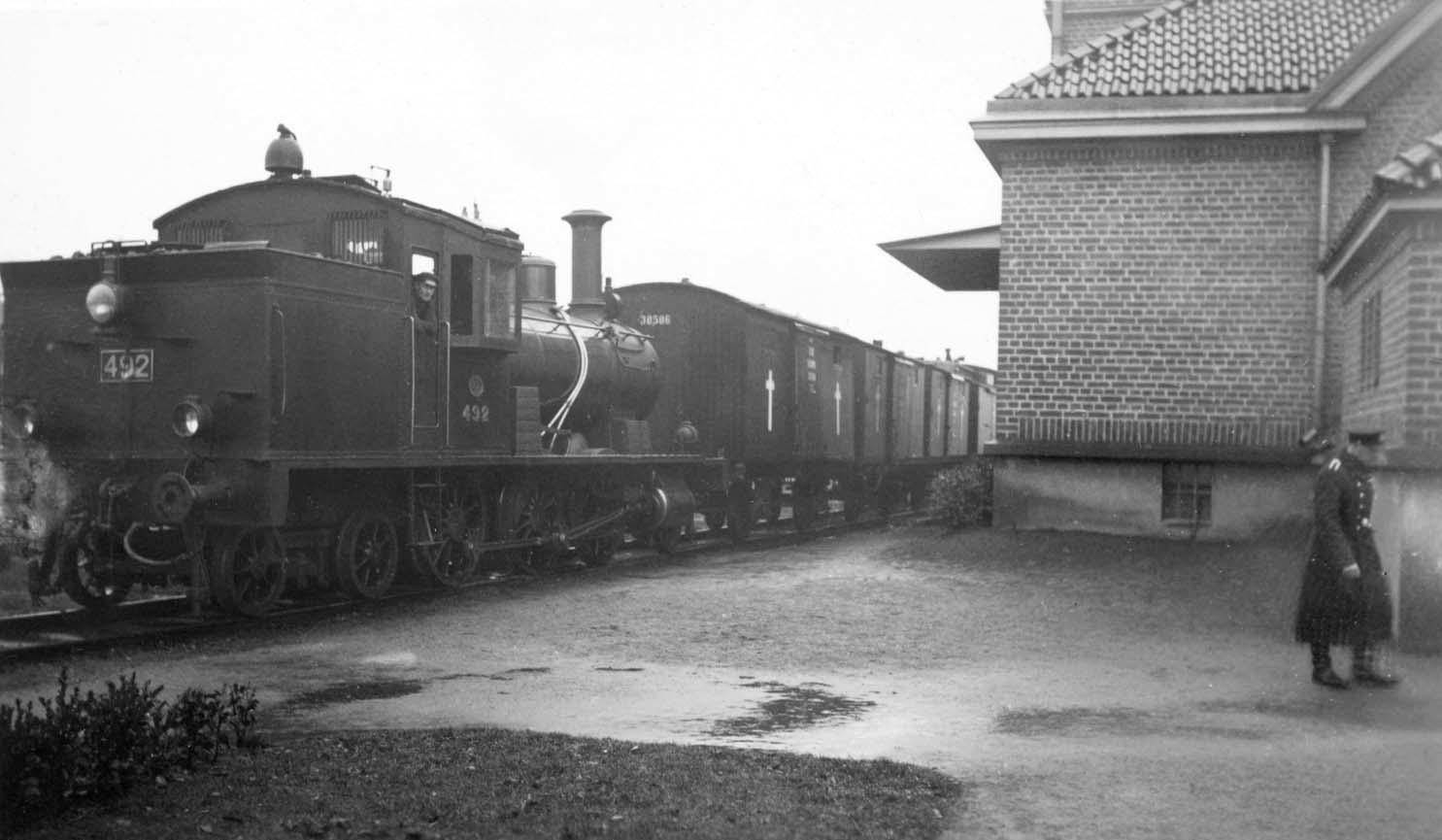
A funeral train at the Harju Morgue in Helsinki, Finland in 1931

In Helsinki, a two-kilometre (1.2 mi) long side track ran from the Malmi railroad station to the Malmi cemetery, which had its own railroad station. Coffins were transported to the cemetery from Harju morgue in Kallio. The track was decommissioned in 1954, and has been removed, but the Malmi cemetery station building still exists.

=== Germany ===
The Berlin Friedhofsbahn (Cemetery Line), opened in 1913, ran from Berlin-Wannsee station to Stahnsdorf South-Western Cemetery, about 20 kilometres (12 mi) southwest of Central Berlin. It was serviced by both funeral trains with passenger and hearse carriages, as well as regular S-Bahn (suburban rail) services. Funeral train service ended in 1952 and the construction of the Berlin Wall in 1961 spelled the end for cross-border S-Bahn services.

== State funerals ==
Although most funeral services now make use of road-going hearses rather than trains, funeral trains remain common for the funerals of heads of state.

=== Canada ===
Prime Minister Sir John Alexander Macdonald (Canadian Pacific Railway), John Diefenbaker and Pierre Elliott Trudeau (Via Rail) had their bodies transported by train.

=== Denmark ===
The last times a funeral train was used at a state funeral in Denmark were on 24 January 1972, when King Frederik IX of Denmark was taken from Christiansborg Palace Chapel via Copenhagen Central Station to Roskilde Cathedral, and on 14 November 2000, when his widow Queen Ingrid was taken along the same route. Queen Ingrid's funeral, including the train transfer with a steam engine, is documented in a lengthy report by Danish television and available online.

=== Philippines ===
Commonwealth President Manuel L. Quezon's coffin was transferred from Washington Union Station in Washington, D.C. to San Diego, California using a diesel-hauled train of the Atchison, Topeka and Santa Fe Railway starting on August 2, 1944.

=== Romania ===
King Michael I of Romania was given a state funeral on 16 December 2017. At the conclusion of the ceremonies in Bucharest, the coffin was taken from Băneasa railway station to Curtea de Argeș railway station on board the royal train for burial in Curtea de Argeş.

=== Russia ===
In 1894, the body of Tsar Alexander III, was transported by train from Livadia Palace in the Crimea, back to St. Petersburg, by way of Moscow. On 23 January 1924, the body of Vladimir Lenin was carried by funeral train to Moscow Paveletskaya railway station. Later Museum of Lenin Funeral train was established in the rail terminal building. This is now the Museum of the Moscow Railway.

=== Republic of Turkey ===
Mustafa Kemal Atatürk's coffin was transported to the capital Ankara by a funeral train from İzmit where it was brought to on the battlecruiser Yavuz, ex SMS Goeben.

=== United Kingdom ===
Every British monarch that died in the 20th century was conveyed by funeral train: Queen Victoria, King Edward VII and King George VI were both taken to the Windsor & Eton Central railway station for the funeral procession. Operation London Bridge planned for the body of Elizabeth II to be transported by the British Royal Train in the event of her death in Scotland, but instead the body was flown to RAF Northolt from Edinburgh Airport and transported by state hearse to Windsor, making her the first monarch in almost two centuries not to receive a funeral train.

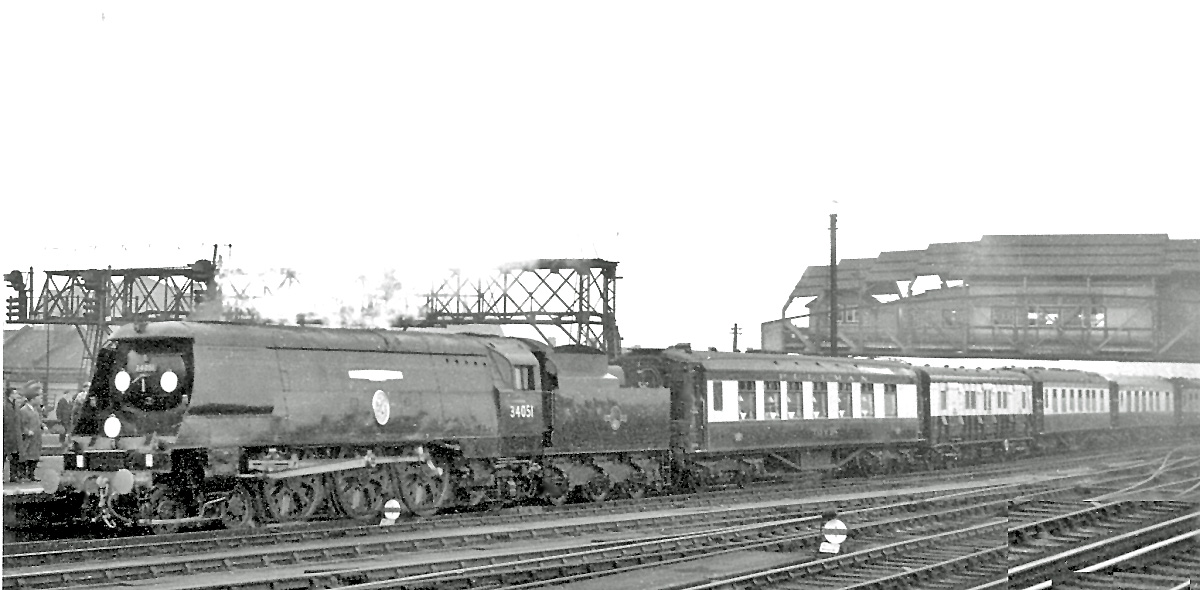
Sir Winston Churchill's funeral train passing Clapham Junction

Most British Prime Ministers do not receive funeral trains. However, as part of his state funeral, Winston Churchill's coffin was carried by a special train hauled by the Southern Railway "Battle of Britain" class locomotive Winston Churchill from Waterloo to Handborough, the closest station both to St Martin's Church, Bladon, where Churchill was buried, and to Blenheim Palace, with Class 52 Western diesel-hydraulic no. D1015 Western Champion taking the train back to Paddington.

=== United States ===
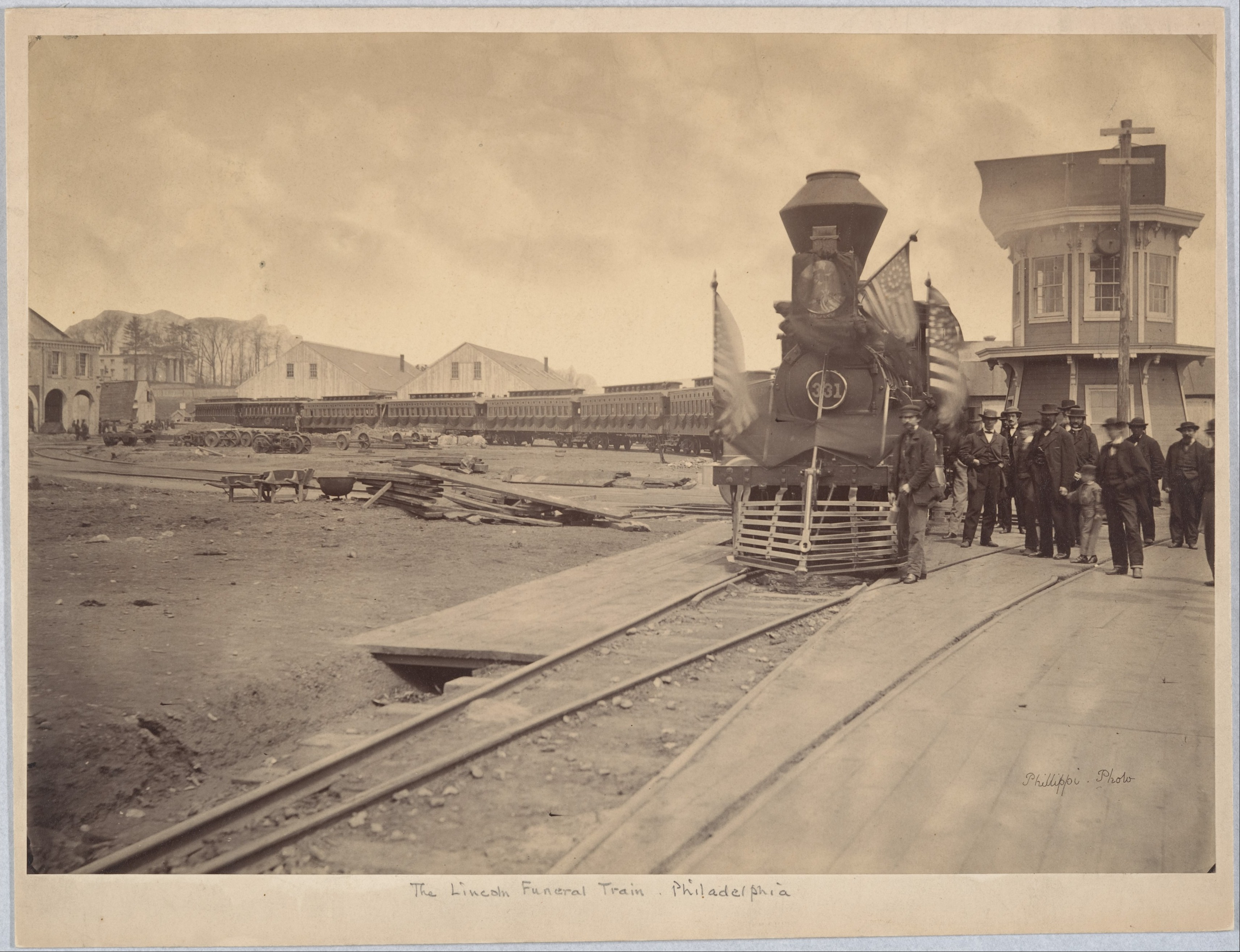
Abraham Lincoln's funeral train in Philadelphia, Pennsylvania, in 1865

Presidents transported in funeral trains were Abraham Lincoln (April 1865), James Garfield (1881), Ulysses S. Grant (1885), William McKinley (1901), Warren G. Harding (1923), Franklin D. Roosevelt (1945), Dwight D. Eisenhower (1969), and George H. W. Bush (2018).

Senator Robert F. Kennedy's body was brought by train from New York City to Washington DC following his assassination in 1968, a crowd estimated at one million lined the trackside. It was hauled by two Pennsylvania Railroad GG1 electrics. On June 5, 2013, Senator Frank Lautenberg of New Jersey, an advocate of public transit and Amtrak, was transported from Secaucus Junction to Washington.

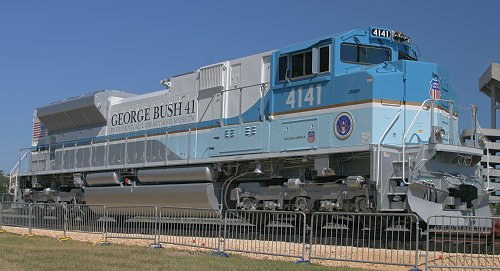
The locomotive of George H. W. Bush's funeral train

George H. W. Bush's funeral train (December 2018) carried his body from Westfield, Texas to the George Bush Presidential Library in College Station, Texas, where he was buried. Union Pacific selected 4141 and 9096 to transport Bush. 4141 is an EMD SD70ACe diesel locomotive that had been previously painted in a "George Bush 41" scheme in the style of Air Force One that had been dedicated to Bush when he and his wife Barbara toured the locomotive unit at its unveiling ceremony in 2005.
