= Clyburn =

Clyburn is a surname. Notable people with the surname include:

- Bill Clyburn (born 1941), American politician from South Carolina
- Danny Clyburn (1974–2012), American baseball player
- Jennifer Clyburn Reed, American businessperson and schoolteacher, a daughter of Jim Clyburn
- Jim Clyburn (born 1940), American politician and former Majority Whip in the U.S. House of Representatives
- Kris Clyburn (born 1996), American basketball player for Maccabi Rishon LeZion of the Israeli Basketball Premier League
- Mattie Clyburn (1922–2014), African-American member of the United Daughters of the Confederacy
- Mignon Clyburn (born 1962), American bureaucrat
- Weary Clyburn (1841–1930), American slave
- Will Clyburn (born 1990), professional basketball player, 2016 top scorer in the Israel Basketball Premier League, 2019 EuroLeague Final Four MVP

== See also ==
- Clyburn Lake, Canadian lake
- Clyburn railway station, Australian railroad station
