= Rookwood railway station, Sydney =

Former railway station in Sydney, Australia

Rookwood

General information
- Location: Railway Street, Lidcombe; Australia
- Coordinates: 33.8646°S 151.0525°E
- Operator: Department of Railways
- Line: Main Suburban Line
- Distance: 15.831 kilometres (9.837 mi) from Central
- Platforms: 2 (side)
- Tracks: 2

Construction
- Structure type: Ground

Other information
- Status: Closed

History
- Opened: 1887
- Closed: 1967
- Former names: Necropolis (c.1887-1914)

Services
Preceding station	Former services	Following station
Lidcombe towards Bourke	Main Western Line	Flemington towards Sydney
Location

Rookwood railway station was a railway station on Sydney's Main Suburban railway line, which served the Rookwood Cemetery, and the suburb of Rookwood. The station was located between the bridge over Arthur street and the westernmost junction of the Flemington rail yard. It consisted of two single faced platforms, one on the up suburban line and the other on the down suburban line.

== History ==
The station opened as Necropolis sometime before 1887. Its name was changed to Rookwood on 1 January 1914. It was closed in 1967.
