= Cemetery Station No. 3 railway station =

Railway stop in Sydney, Australia

Cemetery Station No. 3

General information
- Location: Rookwood, Sydney, New South Wales; Australia
- Coordinates: 33°52′41″S 151°3′2″E
- Operator: Department of Railways
- Line: Rookwood Cemetery
- Distance: 18.821 kilometres (11.695 mi) from Central

Construction
- Structure type: Ground

Other information
- Status: Demolished

History
- Opened: 26 May 1897
- Closed: 29 December 1948
- Former names: Mortuary (May 1897 - July 1897); Mortuary Terminus (1897 - 1908)

Services
Preceding station	Former services	Following station
Cemetery Station No. 4 Terminus	Rookwood Cemetery Line	Cemetery Station No. 2 towards Regent Street
Closed Sydney stations
Location

Cemetery Station No. 3 was a railway station on Sydney's Rookwood Cemetery railway line. It served the Rookwood Cemetery.

== History ==
The station opened as Mortuary station on 26 May 1897. The name was changed to Mortuary Terminus on 26 July 1897, then to Cemetery Station No. 3 on 15 June 1908. The station was closed on 29 December 1948. Its location is adjacent to the current Catholic Cemeteries Board HQ office and carpark and the 408 bus terminus.
