= Lidcombe Shopping Centre =

- Location: Lidcombe, New South Wales, Australia
- Coordinates: 33°50′58″S 151°02′56″E
- Address: 92 Parramatta Road
- Opened: 2005
- Manager: JLL
- Num. of stores: 71
- Num. of anchor tenants: 5
- Floor area: 29,652 m^{2} (319,170 sq ft)
- Floors: 2
- Parking: 1,085
- Website: www.lidcombeshoppingcentre.com.au

Lidcombe Shopping Centre is a shopping centre in Lidcombe, Sydney, Australia,

== History ==
Auburn Power Centre opened in 2006 on the site of the old Ford Fury car yard, office and warehouse building which was demolished in 2005. It was a bulky goods centre that featured Anaconda, Spotlight, Dick Smith Powerhouse, Discount Party Warehouse, a Ten Pin Bowling Alley and around 30 stores. Auburn Power Centre was renamed Lidcombe Power Centre in 2009. American retailer Costco opened its second Australian store across the road from Lidcombe Power Centre in late July 2011. Dick Smith closed its store in 2012.

Despite population growth in the area, Lidcombe Power Centre was facing a decline because it lacked a supermarket and discount department store. On 10 November 2014, Lidcombe Power Centre reopened after a $120m redevelopment that transformed the centre from a bulky goods centre to a sub-regional shopping centre. The centre was to be called The Marketplace Auburn. Leading retailers including Woolworths, Aldi and Kmart were added to the centre. Anaconda and Spotlight have continued trading during the redevelopment and moved to the new part of the centre when the redevelopment was completed. Discount Party Warehouse and Tenpin City have remain at their original locations.

This centre was developed by Newmark Capital and the APN Property Group. Up to 1,000 new jobs were forecast to be created as a result.

The centre is now known as the Lidcombe Centre and opened in August 2015.

In October 2018, Vicinity Centres sold Lidcombe Shopping Centre to a private investor for $145 million.

== Transport ==
U-Go Mobility bus route 920 from Parramatta to Bankstown passes the centre. The bus stop is located on John Street and is a five minute ride from Lidcombe station.
