= St Andrews Ukrainian School =

School in Sydney

Saint Andrews Ukrainian School
- Братська Рідна Школа ім. Святого Андрія

Location
- 57 Church Street, Lidcombe; Sydney, New South Wales; Australia; 33°51′48″S 151°02′50″E

Information
- Religious affiliation: Christianity
- Denomination: Eastern Orthodoxy
- Established: 1969
- Director: Maria Zarifeh (Марія Заріф)
- Years offered: Preschool — 10
- Nursery years taught: Preschool, Kindergarten
- Primary years taught: 1st through 6th grades
- Secondary years taught: 7th through 10th grades
- Enrollment: 135 (30 August 2024)
- Language: Ukrainian, English

St Andrews Ukrainian School is an Australian school founded in 1969. It was established by Ukrainian immigrants who came to Australia after World War II. It teaches from preschool to year 10.

The school was established as a way of teaching the next generation of Ukrainian children their language. It is located at 57 Church Street, Lidcombe, in the city of Sydney. In 2024, the director of the school was Odarka Breck. She received the Lifetime Community Service medal for her commitment to the school.
