= Clyburn railway station =

Former railway station in Sydney, Australia

Clyburn
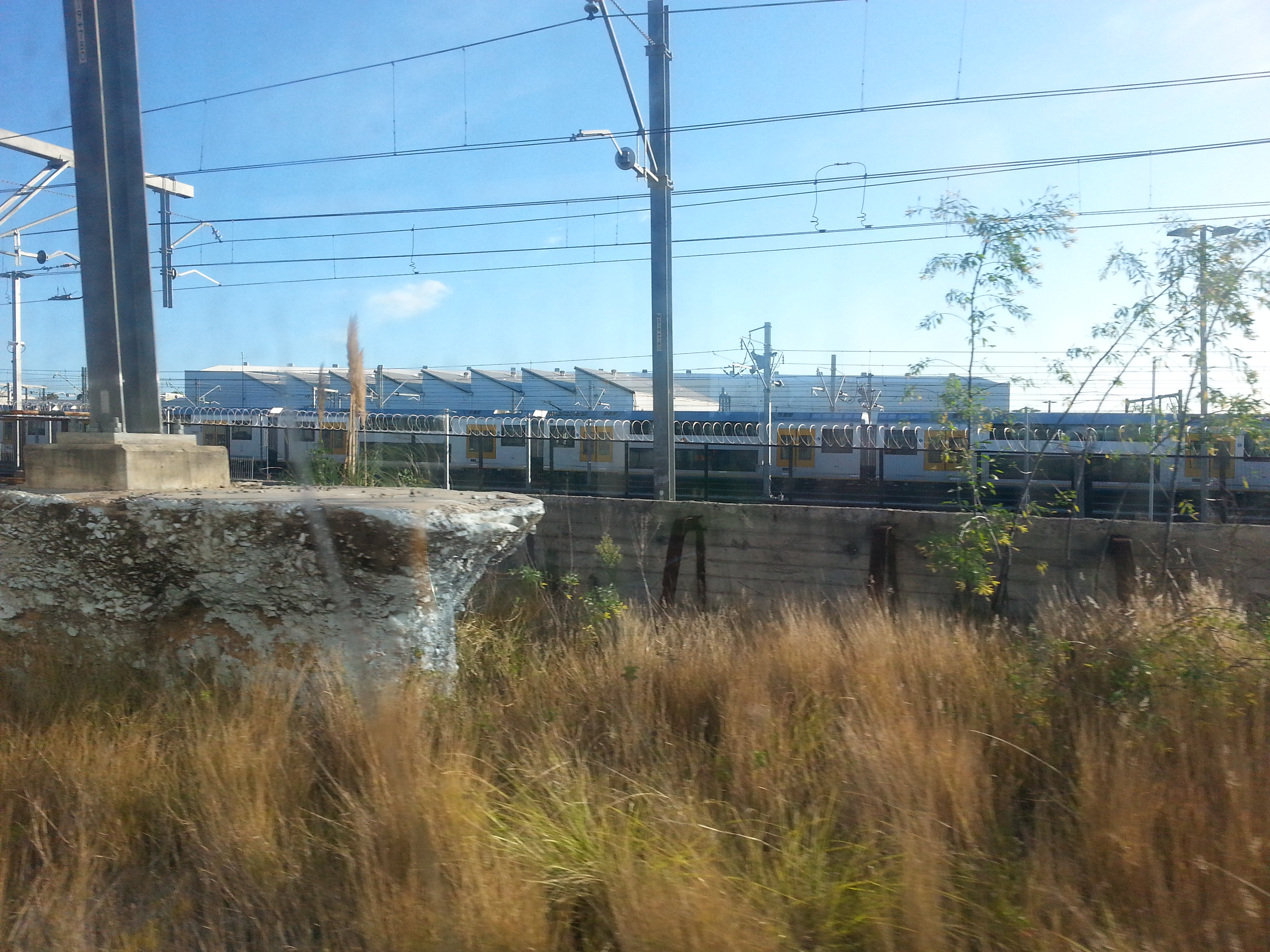
- Clyburn Railway Station rubble

General information
- Coordinates: 33°50′28″S 151°01′28″E
- Line: Main Suburban
- Platforms: 1 island platform
- Tracks: 2

Other information
- Status: Demolished

Services
| Preceding station | Former services | Following station |
|---|---|---|
| Clyde towards Parramatta | Main Western Line | Auburn towards Sydney |
Location

Clyburn railway station is a demolished railway station in Sydney, Australia. It was a railway employee only island platform located between the Up and Down Suburban Lines, between Clyde and Auburn stations on the Main Suburban railway line. It served Clyde Yard on the up side of the line and the former New South Wales Government Railways workshops on the down side.

This station only had trains stopping at the beginning and ending of workshops work times but a lantern was in the stations awning for railway employees to "flag" down trains if they were working at other than normal workshop hours. Also there was a footbridge installed for railway employees to gain access to both Clyde Yard and the railway workshops, however this footbridge was dismantled due largely to safety issues in 2006.

There was no public access available. As part of the demolition of this station, the awnings, trees and top of the station were taken out on the week of 20–27 December 2009. Currently, only the station foundations and also station ground which connect stanchions to the earth are there at the station site.

In February 2016, a State Transit bus guide accidentally included the demolished station in a region map, forcing the operator to recall and reissue the map.

== See also ==
- Railways in Sydney
- Closed Sydney railway stations
