= Scouts Camp railway station =

Former railway station in New South Wales, Australia

Scouts Camp

General information
- Location: Vicinity of Loftus Oval, Loftus; Sydney, New South Wales; Australia
- Coordinates: 34°03′05″S 151°03′08″E
- Operator: Department of Railways
- Line: Royal National Park
- Distance: 26.980 km (16.765 mi) from Central
- Platforms: 1 (1 side)
- Tracks: 1

Construction
- Structure type: Ground

Other information
- Status: Demolished

History
- Opened: December 1946 (79 years ago)
- Closed: January 1947 (79 years ago) (actual); 9 September 1991 (34 years ago) (official)
- Electrified: Yes (from opening)
Location

Scouts Camp railway station was a short-lived unadvertised railway station located on the South Coast line, serving the New South Wales Boy Scouts Jamboree in the Sydney suburb of Loftus. While the station was only used for the event between 1946 and 1947, it wasn't officially closed until 1991.

== History ==
Scouts Camp station was opened in December 1946, to serve the New South Wales Boy Scouts Jamboree event from December 1946 to January 1947. It was also known as The Scouts Platform, and received no regular passenger service outside of event services. Scouts Camp was not used past January 1947 at the conclusion of the jamboree, however it was only officially closed on 9 September 1991 when CityRail passenger services on the Royal National Park line ceased. The platform was subsequently demolished before conversion of the line for the Sydney Tramway Museum.

=== Oval tram platform ===
In 2010, a 17 metre (56 ft) platform was built by the Sydney Tramway Museum at the site of the former Scouts Camp station, and referred to as the Oval platform. It was a temporary platform used for the Sutherland Shire's annual "Breakfast Torque" motorcycle awareness week, and was located next to Loftus Oval. The platform was constructed from concrete and four fabricated panels, and back filled with ash from the remains of Scouts Camp. A temporary tram stop sign was also completed and used for the event.

The Sydney Tramway Museum ran a morning public shuttle service from Pitt Street near Loftus railway station, at a 15-minute frequency throughout the duration of the event. The platform remains in situ but is not used by the museum.
