= Cemetery Station No. 1 railway station =

Former railway station in Sydney, Australia

Cemetery Station No. 1
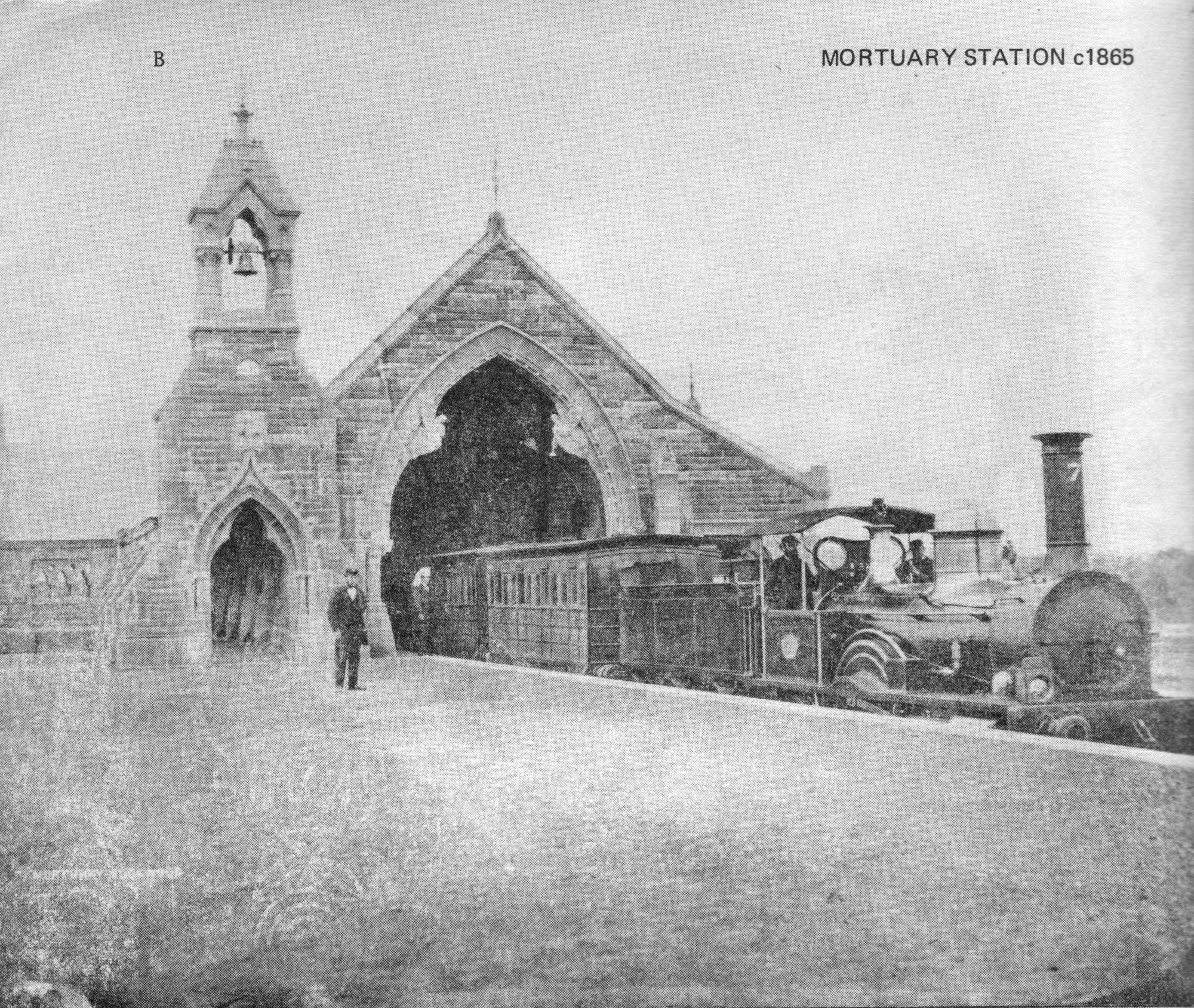
- Haslem's Creek Cemetery station c. 1865

General information
- Other names: No. 1 Mortuary Receiving Railway Station
- Location: Rookwood Cemetery, Sydney, New South Wales; Australia
- Coordinates: 33°52′11″S 151°03′04″E
- Operator: New South Wales Government Railways
- Line: Rookwood
- Distance: 17.54 kilometres (10.90 mi) from Central
- Platforms: 1
- Tracks: 1

Construction
- Structure type: At grade

Other information
- Status: Closed and relocated; Remnant historical site

History
- Opened: 1 April 1867
- Closed: 29 December 1948
- Former names: Haslem's Creek Cemetery (1867- c.1872); Necropolis (c.1872-unknown); Mortuary Terminus (unknown-1897); Mortuary General Cemetery (1897-1908)

Services
| Preceding station | Former services | Following station |
|---|---|---|
| Cemetery Station No. 2 towards Cemetery Station No. 4 | Rookwood Cemetery Line | Regent Street Terminus |
Location

The Cemetery Station No. 1 was a railway station situated on the Rookwood Cemetery railway line in Sydney, New South Wales, Australia. Operating from 1867 to 1948, it primarily served the Rookwood Cemetery. The station's architectural design was overseen by New South Wales Government Architect, James Barnet.

== History ==
The Cemetery No. 1 railway station (also known as No. 1 Mortuary Receiving Railway Station) was situated on the Rookwood Cemetery railway line. It was decided that funeral processions could be conducted with more dignity and ease if more formal stations were constructed to replace the original ones, which had corrugated iron and timber structures. A scheme was initiated in 1868 to segregate funeral operations from regular railway activities by establishing new platforms. This effort commenced with the construction of the Cemetery station inside the Necropolis.

The station opened as Haslem's Creek Cemetery on 1 April 1867. Some time before 1872, the station name was changed to Necropolis. The station was called Mortuary Terminus before having its name changed to Mortuary General Cemetery on 26 July 1897, when its name was transferred to the new terminus (later Cemetery Station No. 3 railway station). Finally, the name was changed to Cemetery Station No. 1 on 15 June 1908, and it closed on 29 December 1948.

The sandstone station building included wide platforms, a ticket office, two vestibules, retiring rooms and a carriage port. This building was elaborately decorated in a similar style to Regent Street railway station in Redfern. The work of sculptors Thomas Ducket and Henry Apperly and carvers Moxon and Apperly SMH (Thursday 9 April 1868 p5), included angels, cherubs, gargoyles and various foliage carvings featuring flowers, pears, sycamores, apples and pomegranates. Black and white floor tiles created by Cumberland pottery were laid in a tessellated pattern on the floors.

The building spanned the terminus of the railway line into the cemetery so it created a tunnel effect. It covered an area of 35 by 13 metres (115 ft × 43 ft) and was approximately 6 metres (20 ft) high, being carried on 12 columns. An arch at each end of the building was approximately 12 metres (39 ft) high and 13 metres (43 ft) wide at the base. The northern arch was decorated with two angels opposite each other on the inner side of the arches. One angel appeared to be holding a scroll and its eyes were closed. The other angel was set to look down the railway line and held a trumpet in its hands. The building had a bell-cote for housing a bell that was used during the funeral services. The bell was tolled to warn passengers of the impending departure time. It is believed (but not verified) that the bell would ring as each train arrived, and between 1910 and 1920 the bell was rung 30 minutes before the train was to depart to warn the passengers. It rang again when there was five minutes left to departure.

The station was an ornate stone building. After closure the station building was dismantled and moved to Canberra in 1958, where it is now All Saints Church. The rebuilt church contains some modifications, the most obvious of which is the change in position of the bell tower to the opposite side.

=== Restoration ===
In the middle of 2000, work began to improve the station site at Rookwood Cemetery and to restore the original pathways. The restoration work included exposing the gutters, uncovering the foundations of the platform (located at 33°52'10.86"S 151° 3'4.48"E), indicating the former locations of the structural columns and re-gravelling the pathways. A signpost at the site indicates the name for the station as being No. 1 Mortuary Receiving Station and states that building work commenced on 14 April 1867, and was completed 10 August 1869.
