= Lidcombe =

- Suburb
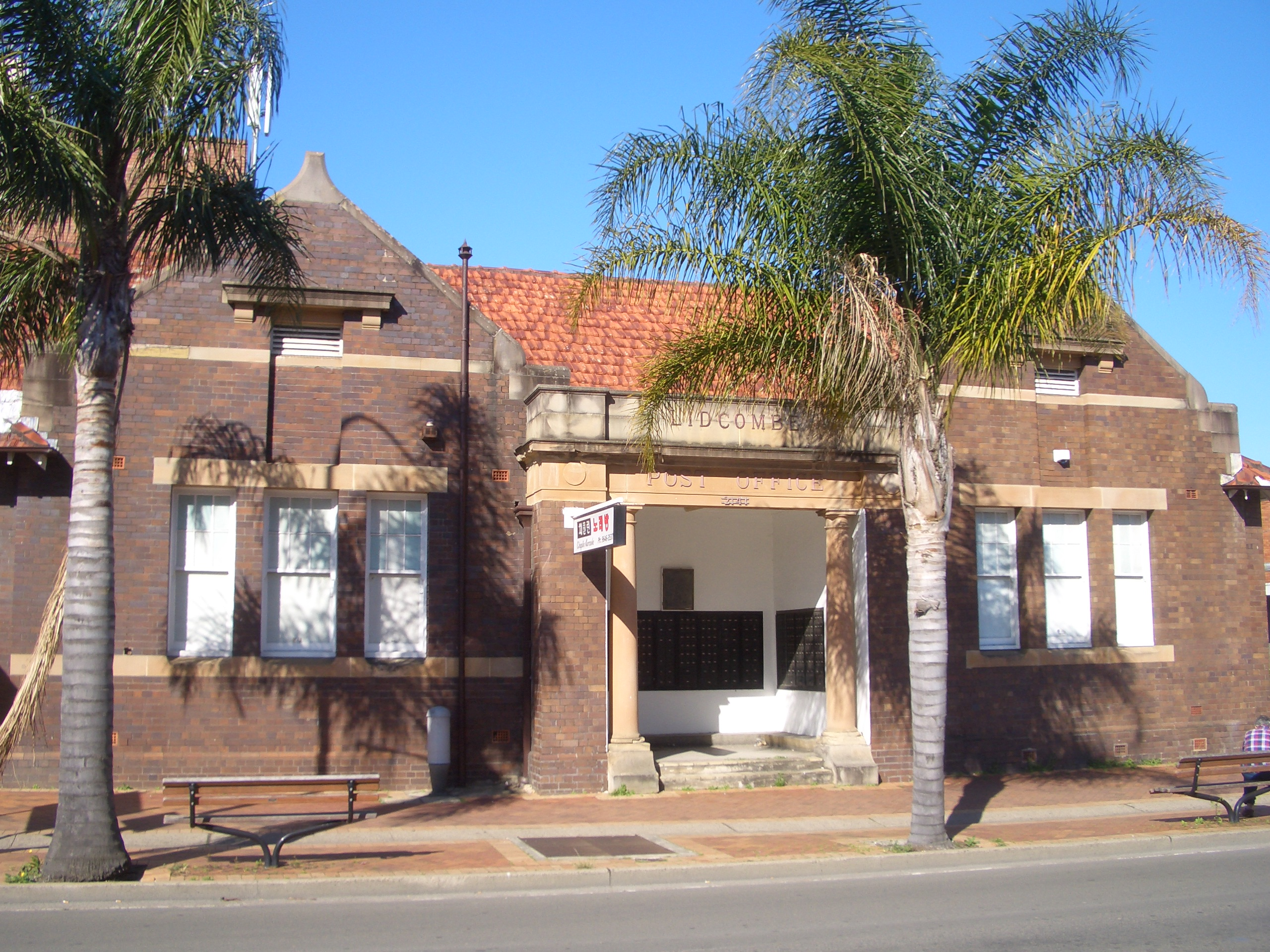
- Former Lidcombe Post Office, Joseph Street

- Interactive map of Lidcombe
- Coordinates: 33°51′53″S 151°02′44″E
- Country: Australia
- State: New South Wales
- City: Sydney
- LGAs: Cumberland Council; City of Parramatta
- Location: 15 km (9.3 mi) west of Sydney CBD Map

Government
  - State electorate: Auburn
  - Federal divisions: Blaxland; Reid

Area
  - Total: 6.8 km^{2} (2.6 sq mi)
- Elevation: 19 m (62 ft)

Population
  - Total: 21,197 (2021 census)
  - Density: 3,117/km^{2} (8,070/sq mi)
- Postcode: 2141
Suburbs around Lidcombe
Silverwater	Newington/Sydney Olympic Park	Flemington
Auburn	Lidcombe	Rookwood
Berala	Potts Hill	Strathfield

Lidcombe (/lɪdkəm/) is a suburb in Sydney, in the state of New South Wales, Australia. Lidcombe is located 15 km (9.32 mi) west of the Sydney central business district, in the local government area of Cumberland Council, with a small industrial part in the north in the City of Parramatta.

== Demographics ==
In the 2021 Census, there were 21,197 people in Lidcombe. 30.6% of people were born in Australia. The next most common countries of birth were South Korea 14.4%, China 11.1%, Nepal 7.0%, Vietnam 5.7%, and The Philippines 2.8%. The most common reported ancestries were Chinese 27.6%, Korean 17.7%, Nepalese 7.0%, English 6.4% and Australian 5.8%.19.5% of people only spoke English at home. Other languages spoken at home included Korean 16.8%, Mandarin 12.1%, Cantonese 9.3%, Nepali 6.8% and Arabic 3.8%. The most common responses for religion were No Religion 27.4%, Catholic 17.2%, Hinduism 10.5% and Buddhism 9.7%.

Lidcombe was, up until recent years a traditional working-class suburb. Over the past decade, Lidcombe has experienced the processes of gentrification. Today, the suburb is cosmopolitan, reflecting the waves of immigration to post war Australia. Lidcombe is home to a large Korean community. Many Korean run businesses such as restaurants, cafés, hairdressing and beauty services are located within the suburb.

== History ==
Samuel Haslam owned various grants beside Haslams Creek from 1804. A railway station called Haslam's Creek was opened in this area in 1859, on the railway line from Sydney to Parramatta. Haslam's Creek is sometimes referred to as Haslem's Creek. Although it had not been intended to construct a station at Haslam's Creek, the then owner of the land where the station now stands, Father John Joseph Therry, together with nearby landholders Potts and Blaxland, agreed to pay £700 to enable its construction.

Haslam's Creek was the site of the first railway disaster in New South Wales in July 1858 which resulted in two deaths.

A large number of post-WWII European migrants, including a large number of Ukrainians, settled in the area of Lidcombe, and built a number of buildings including a church, 2 halls and 2 schools. Lidcombe is still the cultural centre of the Ukrainian community in Sydney. The population dynamics changed with the influx of Middle Eastern immigrants in the 1960s and 1970s.

The two main streets are John and Joseph, named after the early colonial priest John Joseph Therry.

In 1989, the former industrial area in the north of the suburb, near the shores of Homebush Bay, was carved out to become a separate suburb named "Homebush Bay", as part of efforts to regenerate this area. This area was selected as the main venue for the 2000 Summer Olympics, and in 2009 was renamed Sydney Olympic Park, with a small part becoming a new residential suburb of Wentworth Point. At the same time, a small part of Sydney Olympic Park that has remained industrial, around Carter Street, was carved back into the suburb of Lidcombe.

Auburn Council was suspended in 2016 due to dysfunction, and later in 2016 it was abolished, with different parts of the former council area merged into different councils. Most of Lidcombe became part of the new Cumberland Council, while the small industrial area that was formerly part of Sydney Olympic Park became part of the City of Parramatta.

== Heritage listings ==
Lidcombe has a number of heritage-listed sites, including:

- East Street: Rookwood Cemetery and Necropolis
- Joseph Street: Lidcombe Hospital Precinct

== Landmarks ==
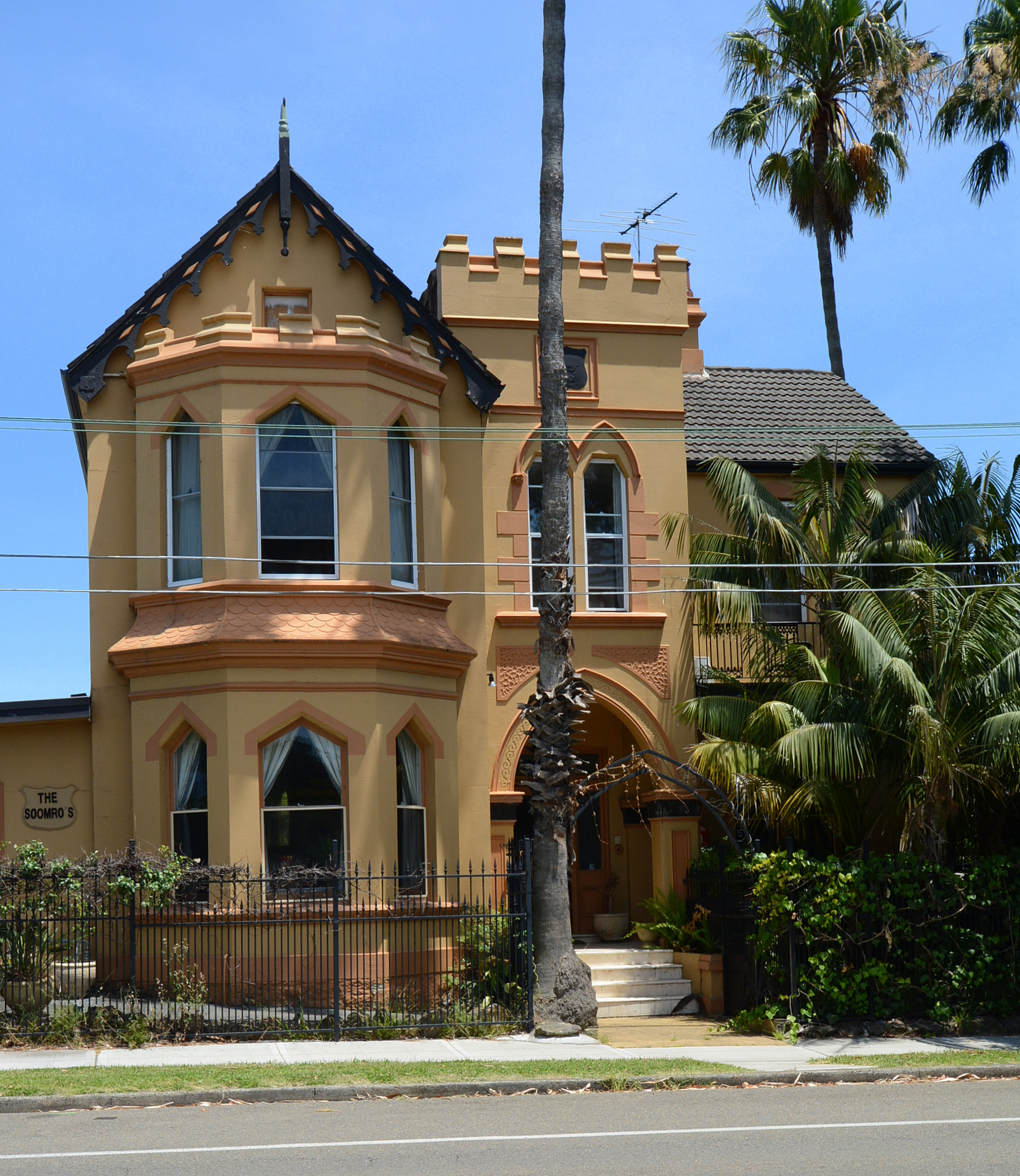
The Gables in East Street

North of the railway line:

- Church Street is the site for the St Andrews Ukrainian Catholic Church and its presbytery, hall, school and kindergarten, and the former Karpaty Ukrainian Credit Union.
- John Street is the site of the Ukrainian Youth Association's Centre and the Armenian Catholic Church.

South of the railway line:

- Joseph Street is the site for the Ukrainian National Hall and the Ukrainian Central School. Nearby is the office of "The Free Thought" Ukrainian newspaper.
- Railway Hotel is an Art Deco building in Joseph Street which has a State heritage listing.
- Lidcombe Hotel, John Street, is heritage-listed
- Royal Oak Hotel, Railway Street, is heritage-listed
- The Gables is a historic home in East Street, now used as a function centre. The house has a state heritage listing.
- Juniperina Juvenile Justice Centre on Rookwood Road is a juvenile detention centre for girls. It is the only detention facility catering for juvenile female offenders in New South Wales. The centre was also used as a filming location for the UK-Australian TV mini series, 'The Leaving of Liverpool'.
- Lidcombe Hospital was closed in the 1990s and was developed as a residential estate. The original complex was designed by Walter Liberty Vernon, Government Architect of the day, and built in 1906. It is now listed on the Register of the National Estate as well as being listed at a state level.
- Former Lidcombe Post Office, Joseph Street, is heritage-listed

== Churches ==
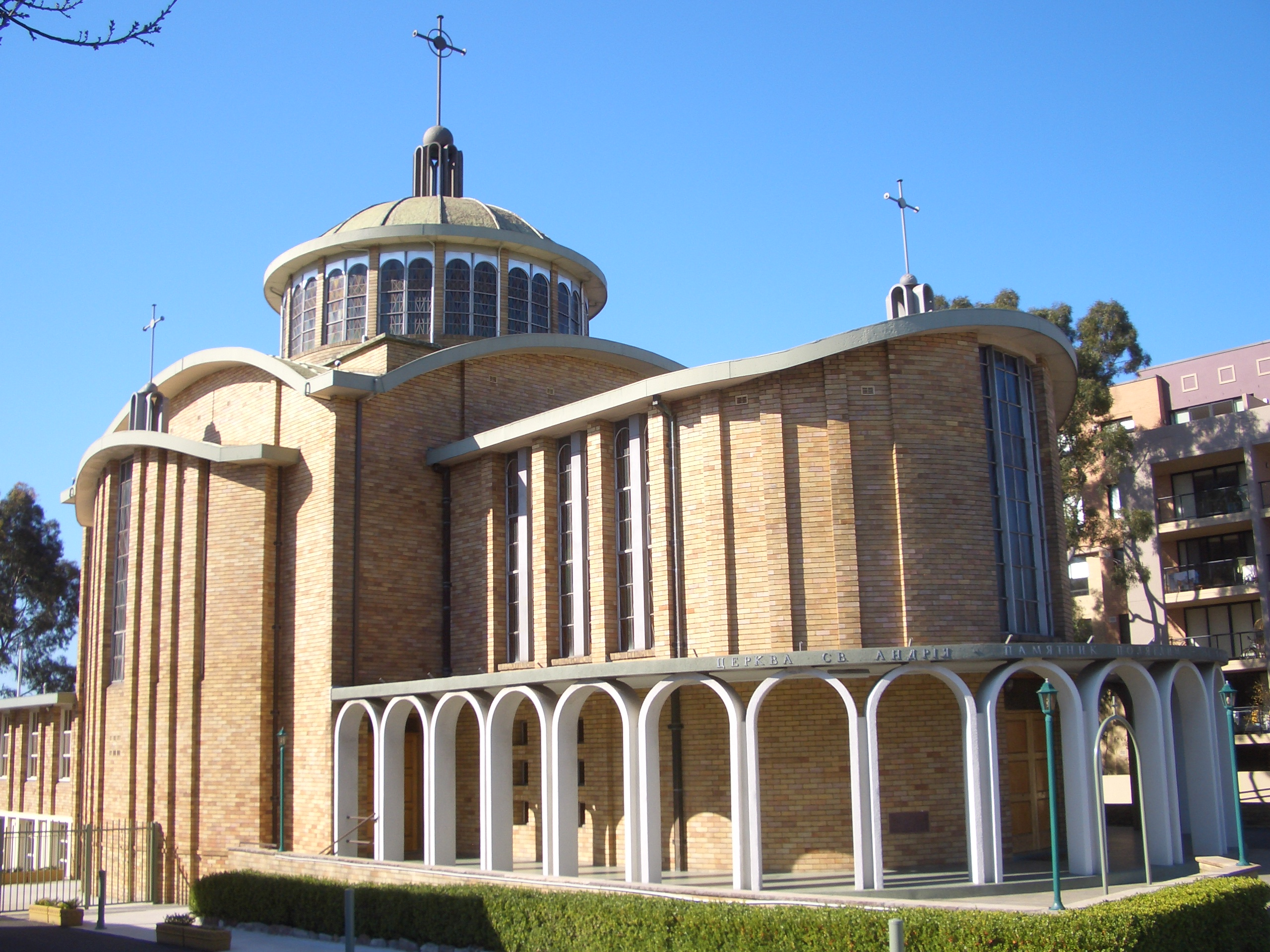
St Andrew's Ukrainian Catholic Church on Church Street

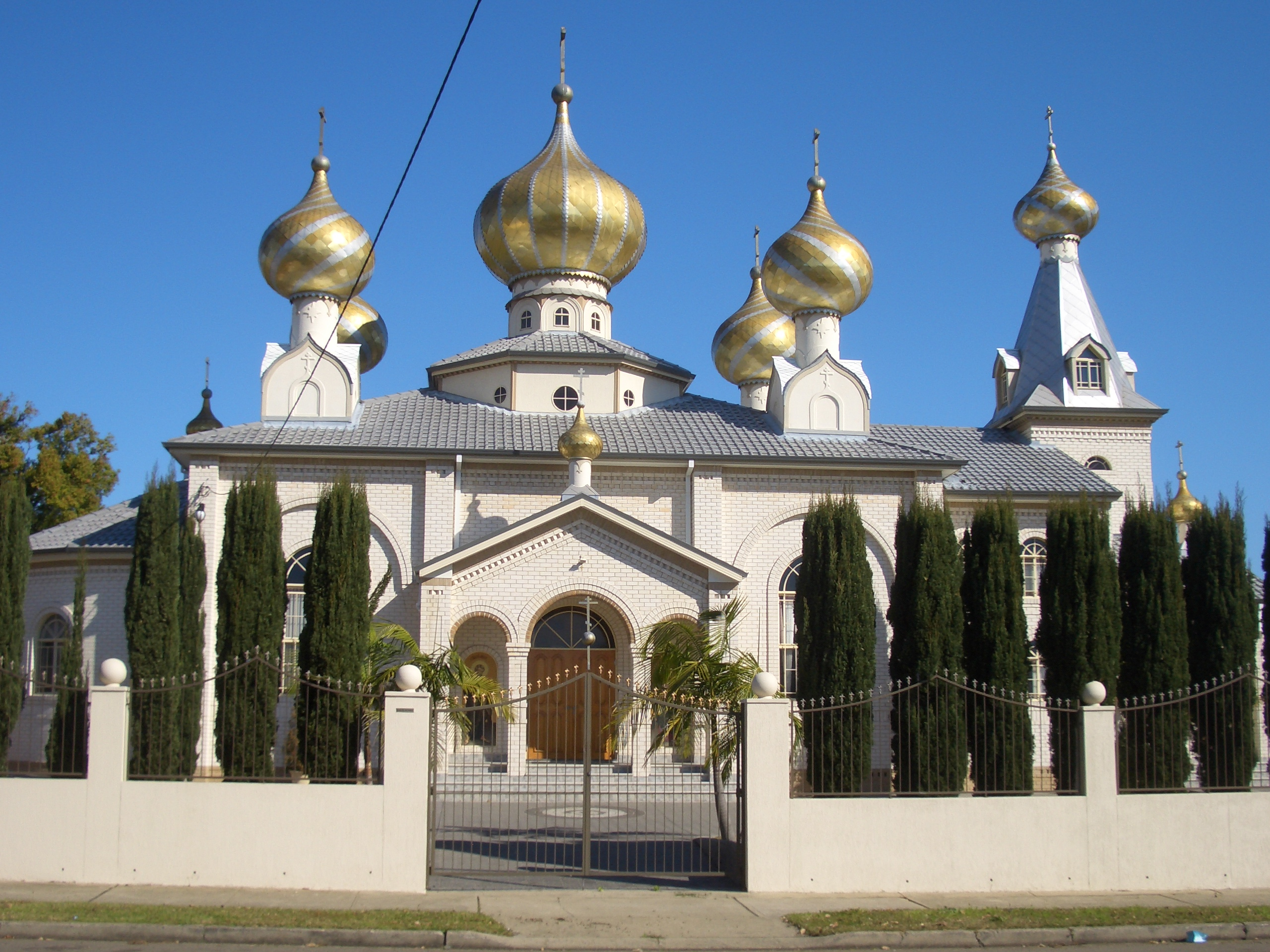
Russian Old Orthodox Church on Vaughan Street

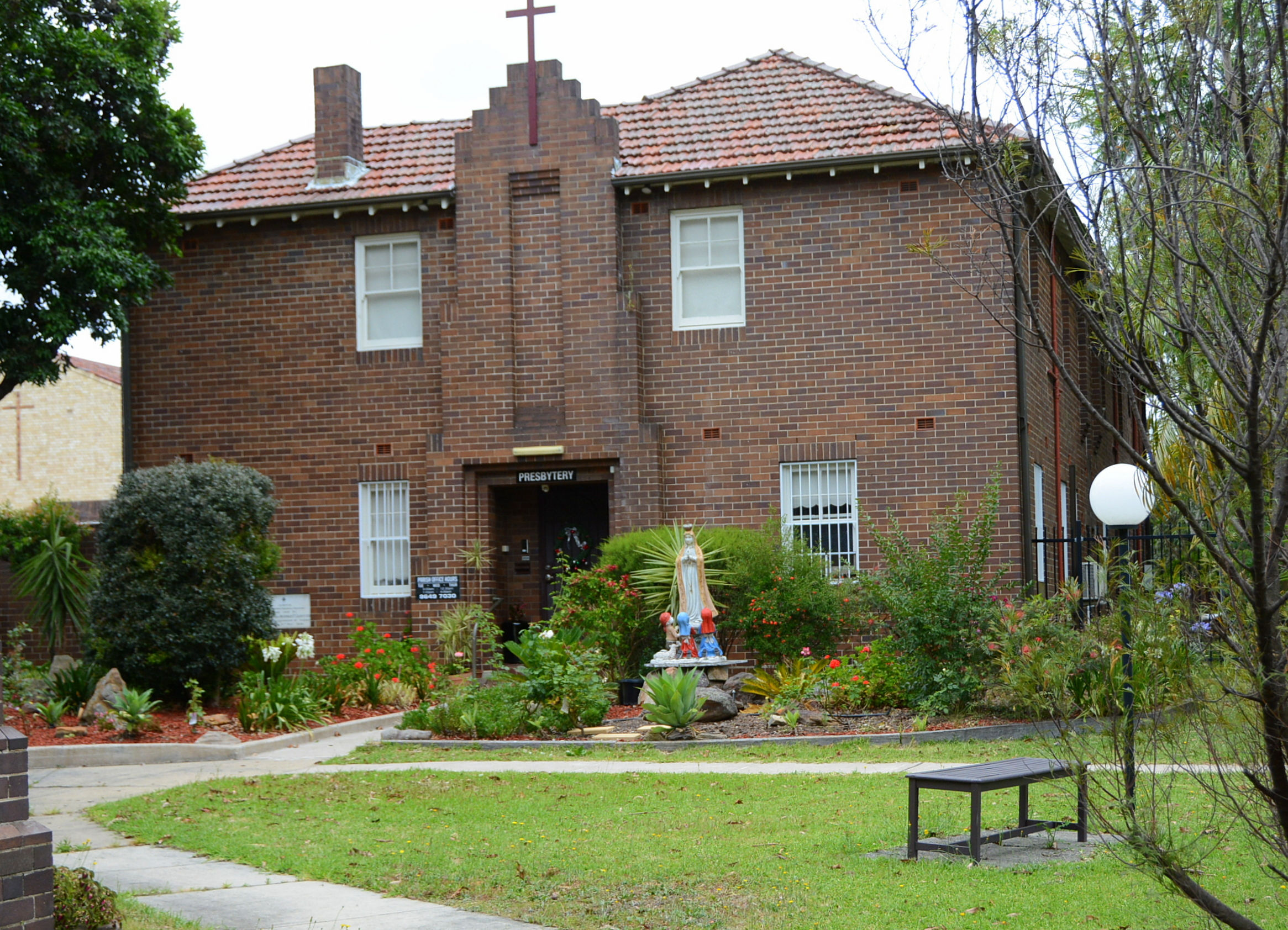
St Joachim's Catholic Church on John Street and Mills Street

Lidcombe has many places of worship including:

- Sydney Grace Church on 74 Joseph Street
- St Joachim's Catholic Church on John Street and Mills Street
- Sts Cyril and Methodius Slovak Catholic Church in Vaughan Street.
- St Andrew's Ukrainian Catholic Church (Byzantine style) on Church Street
- St Stephens Anglican Church on Mark Street
- The Slavic Evangelical Pentecostal Church on 5 Matthew Road
- Lidcombe Gospel Hall on 2 Neville Street
- Russian Orthodox Old Rite Church on Vaughan Street
- St Ephraim Syrian Orthodox Church on Joseph Street
- Lidcombe Baptist Church on Kerrs Road
- Our Lady of the Assumption Armenian Catholic Church on John Street
- Pacific Island Christian Church on Martin Street
- Christian Church on the corner of Olympic Drive and Vaughan Street
- GracePoint Presbyterian Church, on the corner of East and James Street
- St Marks Presbyterian Church in Yarram Street was closed
- Onnurri Korean Church in the Botanica Estate on Main Avenue
- Granville Community church on Good Street

== Schools ==
Lidcombe Public School, located on John Street, was established in 1879. The school has 600 students from the Lidcombe area and also caters for special education children with trained teachers in that field. The school provides extra-curricular education facilities such as a choir, dance group and PSSA sports team. There is a before and after-school care program located within the school. There is transport to and from the school by the 925 and 920 bus routes.

St Joachim's Parish School is a Catholic school on Mary Street. The Sisters of St Joseph founded the school in 1885 and remained active in the school until 1984. After that time the Sisters handed the Principalship over to lay staff who have continued to uphold the traditions and spirit of Blessed Mary MacKillop, who walked the playground and worked at the school, and her Josephite Sisters. The school caters for children up to Year 6.

St Andrews Ukranian School is a school on Church Street and is a part of St Andrew's Ukrainian Catholic Church. It was founded in 1969 by Ukranian immigrants after World War II to preserve their culture, and had an enrollment of 135 in 2024.

Marist Brothers was a boys school located on Keating Street, behind St. Joachim's Catholic Church. It closed following the amalgamation of several Catholic schools in the area. The school catered for boys up to Year 6. This site is used for various Catholic Church enterprises, including the Inner Western Regional Office of the Catholic Education Office, Sydney, the Catholic Adult Education Centre and a bookstore specialising in Catholic publications ("The Mustard Seed").

== Commercial area ==
Lidcombe has a mixture of residential, commercial and industrial developments. The main commercial area is clustered around the station. Lidcombe Shopping Centre (formerly Lidcombe Power Centre) is a medium-sized shopping centre located about 2 km from Lidcombe railway station. The centre features two mini-majors and approximately 60 specialty stores.

Commercial and industrial developments are located along Parramatta Road and surrounding areas. The area close to the train station has a lot of restaurants mainly offering Korean food.

== Industry ==
- Macquarie Goodman own a couple of business parks on Parramatta Road and Birnie Avenue.
- The Dairy Farmers' distribution centre is located at Birnie Avenue. Dairy Farmers is a milk co-operative and supplied most of NSW's milk before competition was opened to milk suppliers from other states.
- Arthur Street business park just on the border with Strathfield Municipality.
- Dooley's Lidcombe Catholic Club (there are franchises in Silverwater and Regents Park too)
- McVicar's Bus Services depot was located at the corner of Joseph and James Streets. It closed in 1978.
- The headquarters of ASX listed Nick Scali Furniture established in 1962. The company now sports furniture shops throughout all of Australia.
- The Tooheys Brewery is located on the corner of Parramatta Road and Nyrang Street. The brewery site was bought in 1955 and the company is now part of the Lion Nathan conglomerate. The smell of the hops is noticeable around the area as it wafts through the air, especially during the night.
- The NSW Rural Fire Service headquarters was in Carter Street but has now moved nearby to Murray Rose Ave in Sydney Olympic Park. Carter Street was part of Lidcombe before the 2000 Sydney Olympics, but later became part of Homebush Bay. On 2 October 2009, the suburb of Homebush Bay was dismantled into two new suburbs, Sydney Olympic Park and Wentworth Point, with Carter Street reabsorbed into Lidcombe. The Olympic site was once a stockyard and abattoir.

== Transport ==
=== Trains ===
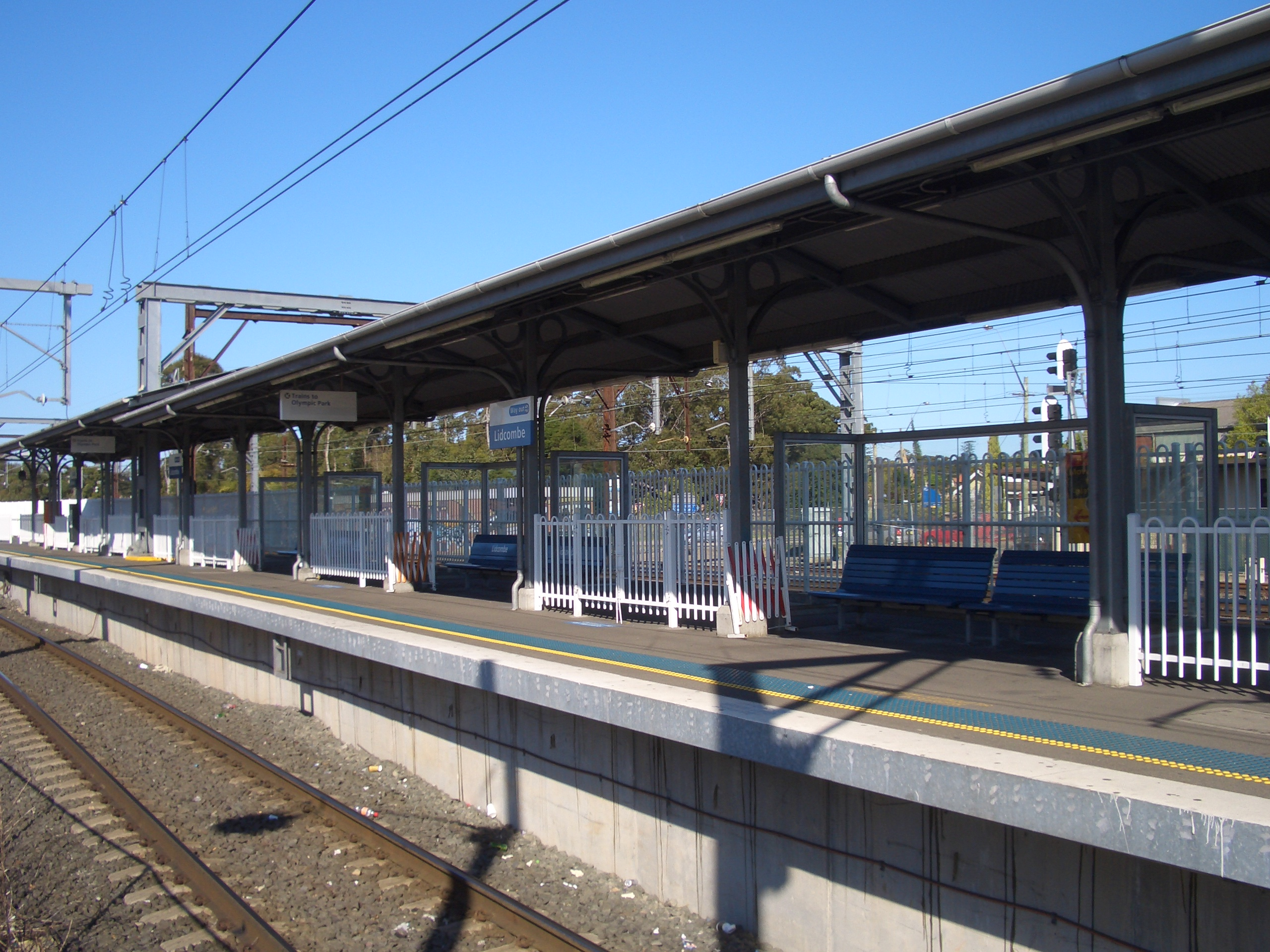
Lidcombe Railway Station Olympic Park platform

Lidcombe railway station is an important junction station. It is served by four suburban lines.

Some intercity Blue Mountains line services also call at the station.

A railway service from the Mortuary railway station, near Central railway station, once ran to a platform at the nearby Rookwood Cemetery, on the Rookwood Cemetery railway line but has since closed.

=== Bus services ===
Transit Systems runs one route, Transdev NSW runs three routes and NightRide runs three routes via Lidcombe station. For full details of these services see Lidcombe Station.

== Sport and recreation ==
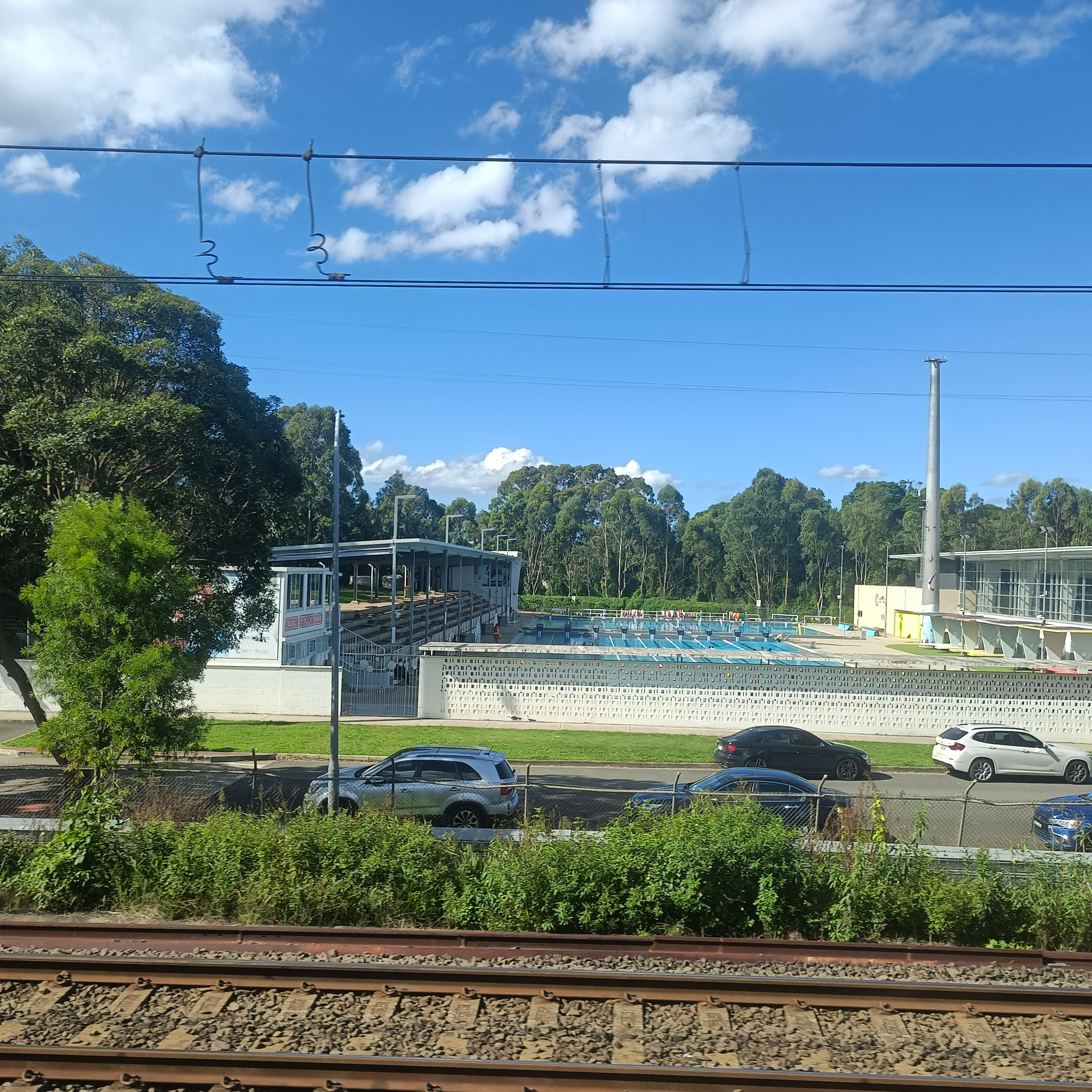
Lidcombe pool in 2026

=== Lidcombe Oval ===
Lidcombe Oval, situated in Church Street, on the northern side of the railway line, was the home ground of the Western Suburbs Magpies from 1967 to 1986. The playing surface is enclosed by a cycling track. The ground earned a reputation as a fortress for the home side, particularly in the late 1970s to the early 1980s when the Magpies were at their most competitive. Games against rivals Parramatta Eels and Manly-Warringah Sea Eagles would usually draw large crowds during this era. The attendance record for the venue is 21,015 (Wests vs Parramatta, 30 July 1978).

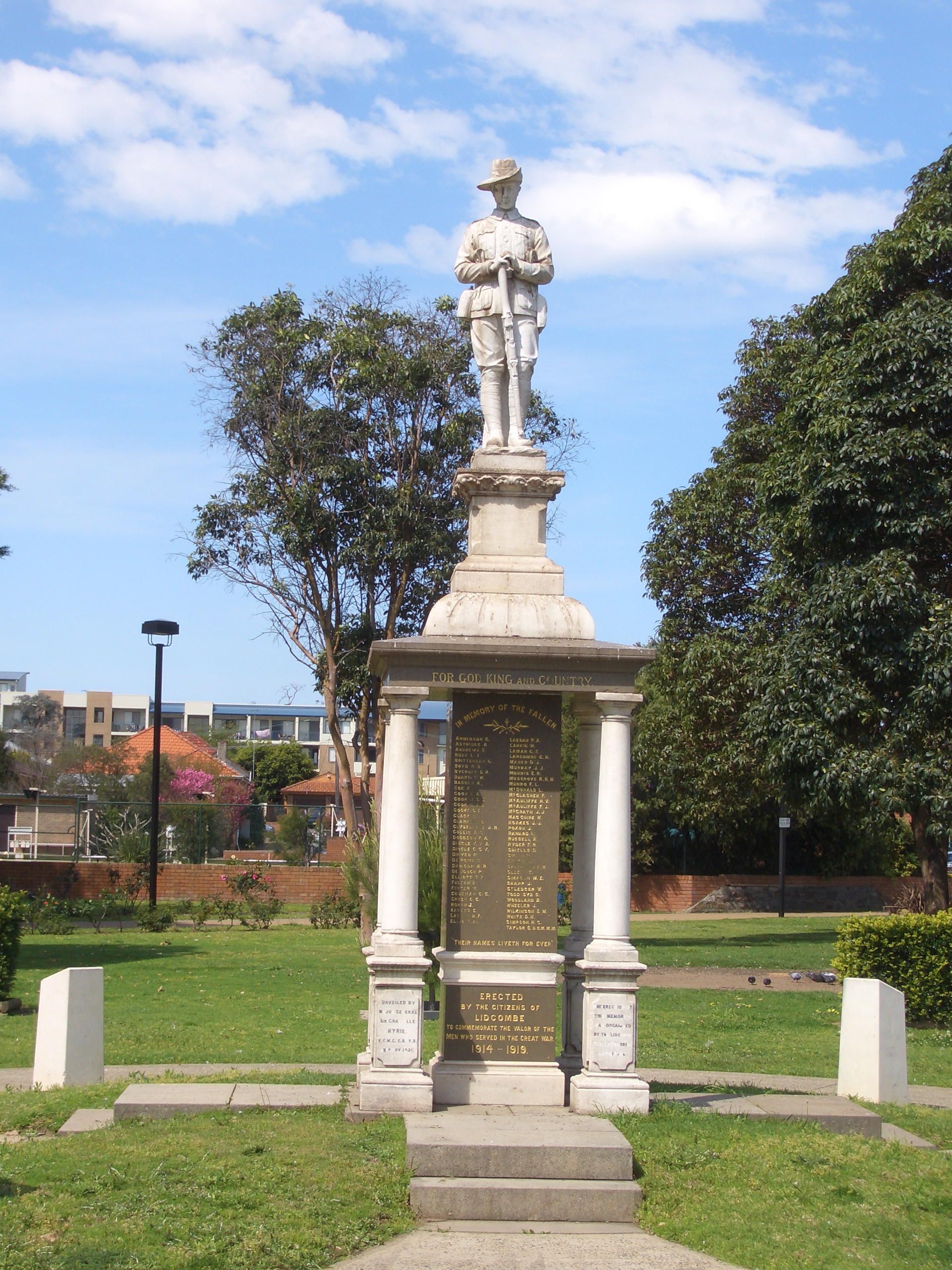
War Memorial in Lidcombe Remembrance Park, corner of James and Joseph Streets

=== Carnarvon Golf Course ===
Carnarvon Golf Course, located at Nottinghill Road and Joseph Street, reflects the social history of Lidcombe. The first site was in use from 1927 to 1932 and occupied an area running east and west on the northern side of Parramatta Road, Lidcombe between Wetherill Street and Hill Road in an area currently covered by the M4 Western Motorway. The "Old Course" was in an area of three paddocks north of Fariola Street in an area owned by the Newington State Hospital (now Silverwater Correctional Centre) which consisted of nine holes in the top paddock (holes one-eight and eighteen). Seven holes in the bottom paddock, now Wilson Park, and the sixteenth and seventeenth holes in a paddock leased from Lidcombe Council on the southern side of Holker Street. This course was in use from 1932 until early 1943 when the top paddock and the Clubhouse were taken over by the U.S. Navy during World War II. The Silverwater Course was used from 1942 to 1949 and was a nine-hole course where the bottom paddock held holes one-two and five-nine with the third and fourth holes in the Council paddock. The present site which originally consisted of Lidcombe Sports and Showground and the western grazing paddock of Lidcombe State Hospital was obtained in 1947 and officially opened in December, 1949.

=== Ruth Everuss Aquatic Centre ===
The Ruth Everuss Aquatic Centre (formerly known as the Auburn Swim Centre), located on Church Street, has indoor and outdoor swimming facilities. The centre was closed for major renovations and reopened again in 2017. The centre is named after Ruth Everuss, the Australian Olympic swimmer was part of the silver medal-winning women's 4 × 100 m freestyle relay team at the 1960 Summer Olympics in Rome. Under the rules of the time, she did not receive a medal for swimming in the heats.

== Notable residents ==
- Alberto Domínguez (1934–2001), Uruguayan and Australian cyclist and radio presenter for SBS Radio. Victim of the September 11 attacks.
- Naazmi Johnston (1988–), An Olympic and Commonwealth gymnast. Represented Australia at the 2008 Olympic Games, the 2006, and 2010 Commonwealth Games.
- Rod Taylor (1930–2015), For some years after his Hollywood success, his mother still lived at a local street (reference: Schoolfriends messageboard, now inactive). He went to Parramatta High School.

== Notes ==
- Mitchell, John (2008) 'John Joseph Therry – His Lidcombe Property' Australian Railway History, September, 2008 pp. 308–310
- NSW Parliament (2003) Legislative Assembly Hansard Full Day Transcript: Parramatta High School
- Pollen, Frances (1990) The Book of Sydney Suburbs, Angus & Robertson Publishers, Australia ISBN 0-207-14495-8
- Stafford, Ted (1991) Living in Liddy Ettalong Beach, NSW ISBN 0-646-05153-9
