= Richmond–Kurrajong railway line =

Railway line in Sydney, Australia

Kurrajong Line
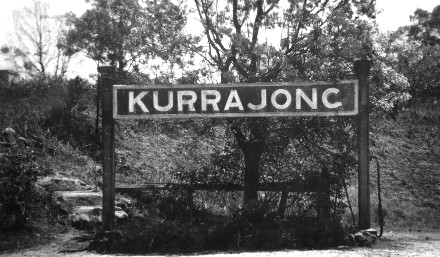
- The station sign at Kurrajong (circa 1950).

Overview
- Termini: Richmond; Kurrajong
- Stations: 6

Service
- Operator: New South Wales Government Railways

History
- Opened: 8 November 1926
- Closed: 26 July 1952

Technical
- Track gauge: 4 ft 8 1/2 in (1,435 mm)

The Kurrajong railway line was a railway line in the distant rural western suburbs of Sydney, Australia. It was an extension of the branch off the Main Western line from Blacktown to Richmond and was operated by the New South Wales Government Railways.

== Construction ==
The construction of the railway between Richmond and Kurrajong did not receive parliamentary authorisation until 1919, by which time roads were being improved to a standard that did not warrant a railway to bring the produce of the area west of the Hawkesbury River to the Sydney market. From its opening in 1926 until its closure in 1952, it remained a minor branch line.

Lobbying for an extension of the Richmond line to Kurrajong began in 1884, but the high cost of bridging the flood-prone Hawkesbury River, and the limited amount of agricultural land available, delayed construction.

Finally, political lobbying by local landholders paid off and the first sod was turned on 2 June 1923. Regular passenger trains began running on 8 November 1926, although the official opening took place on 20 November 1926.

== Route description ==
The branch began in the back platform at Richmond and continued across East Market Street on a level crossing which was protected by a station employee with a red flag or red light. It then passed around Richmond Oval, continuing in a north west direction along March Street, at the far end of which it left the town centre and entered its own right of way. That dropped through a cutting towards the river on a 1 in 50 grade, before making its way across the alluvial soil of the level floodplain. Trains were running to that point by April 1925.

Gravel trains ran from the Nepean Sand and Gravel Siding, located just before the line crossed the Old Kurrajong Road. The material was being used in the construction of Sydney Harbour Bridge.

A very short passenger platform was located on the eastern bank of the Hawkesbury river. It opened in 1928 with the misnomer of Nepean Bridge, and was renamed Phillip in 1934. The location was a favourite swimming and picnic spot.

The railway bridge over the Hawkesbury River was erected on concrete piers which were an extension of those supporting the adjacent road bridge. Upon leaving the river, the line ascended on a 1-in-36 grade through the western river bank and reached Bells Line of Road which it crossed at a 45-degree angle and entered North Richmond station, which had a 200-foot (61 m) long platform with shelter and a goods siding.

After leaving the station, the railway continued in a straight alignment, largely through the property of farmers. Being classed as a "pioneer line", the route was unfenced and the rails second-hand, laid on wooden sleepers with ash ballast. Stopping locations were established between North Richmond and Kurrajong at locations which, in 1928, were named Red Cutting, Kemsleys, Thompsons Ridge, Nurri and Duffys. The line through those locations passed orchards and small farms as it slowly climbed into what is the foothills of the Blue Mountains.

Embankments and cuttings became a feature of the line as it headed towards its terminus, Kurrajong station, which was located on a site carved from the side of the ridge on which the village was situated. A concrete slab station building stood on the platform. There was a run-round loop, and looped goods siding which served a goods shed and hand crane.

== Operations ==
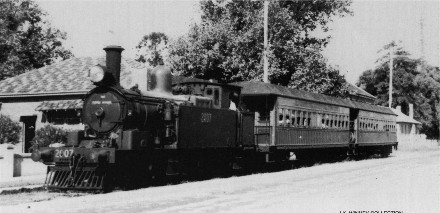
A Kurrajong-bound two-car passenger train trundles along March Street in Richmond (circa 1950).

The regular passenger train on the railway consisted of a Z20-class tank locomotive hauling two carriages. Just like the Camden line, the train was given the nickname "Pansy". The 7-mile (11 km) journey was timed to take between 30 and 35 minutes. Mixed trains were given extra time, to allow for the possible need to shunt at North Richmond or the Nepean Gravel siding.

However, trains of up to five carriages ran to Kurrajong on public holidays. Phillip station was well patronised, and bushwalkers could take advantage of the halts between North Richmond and Kurrajong. Often carriages would be detached at Kurrajong, to return on later trains when the patronage was increased. The gravel trains were usually hauled by a D50-class locomotive which could haul 640 tons from the siding.

The speed limit for passenger and mixed was just 20 mph (32 km/h), with a 10 mph (16 km/h) limit along March Street and through the park opposite Richmond station. The gravel trains were limited to 10 and 5 mph (16 and 8 km/h) respectively.

Safeworking was by means of Ordinary Train Staff, but it was permissible to operate gravel trains between Richmond and the siding whilst the staff was secured at Kurrajong.

Very little freight was handled on the line beyond Hawkesbury River. It was far more convenient for orchardists to use road freight to the Sydney markets, because that provided the opportunity for back loading of fertiliser and other farm requisites.

Whilst the line was initially considered a country branch line, from 10 October 1941 it was brought into the Sydney Metropolitan fare scales, which permitted reduced off-peak returns and child weekend excursions.

== Closure ==
The closing date was not one with the usual advance notice. Heavy rain on the weekend of 12 and 13 June 1952, caused the Hawkesbury River to flood and, as was usual with such occurrences, the railway service was suspended. More flooding followed in the following weeks and a bus was substituted on the Kurrajong side of the river, with a floodboat ferrying passengers across the flooded stream. A cutting near the terminus had collapsed and, despite constant efforts, would not stabilise until prolonged dry weather returned.

Consequently, it was announced that, in view of the damage to the line and the fact that the line was never a commercial success, it would not reopen. Protest meetings occurred, but finally, on 17 September 1952, the newly appointed Commissioner for Railways, Reg Winsor, gave the official notification. The total annual income of the line was less than the cost of repairs.

== Kurrajong Line stations ==
- 33°35′57″S 150°45′11″E Richmond
- 33°35′11″S 150°43′32″E Phillip
- 33°34′45″S 150°43′00″E North Richmond
- 33°34′27″S 150°41′35″E Kemsleys
- 33°34′00″S 150°40′52″E Thompsons Ridge
- 33°33′44″S 150°39′43″E Duffys
- 33°33′18″S 150°39′57″E Kurrajong
