= Woronora Cemetery railway station =

Former railway station in New South Wales, Australia

Woronora Cemetery
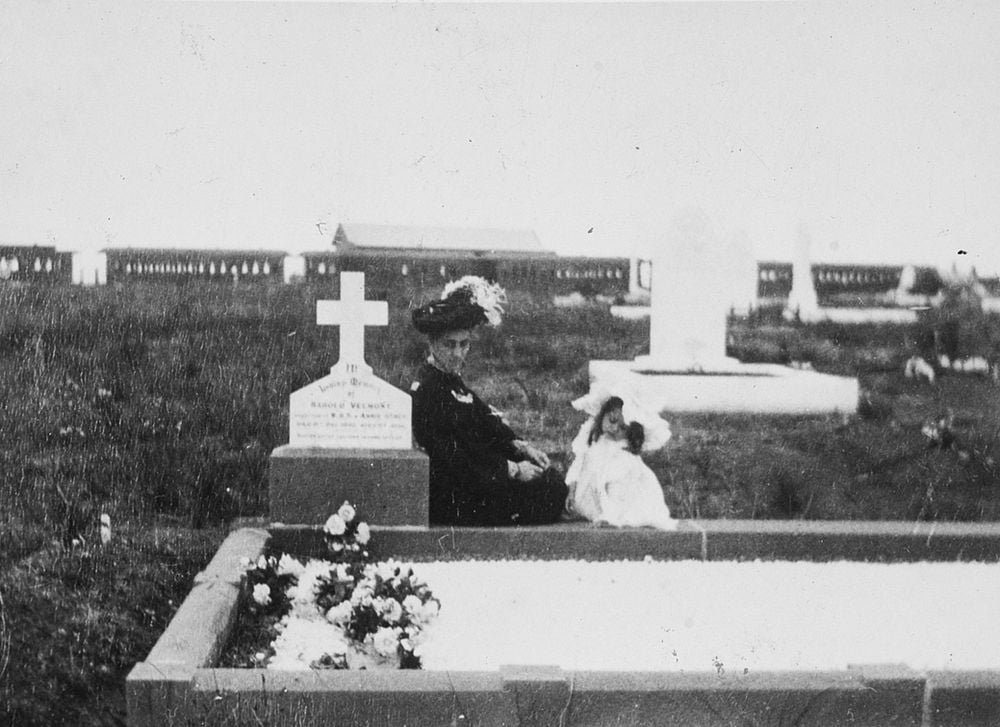
- One of only two known pictures of the railway station

General information
- Location: Woronora, Sydney, New South Wales; Australia
- Coordinates: 34°01′56″S 151°02′56″E
- Operator: Department of Railways
- Line: Woronora Cemetery
- Distance: 25.380 kilometres (15.770 mi) from Central
- Platforms: 1
- Tracks: 1

Construction
- Structure type: Ground

Other information
- Status: Demolished

History
- Opened: 13 June 1900
- Closed: 23 May 1947

Services
Preceding station	Former services	Following station
Terminus	Woronora Cemetery Line	Sutherland towards Regent Street
Location

Woronora Cemetery railway station was a funerary railway station on the Illawarra railway line in New South Wales, Australia. The station served the Woronora Memorial Park. The station opened months after the first burial in 1900, and closed in 1947 due to the rising popularity in funeral motor cars.

The station itself consisted of a 134m brick platform with a wooden building. After closure, the station was demolished and the tracks removed.

== See also ==
- Regent Street railway station, a starting point for funeral trains to Woronora.
