= Cemetery Station No. 4 railway station =

Railway stop in Sydney, Australia

Coordinates: 33.8739°S 151.0597°E

Cemetery Station No. 4 was a railway station on Sydney's Rookwood Cemetery railway line. It served the Rookwood Cemetery.

== Station setup ==
The station opened on 15 June 1908 and closed on 29 December 1948. It ran through the Jewish section of the Rookwood Cemetery past the Rookwood Crematorium, which was shielded from the trains by a decorative columbarium wall west of the building. The station terminated with a siding at the Anglican and General Office that opened in the 1930s.

The station had a single 530 ft (160 m) platform with a small building containing a waiting room, restrooms and a room containing the Electric Train Staff instruments. There are several photographs of this station held in the N.S.W. Transport Archives.

== Working of trains ==
Loop sidings were provided at the station opposite the train platform. The branch line terminated in a dead-end beyond No. 4 Mortuary Station, and a dead-end siding was provided at the terminal end. The loop siding standing room was 654 ft (199 m), terminal dead-end at 595 ft (181 m), and dead-end siding at 645 ft (197 m).

All points at the station were worked by ball lever, and secured by standard clip and S.L. lock when not in use. The station contained a down home signal that was worked from a lever fixed at the foot of the ramp at the Lidcombe end of the platform.

Electric train staff miniature type instruments were in operation on the line. The instrument at No. 4 Mortuary Station was equipped to work manually and automatically.

When it was necessary for a train or trains to be run on the Branch, the Station-master, Lidcombe, delivered to the Guard of the first train the Key to operate the locks, and the Guard had to ensure that he received that Key, except when an employee was deputed by the Station-master, Lidcombe, to take charge at No. 4 Mortuary Station, when that employee obtained the Key from, and returned it to the Station-master, Lidcombe.

No more than four trains were allowed on the Branch between Lidcombe and No. 4 Mortuary Station at one and the same time, and a strict policy was in place when trains were running.

Electric Train Staff Working introduced 11 November 1918—replacing the Staff and Ticket system (26 May 1897) thereby allowing three trains to operate upon the branch. In Aug. 1924, No. 4 Mortuary Stations capacity increased. An additional refuge siding (the dead-end siding) allowed four trains to run on the Branch.

The Electric Staffs, small metal rods held in Staff Instruments. The Branch was a single section (designated 'A'), Lidcombe Signal-box (5 Staffs) and No. 4 Mortuary Station (5 Staffs). Only one Staff could be released from the Instrument at any one time. Once the Staff for the section was placed back in the Instrument at the opposite end of the section was the line was, and only then could another be withdrawn. The Staffs were numbered 1 to 10 (Lidcombe / No. 4 Mortuary Station).

== Other sources ==
Friends of Rookwood, RIP – Rookwood in Profile (Newsletter of the Friends of Rookwood, Inc) Vol 1, Sept 1996

== Neighbouring stations ==
Preceding station	Former services	Following station
Terminus	Rookwood Cemetery Line	Cemetery Station No. 3 towards Regent Street
