= Rookwood Cemetery railway line =

Railway in Sydney, Australia

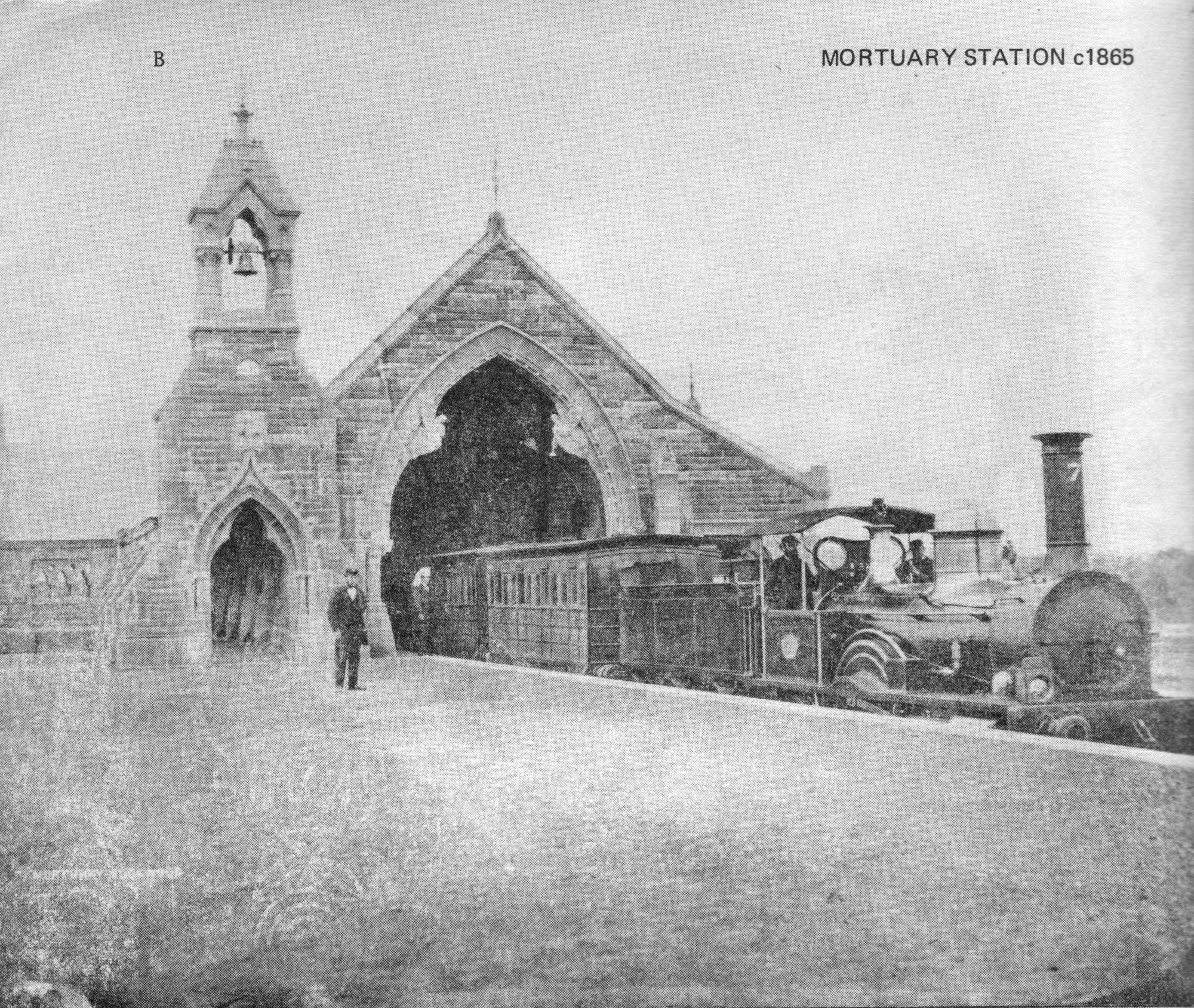
Haslem's Creek Cemetery station (Cemetery Station No. 1) c. 1865

Map

The Rookwood Cemetery Line used to be a part of the Sydney suburban network. The line serviced Rookwood Cemetery and was built in 1864, opening on 22 October 1864.

== History ==
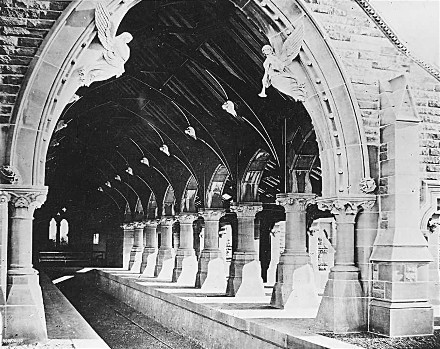
Detail of Archway and platform

With the closure of the Town Hall and Devonshire Cemeteries by the mid-19th century and an ever-increasing population, a decision was made to purchase a 250 acres (100 ha) area of land in 1862 to establish the Necropolis at Haslem's Creek in 1867.

As this location was some distance from the centre of Sydney and from the main-line train station at Haslem's Creek, now Lidcombe station, it was considered necessary to establish a railway station at the centre of the cemetery. This line would run as a spur line from the existing station at Haslem's creek and allow easier movement into and out of the cemetery. The railway line construction began in November 1864 and from 1 January 1865 trains began their run into the cemetery. However, The Sydney Morning Herald advertised the first regular services from 1 April 1867. The times advertised were for services at 8.30 am and 4.15 pm. Later this was changed to 9.15 am and 3 pm. It stopped at prearranged stations on the journey from central Sydney in order to pick up mourners and coffins. Some stations, such as Newtown had special platform areas and buildings reserved for mourners and coffins.

At the time of its opening, the line went as far as Cemetery Station No. 1. On 26 May 1897, an extension of the line to Cemetery Station No. 3 was opened. The extension required the removal of a waiting room on the rear wall of the Cemetery Station No. 1, so the line could pass right through the building. A final extension, to Cemetery Station No. 4 opened on 19 June 1908. The line closed in 1948.

=== Closure ===
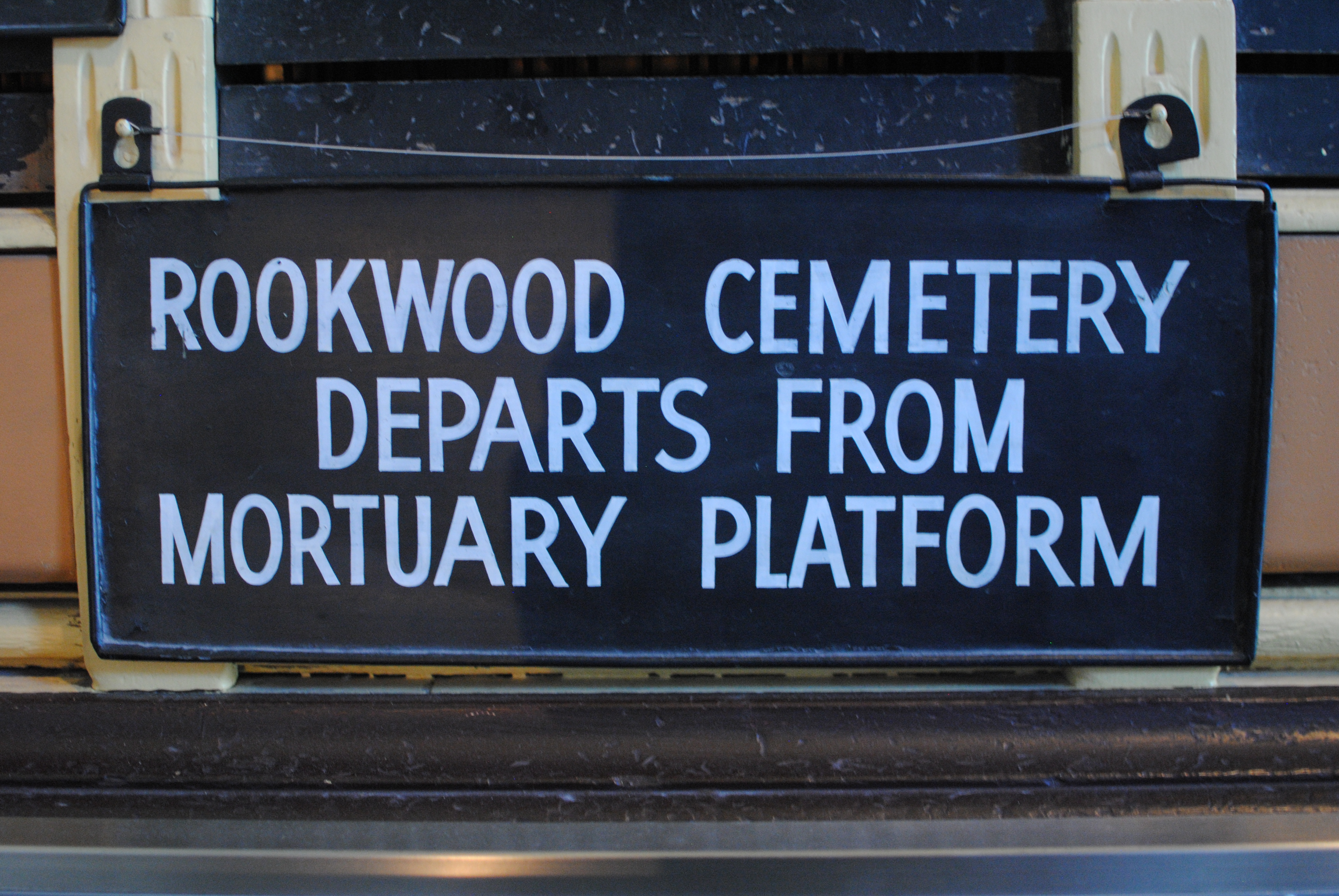
Signage from Central station, now in the Powerhouse Museum

The last trains that ran funeral processions all but ceased in the late 1930s. Following this, they were only used for visitors on Sundays and Mother's Day. The service was briefly revived during World War II during petrol rationing. The last railway timetable was recorded in 1947 and read Sydney 2.17 pm to Strathfield 2.33 pm to Rookwood No. 1, 2.50 pm.

On 3 April 1948, the service was officially terminated while the spur was recorded as closed on 29 December 1948. The tracks remained until the 1980s, with the line used to transport stonework.

== Rookwood Cemetery line stations ==
Station names are based on the current name of the station, or the name of the station when it was closed.

- Regent Street
- Cemetery Station No. 1
- Cemetery Station No. 2
- Cemetery Station No. 3
- Cemetery Station No. 4
