= Regent Street railway station =

Railway station in Sydney, Australia

Regent Street
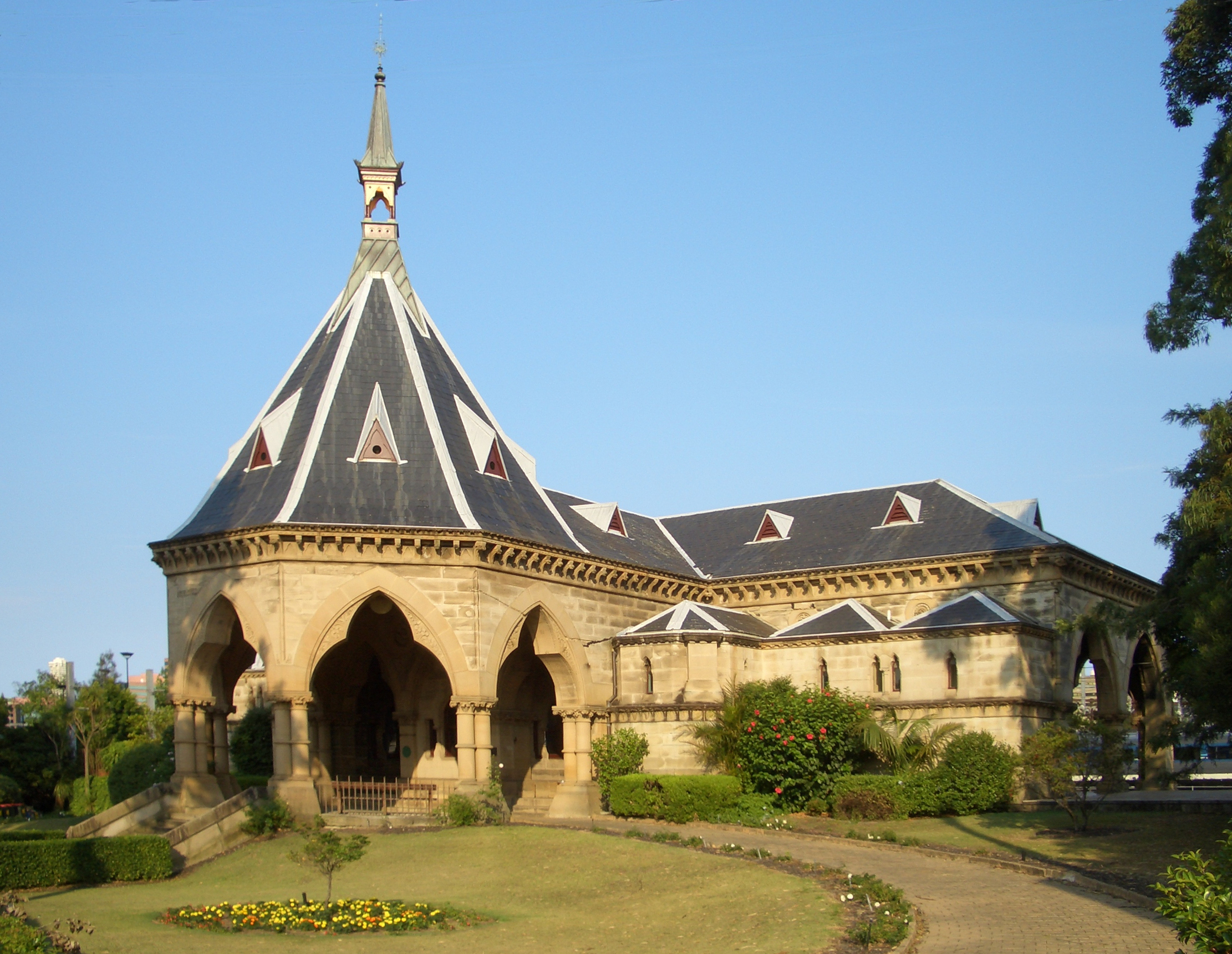
- Regent Street Railway Station, also known as the Mortuary Station

General information
- Location: Regent Street, Chippendale (Map)
- Coordinates: 33°53′12″S 151°12′09″E
- Owner: Transport Asset Holding Entity
- Line: Rozelle–Darling Harbour
- Platforms: 1
- Tracks: 1

Construction
- Architectural style: Australian closed station

Other information
- Status: Reused

History
- Opened: 29 June 1869
- Rebuilt: 21 April 1985
- Former names: Mortuary (1869-1938)

Services
Preceding station	Former services	Following station
Cemetery Station No. 1 towards Cemetery Station No. 4	Rookwood Cemetery Line	Terminus
Sutherland towards Woronora Cemetery	Woronora Cemetery Line	Terminus
Location

Regent Street railway station
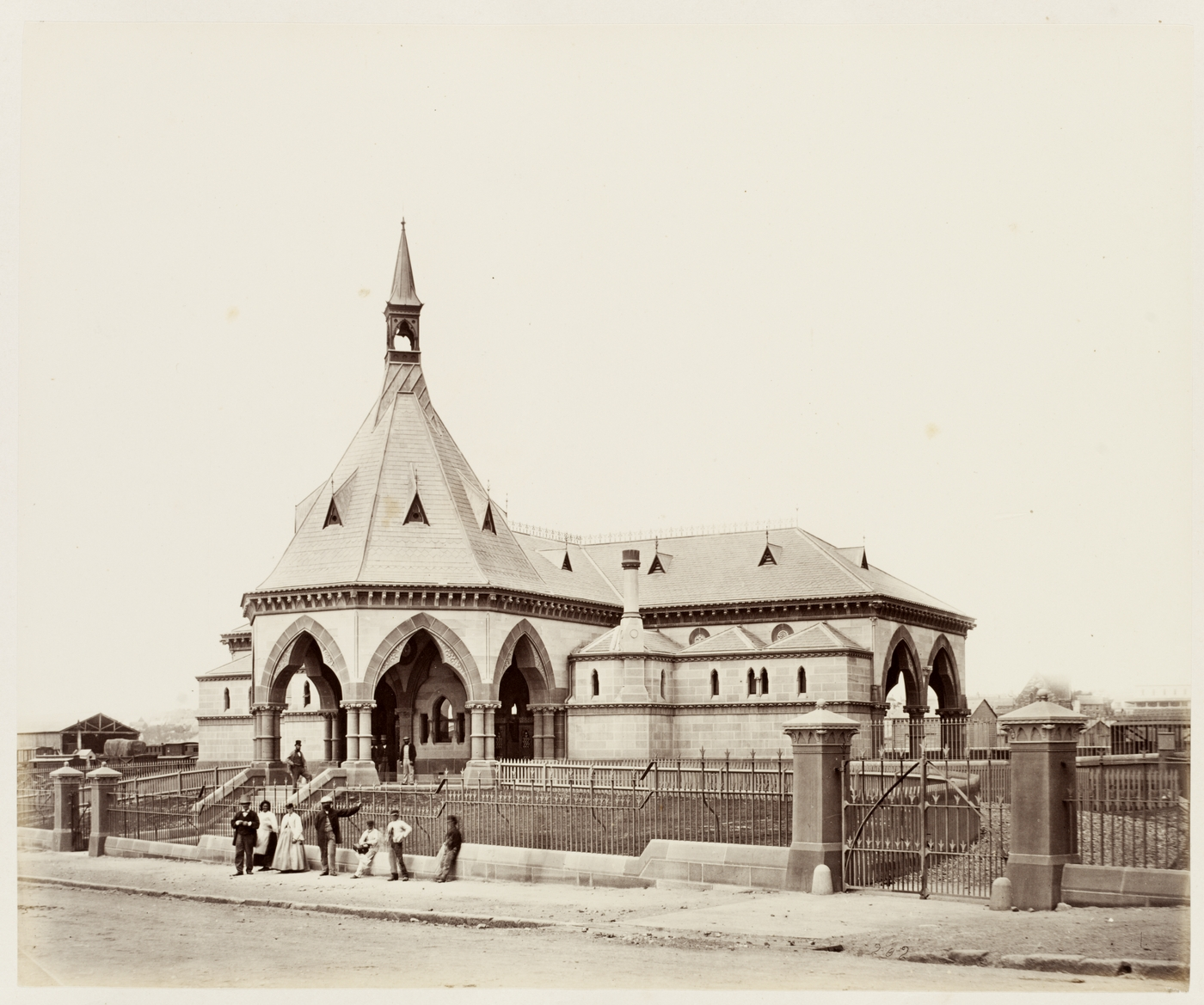
- Mortuary station in 1872

- Location within inner Sydney

General information
- Status: Completed
- Type: Former railway station
- Architectural style: Victorian Free Gothic
- Coordinates: 33°53′12″S 151°12′08″E
- Construction started: 1868
- Completed: 22 March 1869
- Opened: June 1869
- Client: New South Wales Government Railways
- Owner: Government of New South Wales

Technical details
- Material: Sydney sandstone; Carrara marble; Australian red cedar

Design and construction
- Architect: James Barnet (1868–1869)
- Architecture firm: Colonial Architect of New South Wales
- Developer: Government of New South Wales
- Main contractor: Stoddart & Medways
- Designations: NSW State Heritage Register; Register of the National Estate (defunct register)

Regent Street railway station, formerly the Mortuary railway station, is a railway station in Sydney from which funeral trains departed for the Rookwood Cemetery railway line serving Rookwood Cemetery. The station found later use as a part of Sydney Yard.

The ornate Gothic station stands on the western side of Sydney Yard at Chippendale, close to Central railway station and Railway Square. It was added to the New South Wales State Heritage Register on 2 April 1999.

== History ==
The station opened as Mortuary on 29 June 1869. From 1938, it was known as Regent Street, after the street on which it is located. It has also been referred to by different names, including the Necropolis Receiving Station and the Mortuary Station. The track to Regent Street branches off the Rozelle–Darling Harbour Goods Line right after the line begins at Sydney Yard.

The Mortuary station was built as part of the larger Rookwood Cemetery line. It was completed on 22 March 1869 but had been used since 1 January 1869. It was also one end of the service that ran to the Woronora Cemetery in Sutherland, located south of Sydney, and for trains heading to Sandgate Cemetery in Newcastle.

This and the Receiving House station at Rookwood Cemetery were designed by colonial architect James Barnet in the Victorian Free Gothic style, using elements from the Venetian 13th-century Gothic style. Principal sculptors Thomas Ducket and Henry Apperly worked on the elaborate carvings that were a feature of the stations, including angels, cherubs, and gargoyles. Although both buildings were designed to look like churches, both in structure and in the symbolic elements that adorned them, they were never used as places of worship.

=== 1938: Closure of line and renaming as Regent Street railway station ===
The building was used as the terminus for funeral trains till 1938 only. When the rail funeral business gave way to road corteges and motor hearses, rail services were restricted to weekends, and then finally curtailed. On 3 April 1948, trains were withdrawn and the cemetery line closed. Trains left from the main terminus platforms over the final ten years of the funeral rail service. There being no call for the rail hearse, the Mortuary Station ceased to function in the capacity of its original purpose.

From 14 March 1938, Mortuary Station was used for the consignment of horses and dogs, and its name changed to Regent Street.

From February 1950, it was used as a parcels dispatch, at which time catenary wires were placed inside the rail pavilion and (apparently at this same time) the easternmost arches at either end were removed of ornament on the inner face to allow for the passage of larger rail vehicles. The sight of an electric mail vehicle standing under the arches was common in the 1950s and 1960s.

=== 1985: Restoration and heritage listing ===
Regent Street railway station was restored by the State Rail Authority in 1985. By this time, it had also been classified by the National Trust of Australia and the Australian Heritage Commission and made part of Permanent Conservation by the Heritage Council of New South Wales. The cost of restoring the site was approximately A$600,000. It was reopened on 21 April 1985 by Premier Neville Wran.

From 1986 to 1989, a pancake restaurant, the Magic Mortuary was operated using railway carriages to house the diners. For this purpose, two dining cars, an event car (for exhibitions and theatrical presentations) and a staff amenities car were located on the tracks alongside the platform. Associated crafts and gifts were sold from the ticket office and displays mounted on the platform areas.

=== 21st century ===
Subsequently, the station has occasionally been used as a venue to launch special train services and informative displays, and as a hired function centre. In the early 2000s, the platform was shortened at the northern end to make way for a bus terminus.

As part of the construction of the Sydney Metro City & Southwest, a bridge was built across the southern end of the platform in 2018.

== Description ==
The station building is predominantly constructed from sandstone; two varieties of colour being used – brown for all columns, cornices, etc. and white for the plain surfaces. It consists of a long low-roofed pavilion of nine bays covering a single railway track that enters and leaves the building through a wide Gothic arch at either end. A second arch at either end provides access to the raised stone platform that occupies half the sheltered area. An octagonal pavilion of open arches serves as a port cochere on the street side of the platform; its steeply pitched roof resolves into a delicate fleche, which rises above the rest of the building to give the station a landmark character. The outer wall of the platform pavilion (on the eastern side of the railway track) is composed of nine great arches on banded cylindrical columns with leafy capitals.

The columns rise from square tapered bases, each a huge block as high as the human figure. At the corners of the pavilion, the arches rest on squared piers that are twice the bulk of the columns. The piers have enriched stringcourses with stiff-leaf detail like the column capitals. The spandrels between the arches contain circular medallions with carved centre. Walls are of plain ashlar courses, rising to a highly ornamented corbel table Winds with a high-pitched roof rising into a square fleche set on the diagonal, which acts as a bell turret. The balance of the arches and strong cornice-line with the sweep of the roof makes for a great architecture. In the angles between the octagonal porch and the station pavilion are set the less formal structures of rest rooms and toilets; the chimneys of the rest room fireplaces accentuate the angled inner corners. These elements are bound into the tighter structure of the conjoined pavilions by stringcourse and cornice holding them like straps.

== See also ==
- Map of the Central station precinct
- Architecture of Sydney
- Rail transport in New South Wales
- All Saints Church, Canberra
