= Inner West Line =

Inner West Line may refer to one of the following public transport services or railway lines in Sydney, Australia:

- The L1 Inner West Light Rail
- The T2 T2 Leppington & Inner West Line
- The T3 T3 Liverpool & Inner West Line
- The Main Suburban railway line
