= Summer Hill railway station =

Railway station in Sydney, New South Wales, Australia

Summer Hill
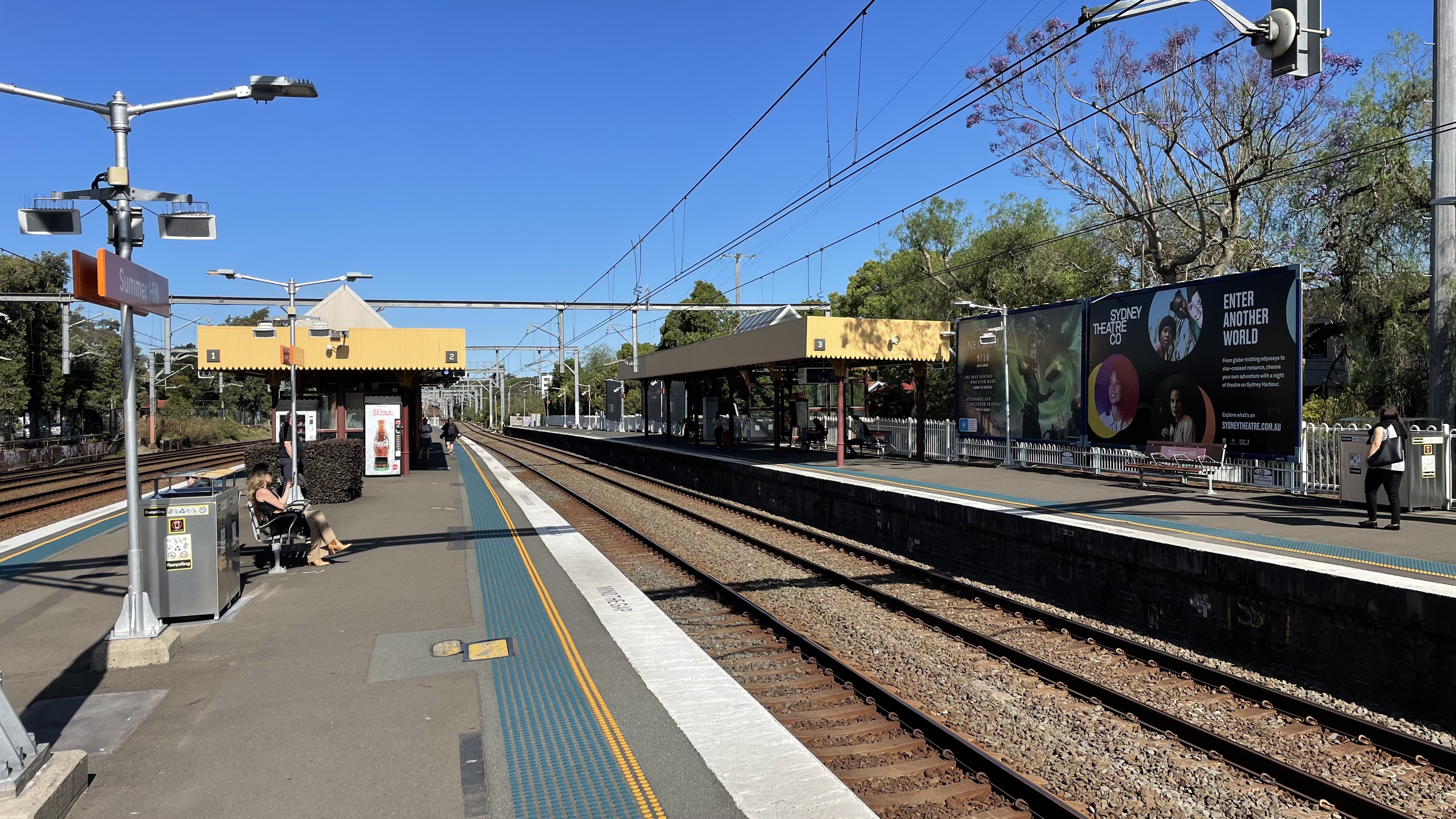
- Eastbound view from Platform 2 in October 2023

General information
- Location: Carlton Crescent, Summer Hill; Sydney, New South Wales; Australia
- Coordinates: 33°53′26″S 151°08′22″E
- Elevation: 26 metres (85 ft)
- Owner: Transport Asset Manager of NSW
- Operator: Sydney Trains
- Line: Main Suburban
- Distance: 7.03 km (4.37 mi) from Central
- Platforms: 3 (1 side, 1 island)
- Tracks: 6
- Connections: Bus

Construction
- Structure type: Ground
- Cycle facilities: Yes
- Accessible: Yes

Other information
- Status: Weekdays: Staffed: 6am to 7pm: Weekends and public holidays: Staffed: 8am to 4pm
- Station code: SMH
- Website: Transport for NSW

History
- Opened: 15 September 1879 (147 years ago)
- Electrified: Yes (from 1928)

Passengers
- 2025: 1,763,424 (year); 4,831 (daily) (Sydney Trains)
- Rank: 85

Services
Preceding station	Sydney Trains	Following station
Ashfield towards Parramatta or Leppington	Leppington & Inner West Line	Lewisham towards City Circle
Ashfield towards Liverpool	Liverpool & Inner West Line	Lewisham towards City Circle
North Shore & Western Line does not stop here
Northern Line does not stop here
Location

Summer Hill railway station is a suburban railway station located on the Main Suburban line, serving the Sydney suburb of Summer Hill. It is served by Sydney Trains T2 Leppington & Inner West Line and T3 Liverpool & Inner West Line services.

== History ==
Summer Hill station opened on 15 September 1879. The Main Suburban line through Summer Hill was quadruplicated in 1892, and sextuplicated in 1927 in association with electrification works.

As part of the 1892 work, the northern side platform was converted to an island platform and a new platform constructed on the most northern line. The latter was demolished as part of the 1927 works.

In 2004, Summer Hill was provided with lift facilities which are accessed from the subway. Initial plans called for a new overhead footbridge to access the station; however, this was opposed by locals on both aesthetic and access grounds, and the plans were subsequently altered to the current arrangement.

== Services ==
=== Platforms ===
Platform	Line	Stopping pattern	Notes
1		not in regular use	
2	Leppington & Inner West Line	services to Central & the City Circle	
2	Liverpool & Inner West Line	services to Central & the City Circle (weekday early morning, late night and weekends only)	
3	Leppington & Inner West Line	services to Homebush, Leppington & Parramatta	
3	Liverpool & Inner West Line	services to Liverpool via Regents Park (weekday early morning, late night and weekends only)	

=== Transport links ===
Summer Hill station is served by one NightRide route:

- N50: Liverpool to Town Hall station

== Gallery ==
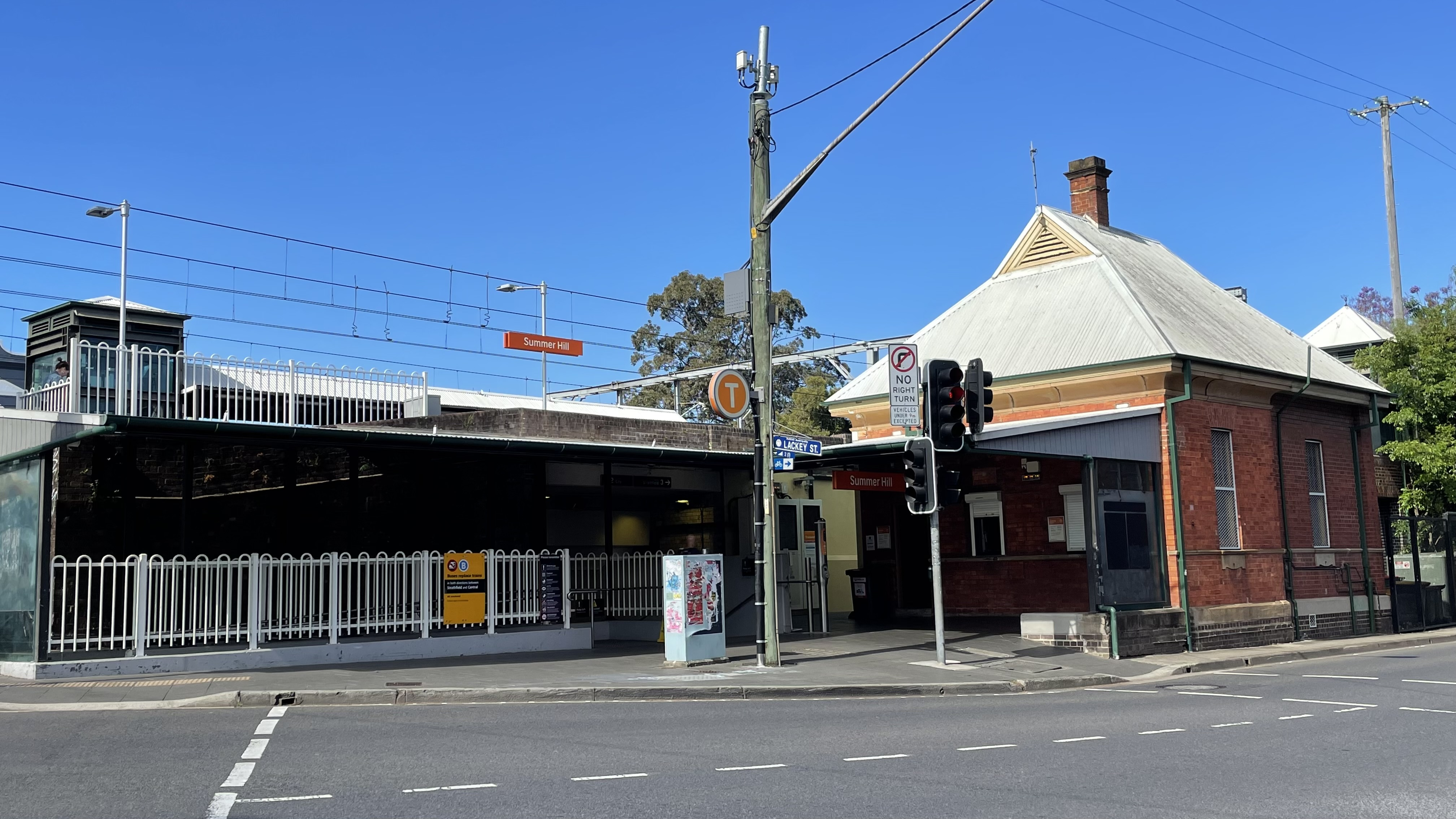
Carlton Cres Entrance in October 2023

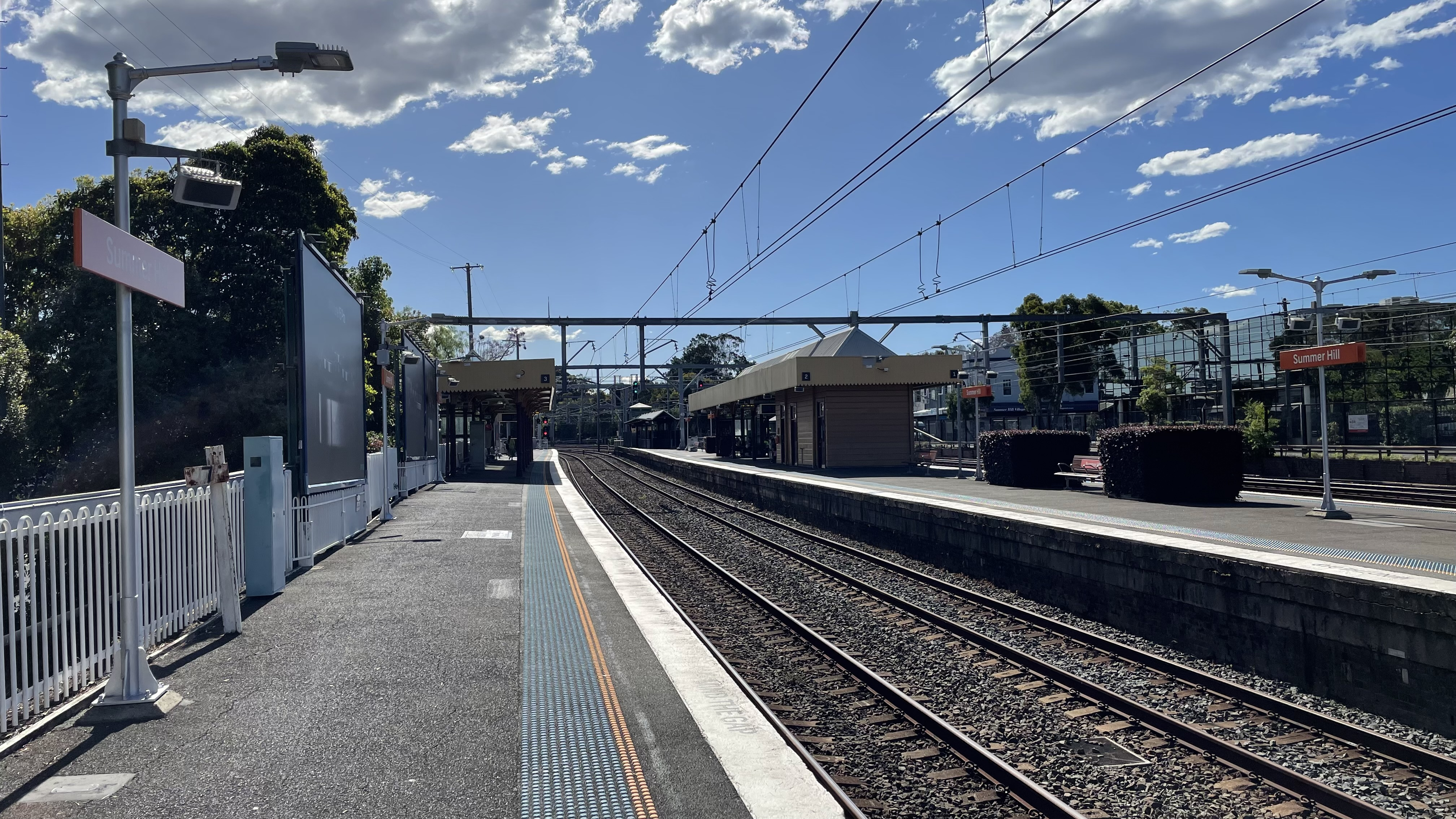
Westbound view of Platform 3 in October 2023

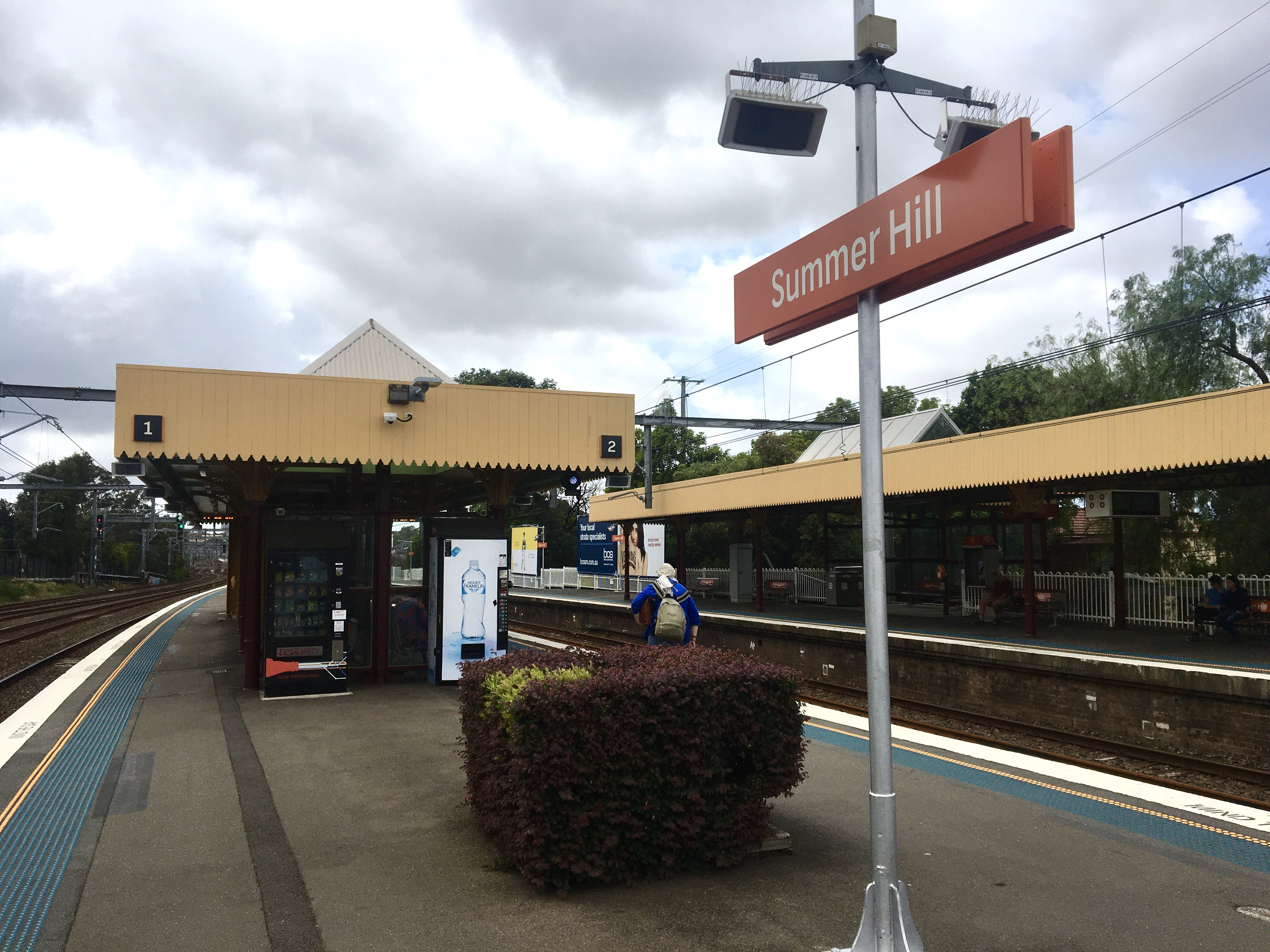
Eastbound view of station buildings in November 2019
