= Burwood railway station, Sydney =

Railway station in Sydney, New South Wales, Australia

Burwood
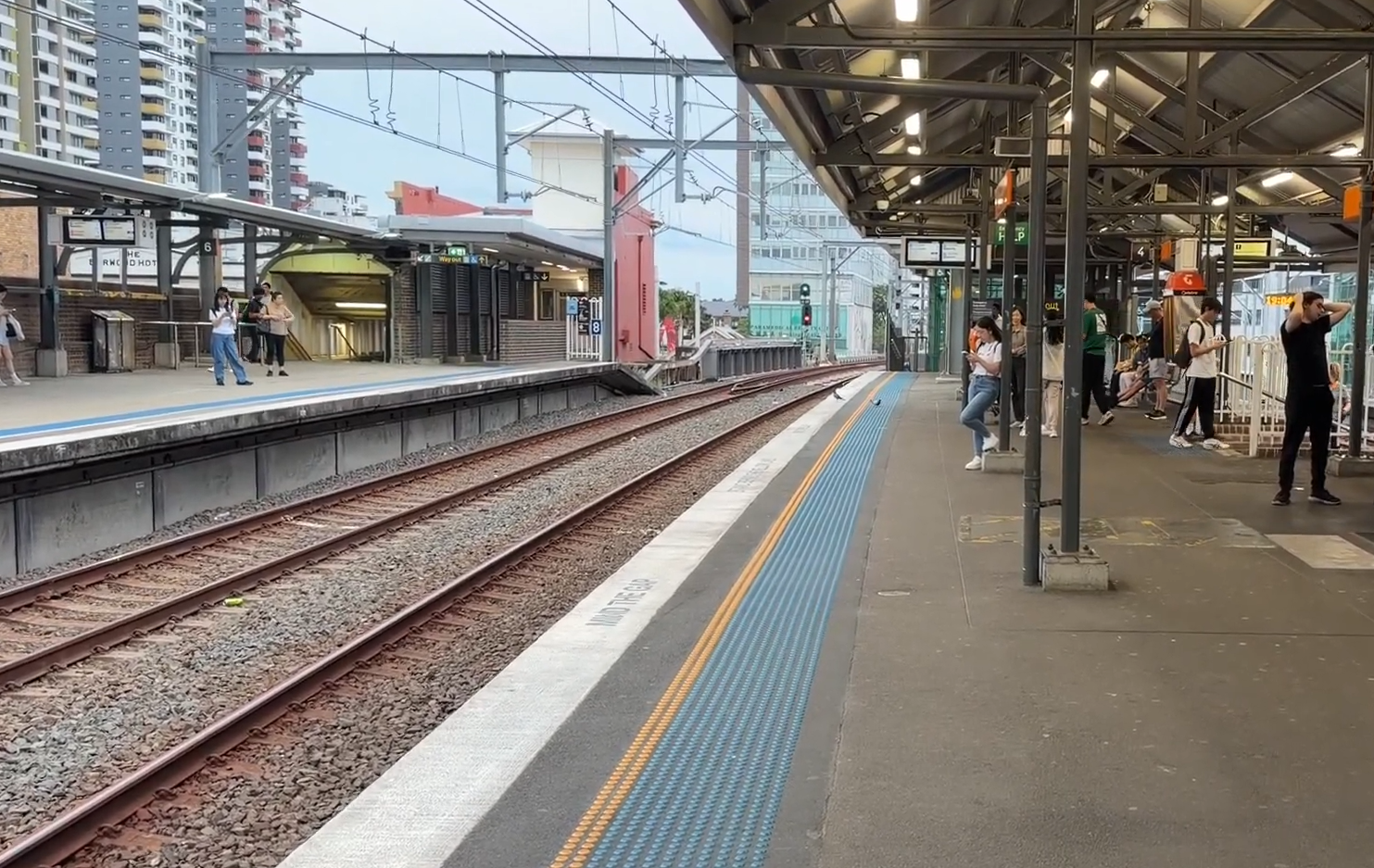
- Westbound view from Platform 5, February 2026

General information
- Location: Railway Parade, Burwood; Sydney, New South Wales; Australia
- Coordinates: 33°52′38″S 151°06′16″E
- Owner: Transport Asset Manager of NSW
- Operator: Sydney Trains
- Line: Main Suburban
- Distance: 10.62 km (6.60 mi) from Central
- Platforms: 6 (2 side, 2 island)
- Tracks: 6
- Connections: Bus

Construction
- Structure type: Elevated
- Accessible: Yes

Other information
- Status: Weekdays: Staffed: 24/7: Weekends and public holidays: Staffed: 24/7
- Station code: BWD
- Website: Transport for NSW

History
- Opened: 26 September 1855 (170 years ago)
- Rebuilt: 13 March 1892 (134 years ago)
- Electrified: Yes (from 1928)

Passengers
- 2025: 11,901,149 (year); 32,606 (daily) (Sydney Trains)
- Rank: 11

Services
Preceding station	Sydney Trains	Following station
Strathfield One-way operation	North Shore & Western Line (one weekday morning peak service)	Redfern towards Berowra
Strathfield towards Parramatta or Leppington	Leppington & Inner West Line Express	Ashfield towards City Circle
Strathfield towards Parramatta or Leppington	Leppington & Inner West Line	Croydon towards City Circle
Strathfield towards Liverpool	Liverpool & Inner West Line	Croydon towards City Circle
Strathfield towards Liverpool	Liverpool & Inner West Line Express (Weekdays only)	Ashfield towards City Circle
Strathfield towards Hornsby	Northern Line	Redfern towards Gordon

New South Wales Heritage Register
- Official name: Burwood Railway Station group
- Type: State heritage (complex / group)
- Designated: 2 April 1999
- Reference no.: 1106
- Type: Railway Platform / Station
- Category: Transport – Rail
Location

Burwood railway station is a heritage-listed suburban railway station located on the Main Suburban line in the Sydney suburb of Burwood. The station is served by Sydney Trains T9 Northern line, T2 Leppington & Inner West Line and T3 Liverpool & Inner West Line services.

== History ==
Sydney Railway Company opened the first railway line to Parramatta in 1855. The original Burwood station was a wooden platform near a level crossing over the grassy track that was Neich's Lane (later Burwood Road). This was beside the newly laid out township of Cheltenham. Access to public transport meant subdivision and consolidation followed, filling in the area between Parramatta Road and the Great Southern Road area which had previously been largely undeveloped woodlands. Burwood's population grew rapidly between 1874 and 1900, rising from 1200 to 7400 respectively, a rate of increase not matched since. This was part of a trend that saw Australia's population swell from three to five million between 1889 and 1918. This triggered urgent demand for housing, with Burwood station becoming part of an integrated public transport system of trams, ferries and trams, supporting the development of urban sprawl.

=== Railway Station Group ===
The original Burwood station opened on 26 September 1855 at a site at ground level on the west side of Burwood Road. The station was relocated in 1892 to the current location on the east side of Burwood Road and along Railway Parade when the line was quadruplicated. The line through Burwood was sextuplicated in 1922, and a second subway was constructed at the eastern end of the station. This subway closed after 1985.

In 1869, a post office was situated at the railway station. Postal services were previously conducted through general stores. In 1886, a new building was erected at the railway station (this remains today) and in 1892, the present day Post Office, designed by W. L. Vernon, was opened.

The surviving building at No. 1 Railway Parade dates from 1886 and was built by the Railway Department fronting the down platform of the then Burwood Station as a Post & Telegraph Office. It survived in its original form until c. 1894, when approximately 3/4 of the structure were removed from the southern side facing Railway Parade. It is the last remaining visible fabric of the second Burwood Railway Station which occupied the site immediately west of Burwood Road from 1878 to 1892. Its location coincides approximately with the site of an earlier station building which was erected in 1862 and demolished in 1878. The building is a rare surviving example of a purpose-built post office dating from the years when this facility was often closely associated with the spread and development of the state's railway network... Documentary evidence (historic measured surveys) show that the present building has a different footprint from that standing in 1890 and 1894. An examination of the fabric of the building provides clues to explaining that discrepancy. The present building was erected in 1886, not c.1880 or 1883 as claimed by others. It was purpose built by the Railway Department as a Post and Telegraph Office. Some time after 1894, the building was adapted for a new use as a Railway Goods Office; it may never have been used as a parcels office, even though it was so-named. The present building, and the associated crane and weighbridge, are considered to have local or possibly regional heritage significance.

The four surviving elements in the Burwood Goods Yard – pillar crane, weighbridge, office and platform – are physical reminders of a typical small suburban goods yard at the turn of the 20th century. Few traces of such elements survive at other yards, most if not all of which, such as Petersham and Ashfield, have been closed to goods traffic.

The surviving elements have the ability to be used in assisting in the interpretation of the many changes that have taken place to Burwood Railway Station since the opening of the first platform in 1855.

In April 1988, the goods siding to the south of the station was removed.

In 2009–10, the station underwent a significant refurbishment to address high levels of congestion at times of high patronage. Work included an expanded concourse with extra ticket barriers, new toilets and lifts to the platforms. The upgrade was completed in mid 2010.

== Services ==
=== Platforms ===
Platform	Line	Stopping pattern	Notes
1	T9	Peak hour services to Central (i, Platforms 1-12)	
2	T9	Peak hour services to Epping & Hornsby via Strathfield	
3	T9	services to Central & Gordon	
3	T1	one early morning weekday service to Berowra via Gordon	
4	T9	services to Epping & Hornsby via Strathfield	
5	T2	services to Central & the City Circle	
5	T3	services to Central & the City Circle	
6	T2	services to Homebush, Parramatta & Leppington	
6	T3	services to Liverpool via Regents Park	

=== Transport links ===
Transit Systems operates 16 bus routes via Burwood station, under contract to Transport for NSW:

- 407: to Strathfield station via Homebush West
- 408: to Rookwood
- 410: Hurstville to Marsfield via Campsie
- 415: Campsie to Chiswick
- 418: to Sydenham via Ashfield and Marrickville
- 420: Westfield Burwood to Mascot via Sydney Airport.
- 458: to Ryde
- 461X: to The Domain
- 461N: to Hyde Park Night service
- 464: Ashfield station to Mortlake
- 466: to Cabarita Park
- 490: Drummoyne to Hurstville
- 492: Drummoyne to Rockdale
- 526: to Olympic Park wharf and Rhodes
- 530: to Chatswood station via Drummoyne & Lane Cove
- M90: to Liverpool station via Bankstown station

Burwood station is served by three NightRide routes:

- N50: Liverpool station to Town Hall station
- N60: Fairfield station to Town Hall station
- N61: Carlingford station to Town Hall station

== Description ==
The complex comprises a brick in subway booking office, completed in 1892; and a brick parcels office that previously served as a railway post office, erected c. 1880.

Other structures include a brick pedestrian subway and steps; a 5-tonne (6-short-ton; 5-long-ton) jib crane; and a weighbridge, from Goulburn.

== Heritage listing ==
As at 24 November 2000, Burwood is a major suburban site with some significant structures dating from the 1880 period when the railway crossed Burwood Rd by a level crossing. The small former railway post office is a rare surviving example of this type of structure. The Parcels Office is also of significance because it shows the original earlier platform alignment on which the tracks were located and the changes with the upgrading of the line through that area in 1892.

Burwood railway station was listed on the New South Wales State Heritage Register on 2 April 1999 having satisfied the following criteria.

The place possesses uncommon, rare or endangered aspects of the cultural or natural history of New South Wales.

This item is assessed as historically rare. This item is assessed as scientifically rare. This item is assessed as arch. rare. This item is assessed as socially rare.

== Gallery ==
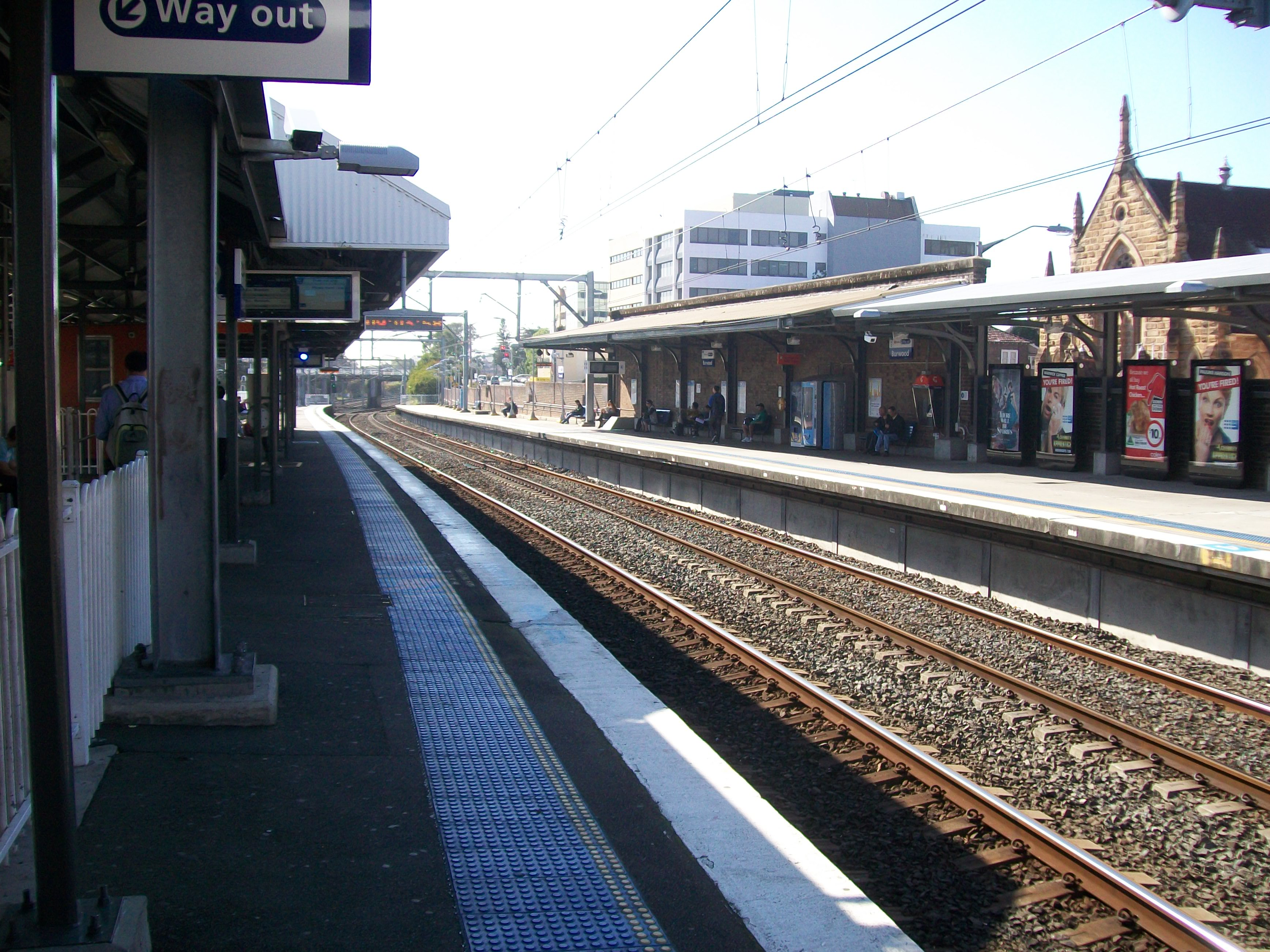
Eastbound view from Platforms 5 and 6 in October 2011

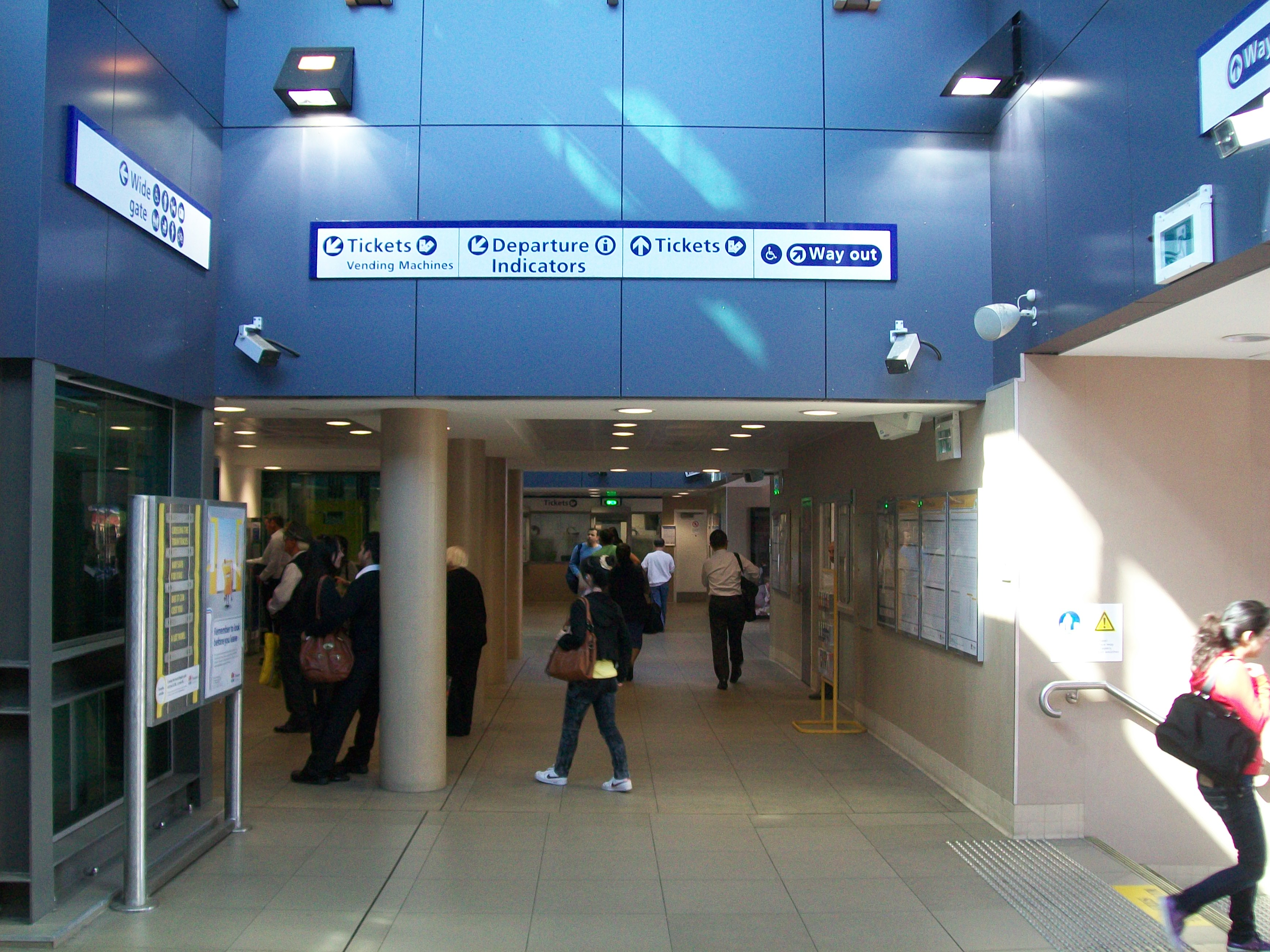
The station concourse in October 2011

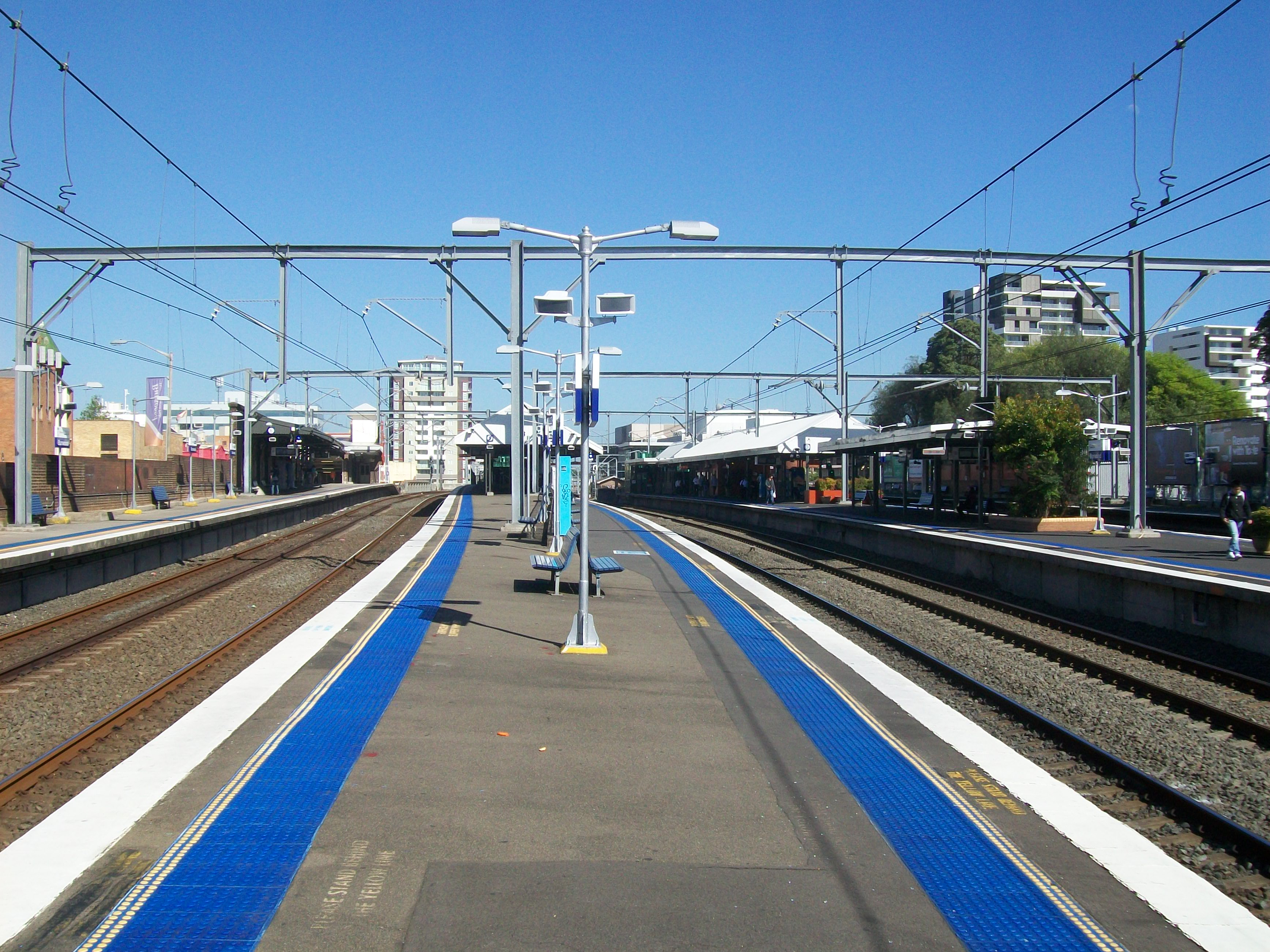
Westbound view from Platforms 4 and 5, October 2011

== See also ==
- List of Sydney Trains railway stations
