= Petersham railway station =

Railway station in Sydney, New South Wales, Australia

Petersham
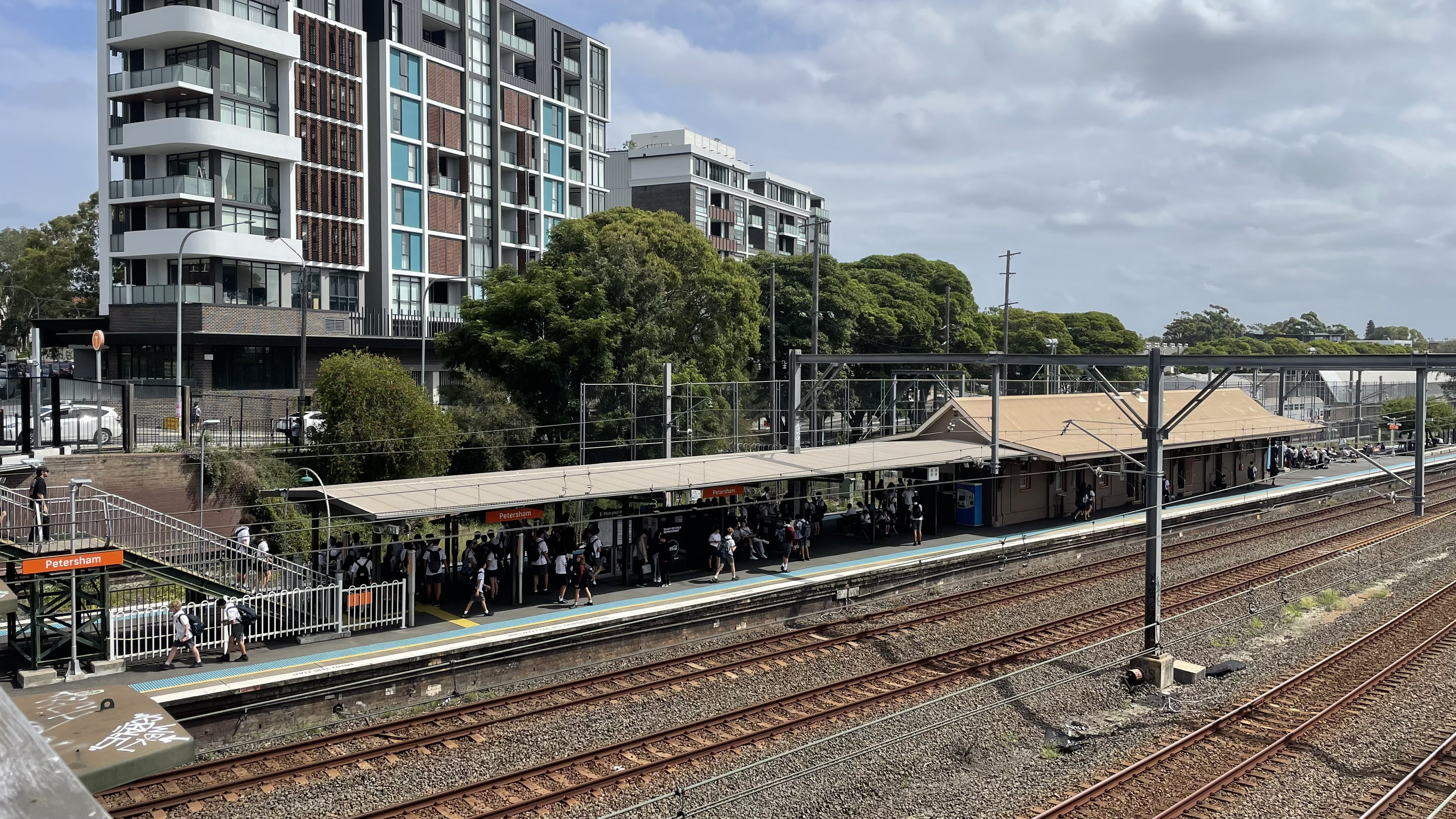
- Westbound view of Platform 1 in February 2023

General information
- Location: Trafalgar Street, Petersham; Sydney, New South Wales; Australia
- Coordinates: 33°53′38″S 151°09′19″E
- Elevation: 34 metres (112 ft)
- Owner: Transport Asset Manager of NSW
- Operator: Sydney Trains
- Line: Main Suburban
- Distance: 5.50 km (3.42 mi) from Central
- Platforms: 2 (1 island)
- Tracks: 6
- Connections: Bus

Construction
- Structure type: Ground
- Accessible: Yes

Other information
- Status: Weekdays: Staffed: 6am to 7pm: Weekends and public holidays: Staffed: 8am to 4pm
- Station code: PSM
- Website: Transport for NSW

History
- Opened: 6 January 1857 (169 years ago)
- Electrified: Yes (from 1928)

Passengers
- 2025: 1,788,246 (year); 4,899 (daily) (Sydney Trains)
- Rank: 84

Services
Preceding station	Sydney Trains	Following station
Lewisham towards Parramatta or Leppington	T2 Leppington & Inner West Line	Stanmore towards City Circle
Lewisham towards Liverpool	T3 Liverpool & Inner West Line	Stanmore towards City Circle
T1 North Shore & Western Line does not stop here
T9 Northern Line does not stop here

New South Wales Heritage Register
- Official name: Petersham Railway Station group
- Type: State heritage (built)
- Designated: 2 April 1999
- Reference no.: 1223
- Type: Railway Platform / Station
- Category: Transport – Rail
- Builders: Department of Railways
Location

Petersham railway station is a heritage-listed suburban railway station located on the Main Suburban line, serving the Sydney suburb of Petersham. It is served by Sydney Trains T2 Leppington & Inner West Line and T3 Liverpool & Inner West Line services. It was added to the New South Wales State Heritage Register on 2 April 1999.

== History ==
Petersham station was opened on 6 January 1857 as a halt. A goods yard was established in 1882 and soon afterwards plans were prepared to quadruplicate the main line from Sydney to Homebush. This resulted in a further reorganisation of the Petersham yard so that the main station building was sited "up" on the platform and a new iron footbridge was built to cross the new railway and connect up with a new island platform where the earlier building was demolished and replaced by an elegantly designed curved roof structure.

Petersham station in 1900, with the original building and platforms in use.

The new station building and footbridge were all designed by George Cowdery who was also responsible for the design of several other large and elaborate station buildings, including Newcastle (1876), Werris Creek (1883) and Cootamundra (1887). The plan of the station was based on the standard developed by John Whitton but the design and detailing of the station buildings and footbridge were much more elaborate than most station designs used elsewhere.

In 1891, the present subway was built and another island platform building constructed to serve the slow tracks. Access to the platforms from this subway closed after 1988.

A turn-back siding previously located between the local tracks has now been removed. This turn back siding was located on land now used for the training college west of the station.

The Main Suburban line through Petersham was quadruplicated in 1892. A pedestrian subway was provided in 1892 at the western end of the station, connecting Trafalgar and Terminus Streets. Access to the platforms from this subway closed after 1988.

Additional land was purchased in 1911 for a large goods yard and, with a new goods shed built in 1913, made Petersham a major suburban station serving passengers and freight.

In 1926, the addition of a further two tracks and electrification as part of a second stage of sextuplication and electrification of the Main Suburban line resulted in a major change to the way the station operated. The 1885 station building was closed and eventually became the offices of the District Signal Engineer. The other platform buildings were demolished and replaced by a brick building. The goods yard was gradually phased out and closed shortly after the second world war.

In 1954 the north wing of the 1885 building was taken over by the Railways and Tramways Hospital Fund, and the present eastern wing was added.

Upgrades to the station took place in the late 1990s, with the wooden steps on the footbridge being replaced due to their slipperiness in wet weather, a small but high-roofed shed at the east end of the platform being removed for security reasons, and the area under the lower part of the platform stairs also being fenced-off for similar concerns.

In 2021, the station received a significant upgrade, adding lifts and ramps to provide ambulant access to the platform, new bicycle parking, and improved amenities.

=== Training college ===
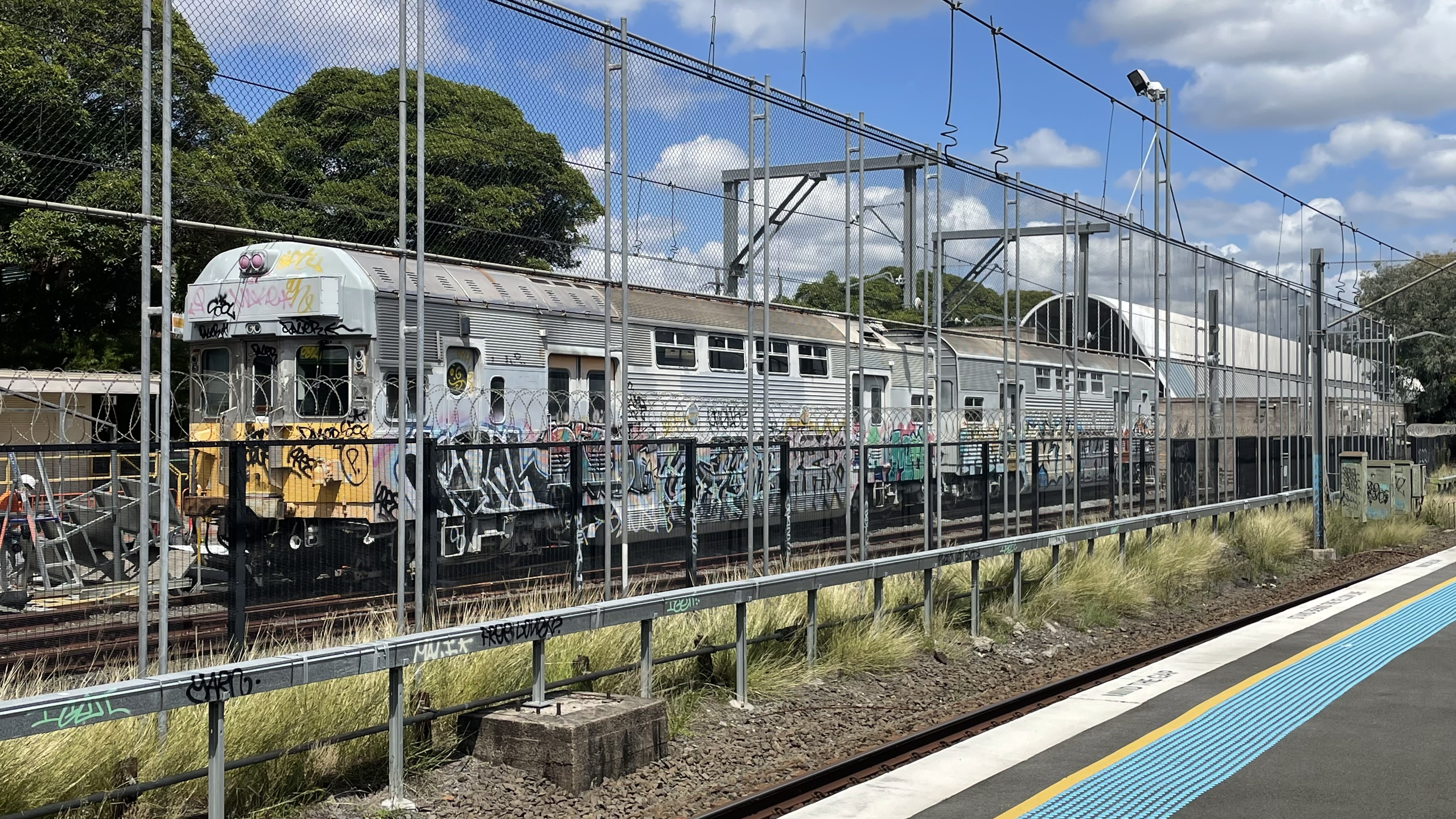
S Set at the training college

In 1967, the Department of Railways granted the New South Wales Rail Transport Museum use of the former goods sidings pending its moving to Enfield. On 6 November 1987, this site was opened by the State Rail Authority as a training college, being officially opened by Minister for Transport Ron Mulock. It was refurbished in 2008 with the two Tulloch trailers replaced with S set carriages As well as various pieces of rail signalling and track infrastructure, the training college has two S set carriages.

== Services ==
=== Platforms ===
Platform	Line	Stopping pattern	Notes
1	T2 Leppington & Inner West Line	services to Central & the City Circle	
1	T3 Liverpool & Inner West Line	services to Central & the City Circle (weekday early morning, late night and weekends only)	
2	T2 Leppington & Inner West Line	services to Homebush, Leppington & Parramatta	
2	T3 Liverpool & Inner West Line	services to Liverpool via Regents Park (weekday early morning, late night and weekends only)	

=== Transport links ===
Transit Systems operates two bus routes via Petersham station, under contract to Transport for NSW:

- 412: Martin Place to Campsie station via Earlwood
- 445: Balmain to Campsie station via Canterbury

Petersham station is served by one NightRide route:

- N50: Liverpool station to Town Hall station

== Description ==
The Petersham station complex consists of the current station building on Platform 1/2 (1926), the former station building on Terminus Street (1885 with 1954 alterations), platforms alongside each station building (1885 and 1926), a footbridge (1883), a pedestrian subway (1891), a signal box (1927), and a modern canopy.

Petersham Railway Station is entered from Trafalgar Street to the south and Terminus Street to the north. The station group has a former wayside platform and station building (currently offices) and island platform accessed via the footbridge. The former station building is generally accessed from Terminus Street. To the north of the station on Terminus Street is a residential area while to the south and across Trafalgar Street by industrial and commercial buildings.

Former station building (1885 with 1954 alterations)

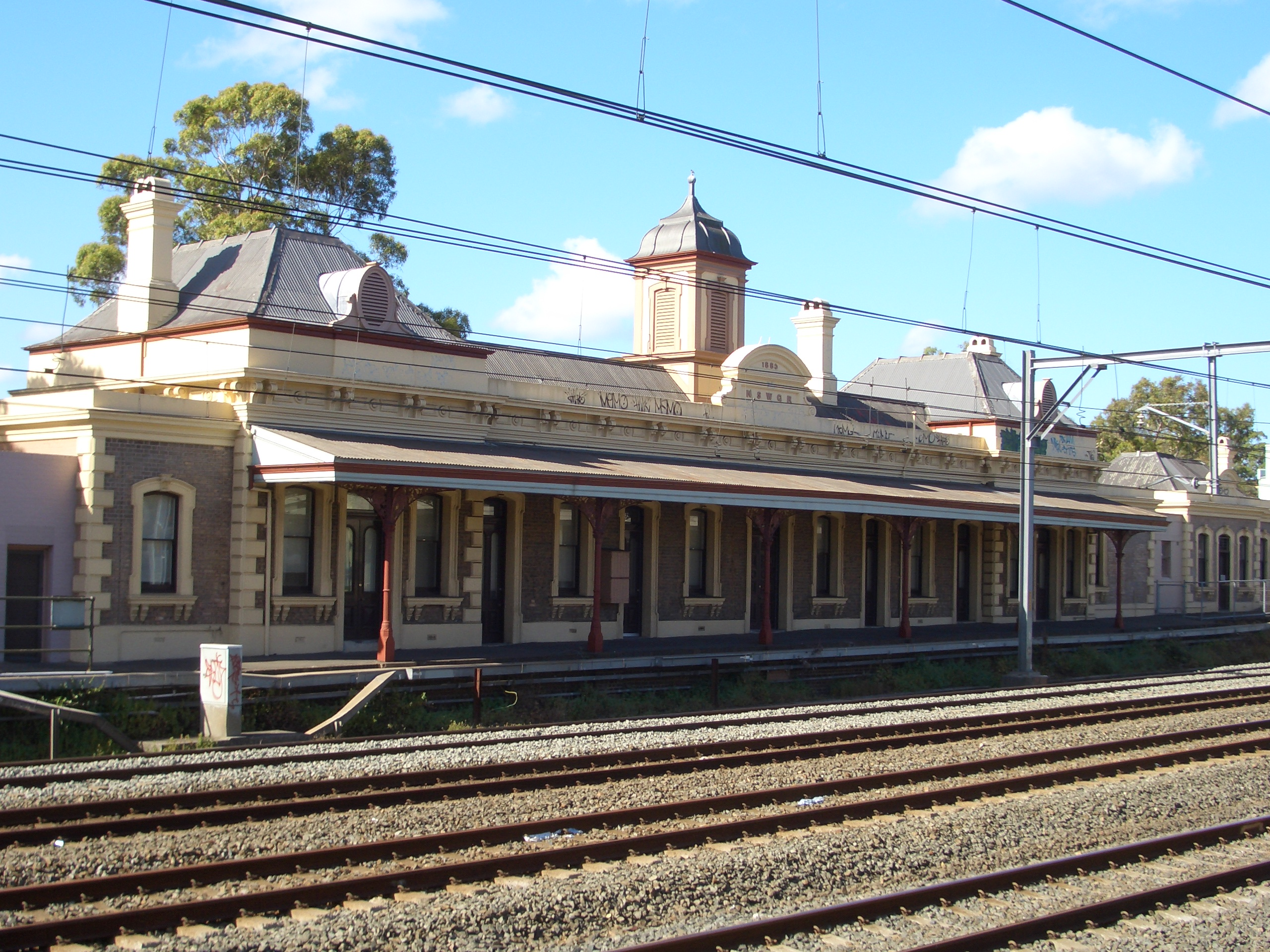
Former Petersham station building

The "first class station building" is a symmetrical composition in an ornate Italianate style with a high parapeted central block, a central tower, and flanked by lower supporting buildings. The main block is fronted to the south by a platform awning supported by cast iron columns with decorative cast iron lace work. The width of this platform has been reduced since it was decommissioned. The Terminus Street elevation is accessed via sandstone steps onto a veranda, supported on cast iron columns with decorative lacework, which spans the extent of the central block. An access door under this veranda has been created off the lower landing of the stone steps to the west. The exterior walls are face brickwork with painted moulded cement decorative elements. To the eastern end of the original building is a rendered brick extension. Infill sections have been constructed between the previously separate wings to the east and west and 2 garage doors under the eastern wing (there was previously a garage door located further to the east which has subsequently been bricked up).

Recent restorations have included new tuck pointing and the reinstatement of most of the doors and windows to the south elevation, although several remain non-operational. The works also saw the roof replaced in corrugated steel sheeting in place of the original slate. The oval vents to the roof were reinstated. These works have been undertaken in an appropriate and sensitive manner obviously with reference to the original architectural drawings.

There have been several changes to the existing building internally, mostly as a result of changing function. There are several new openings in the partition walls, and these have been treated so as to complement the original style of the building. The doors and windows to the north elevation are for the most part, original, with the reproduced doors and windows to the south elevation to match. All mouldings such as skirtings, architrave and cornices are in keeping with the age of the building.

From the garage and subfloor space it would appear that much of the timber floor structure has been replaced. These floors are carpeted above. Many of the later partition walls and fittings have been worked around the existing fabric and would for the most part be considered "reversible". There is Perspex secondary glazing to the openings on the south side in an attempt to keep out the noise of the passing trains.

The former station building was in good condition at the time of heritage listing.

The exterior of this building is largely intact and has been subject to extensive restoration in recent years. The offices which occupy the 1954 extension and a small section of the original 1885 building are not considered significant. While this extension to the west has little merit, it does not detract from the integrity of the main building. Likewise, infill sections are poorly executed but do not have a major impact on the integrity of the 1885 building. The interior contains many architectural features, both original and reproductions, which contribute to the significance and integrity of the building as a whole.

Platform Building (1926)

A rectangular face brick building (all painted) with a gabled roof and integral shallower sloped cantilevered awnings. The face brick in stretcher bond has been painted. The building is seven bays in length, with the bays defined by engaged brick piers which coincide with the awning supports. Original chimneys have been removed. The cantilever awning is on standard double bowed steel brackets supported on decorative cement cornices on engaged brick piers and bolt fixings to the station building brick walls. The soffit is the underside of the corrugated steel roof fixed to intermediate exposed purlins. There is a decorative timber fascia at the junction with the brick wall. Vertical timber boards form a valance at each end. The edge of the awning is finished with a plain timber fascia. The awning roof, as for the main roof, is corrugated steel. The window openings have brick sills and arched brick heads with original timber sashes. Security grilles have been fitted to all doors and windows and modern services fixed to the building. The canopy to the eastern end is completely modern (c. 1990s). The planter box to the western end is thought to be where the stairs once accessed the subway.

The interior is much altered from original plans dated 1925. The booking office and associated functions were relocated to be housed in this building when the subway was closed. Some original features remain including the mini corrugated metal ceilings and pressed metal ceiling roses, moulded bead detail to rendered and set walls, cornices and architraves. Windows are original sashes however the doors are replacements. The floor is covered in vinyl and may have original timber floorboards under. The existing waiting room, which is currently used as a store has the original bench seating. The toilets have been relocated from the original plans to the western end of the building and these rooms now have little merit.

The platform building was in good condition at the time of heritage listing.

While the exterior is mainly intact, the interior has been modified to meet ever-changing operational requirements. This, coupled with the fact that there a more intact examples of this type of platform building elsewhere, has reduced the integrity of this particular building.

Signal box (1927)

External: A timber-framed structure with fibre cement cladding on brick base. Access is on the eastern side, via precast concrete stairs, onto cantilevered concrete platform. The small external toilet is accessed off the concrete platform to the south. To the north-east and north-west corners there are timber framed multi paned sliding casement windows with security grilles to the exterior. The building features a Dutch gable roof with fibre cement slates and decorative finials with a timber louvred vent to the gablets.

Internally, it has typical ceiling detail with a raked section to perimeter and cover mouldings. The metal bracing across the ceiling is also typical in signal boxes of this period. The interior walls have fibre cement sheet and batten cladding. The original signalling equipment still remains.

The signal box is mostly intact with all its signalling equipment, original fibre cement slate tiles and weatherboard walls. It was reported to require maintenance attention at the time of heritage listing.

Platforms

Platform 1 (Up) and Platform 2 (Down) form an island platform with asphalt surface and original brick facing. The platform to the former station (to the north) has been made narrower and is not currently used.

Canopies

There is a modern canopy at the edge of the stairs that leads down from the footbridge onto the platform and it provides shelter to the space between the stairs and the platform building. The canopy has a slight butterfly roof and is constructed of Colorbond steel sheets resting on steel I beams and columns.

Footbridge (1883)

The footbridge comprises a deck connecting both Trafalgar and Terminus Streets and stairs that lead down to the platform and the streets. The entire structure rests on original brick piers, cast iron columns, arches and steel trestles. Refurbished in 1992 the footbridge has a concrete deck and stairs with painted steel handrails and balustrades. The riveted metal lattice work to the underneath of the deck of the footbridge is original.

Pedestrian Subway (1891)

The subway runs from north to south under the rail tracks and accommodates the two entries into the station. It has brick walls and a ceiling made of original concrete slabs reinforced with steel joists. However, as the walls are almost entirely covered in graffiti it is difficult to ascertain original fabric. The subway originally had a booking office and stairs leading up to the platforms. However at some point both were bricked in and this has resulted in the subway having no connections with the platforms and serving as only a crossing under the tracks.

Retaining walls

There are brick retaining walls along Terminus Street made of English bond brickwork from the platform to former station building with an opening for stairs to footbridge. The wall continues up Terminus Street to the east for approximately 100 metres.

Moveable items of heritage significance

- Safe in Station Manager's Office
- Honours Board in Station Manager's Office
- Photographs in Station Manager's Office & Terminus Street Building
- NSWGR Sink in garage of Terminus Street Building

Integrity

Despite the moderate integrity of the island platform buildings and the limited integrity of the subway, overall the Petersham Station Group is assessed as having a high level of integrity based on the condition and intactness of the Terminus Street former station building, the footbridge and the signal box.

== Heritage listing ==
Petersham Railway Station has State significance as the station with its group of largely intact, original structures dating from the 1880s establishment of the station through to the 1891 quadruplication and the 1927 sextuplication of the line, is able to demonstrate the growth and expansion of the railways in the late 19th and early 20th century. The building serves to mark the alignment of the first railway in NSW, that being the 1855 Sydney to Parramatta line;

The 1880s former station building is the largest and most elaborate 19th century station building constructed for the Sydney suburban rail system and is the only major "First Class" station building known to have been built in Sydney in the 19th century and is therefore unique in the history of the New South Wales Government Railways. It is a fine example of a late Victorian Italianate station dating from 1885, and although compromised by later alterations and additions is substantially intact and capable of restoration. The building is unusual and of significance by being reached from the street by a grand stair in the classical manner and having a landscaped forecourt to a suburban street and forms a major part of an important historic railway precinct including the bridge and signal box and is a significant landmark in this part of Petersham, which retains much of its 19th century built street character. The station is one of a select number of similar buildings designed by the office of the Engineer for the Existing Lines Branch, George Cowdery, with the 1883 iron pedestrian bridge and steps also designed by Cowdery;

Petersham railway station was listed on the New South Wales State Heritage Register on 2 April 1999 having satisfied the following criteria.

The place is important in demonstrating the course, or pattern, of cultural or natural history in New South Wales.

Petersham Railway Station has State significance as the station with its group of largely intact, original structures dating from the 1880s establishment of the station through to the 1891 quadruplication and the 1927 sextuplication of the line, is able to demonstrate the growth and expansion of the railways in the late 19th and early 20th century. The extant 19th and 20th century platforms, buildings, footbridge, subway and signal box are collectively able to demonstrate important historical phases of suburban railway development.

The place has a strong or special association with a person, or group of persons, of importance of cultural or natural history of New South Wales's history.

Petersham Railway Station is significant for its association with Engineer-in-Chief George Cowdery under whose direction the extant 1880s former station building and footbridge were designed, the design and detailing of the station building and footbridge being more elaborate than most station design used elsewhere.

The place is important in demonstrating aesthetic characteristics and/or a high degree of creative or technical achievement in New South Wales.

Petersham Railway Station has State aesthetic significance with its 1880s "first class station building" which displays complicated roof forms, large symmetrical plan and awnings supported on cast iron columns. The building has a prominent presence to both Terminus Street and as viewed from the island platform and footbridge. The 1920s "initial island" platform building is significant with its design showing linear form, gable roof and integrated awnings. The 1880s footbridge with stairs leading down the platforms and streets has been altered considerably in terms of the recasting of the stairs and deck and installation of new handrails and balustrades. However the footbridge has a number of 1880s elements namely brick piers, cast iron columns, arches, steel trestles and latticework to the deck and overall retains is aesthetic quality.

The signal box which dates from 1927 has technical significance as it contains all its signalling equipment demonstrating signalling technology of this era.

The place has strong or special association with a particular community or cultural group in New South Wales for social, cultural or spiritual reasons.

The place has the potential to contribute to the local community's sense of place and can provide a connection to the local community's history.

The place possesses uncommon, rare or endangered aspects of the cultural or natural history of New South Wales.

Petersham Railway Station has rarity in terms of its "first class station building" and the footbridge, with the station building being the only 'first class station building' in the Sydney area and the footbridge being the second oldest surviving footbridge in NSW and a unique example within the suburban network.

The place is important in demonstrating the principal characteristics of a class of cultural or natural places/environments in New South Wales.

The building on platform 1/2 has been altered internally but it retains a high level of integrity to its exterior and is representative of a common form of standard platform building design. With seven bays the building is one of the larger examples of its type and is therefore an excellent representation of this type. The signal box at Petersham Railway Station has characteristic features of this type of signal box namely its elevated brickwork base, timber framed, fibre cement clad operating level structure and Dutch gable roof and has a high level of integrity as its original signalling equipment has been retained and it still has original fibre cement slate roof tiles, making it an excellent example.

== Gallery ==
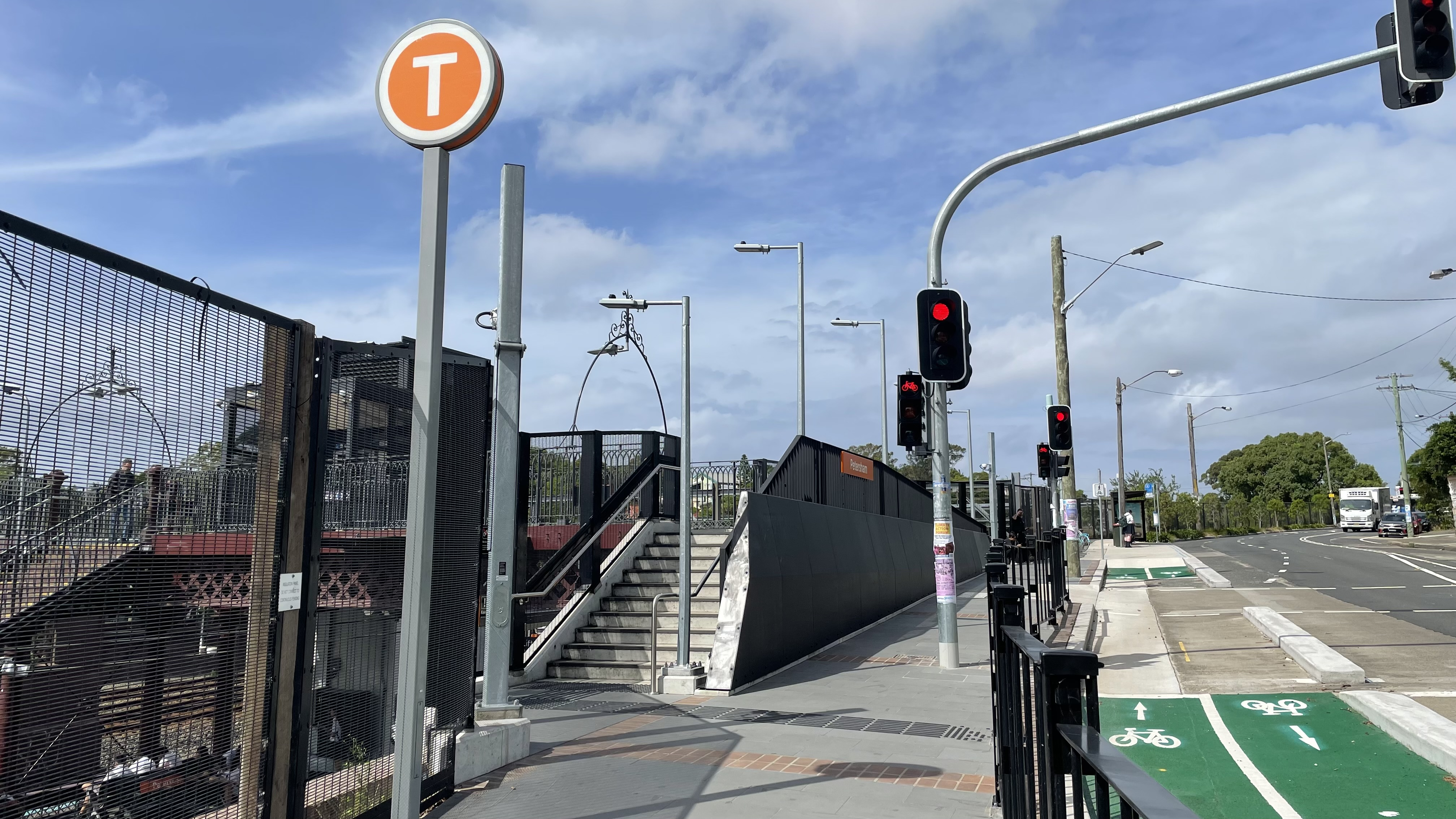
Trafalgar Street entrance

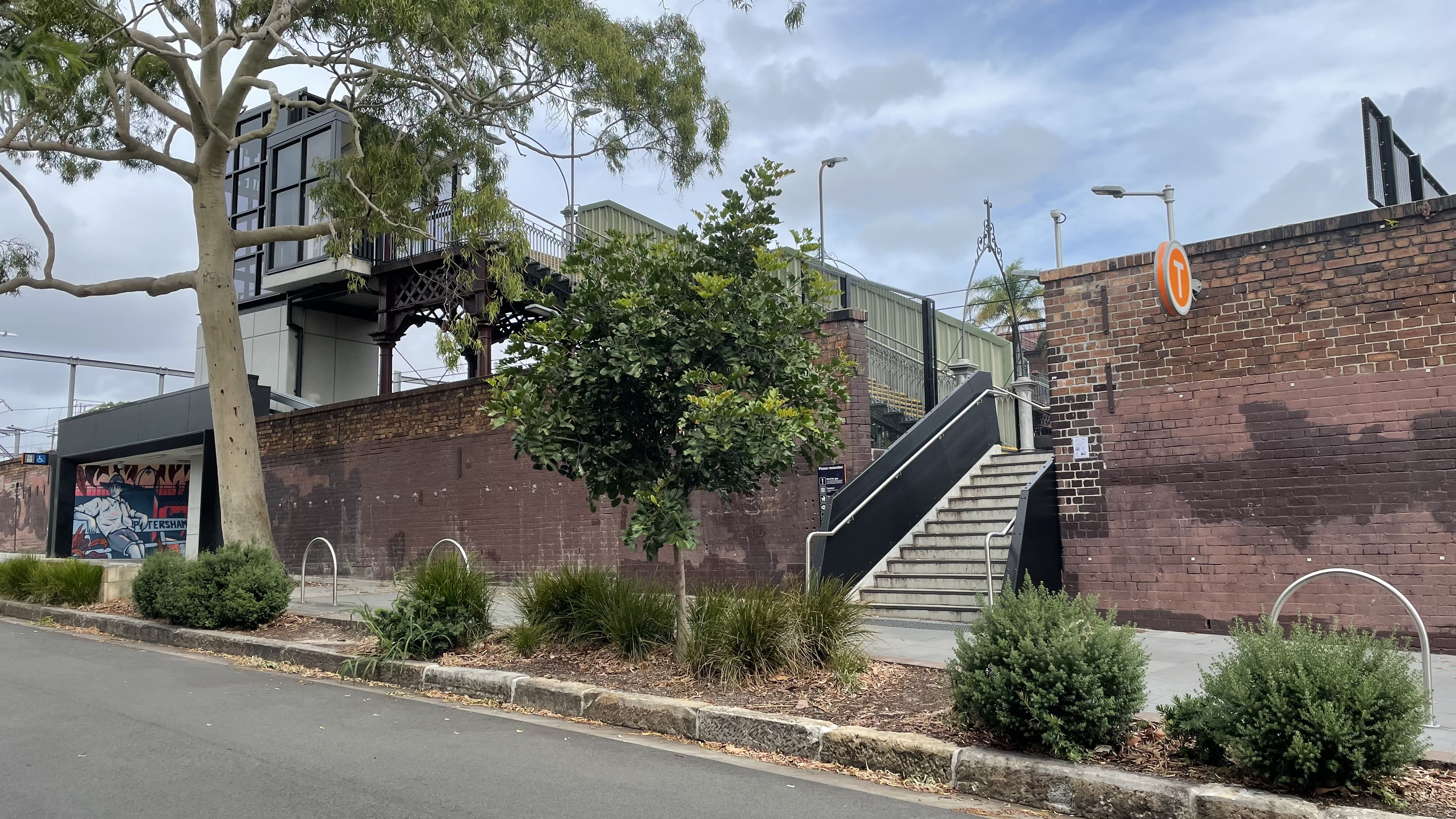
Terminus Street entrance
