= Lewisham railway station, Sydney =

Railway station in Sydney, New South Wales, Australia

Lewisham
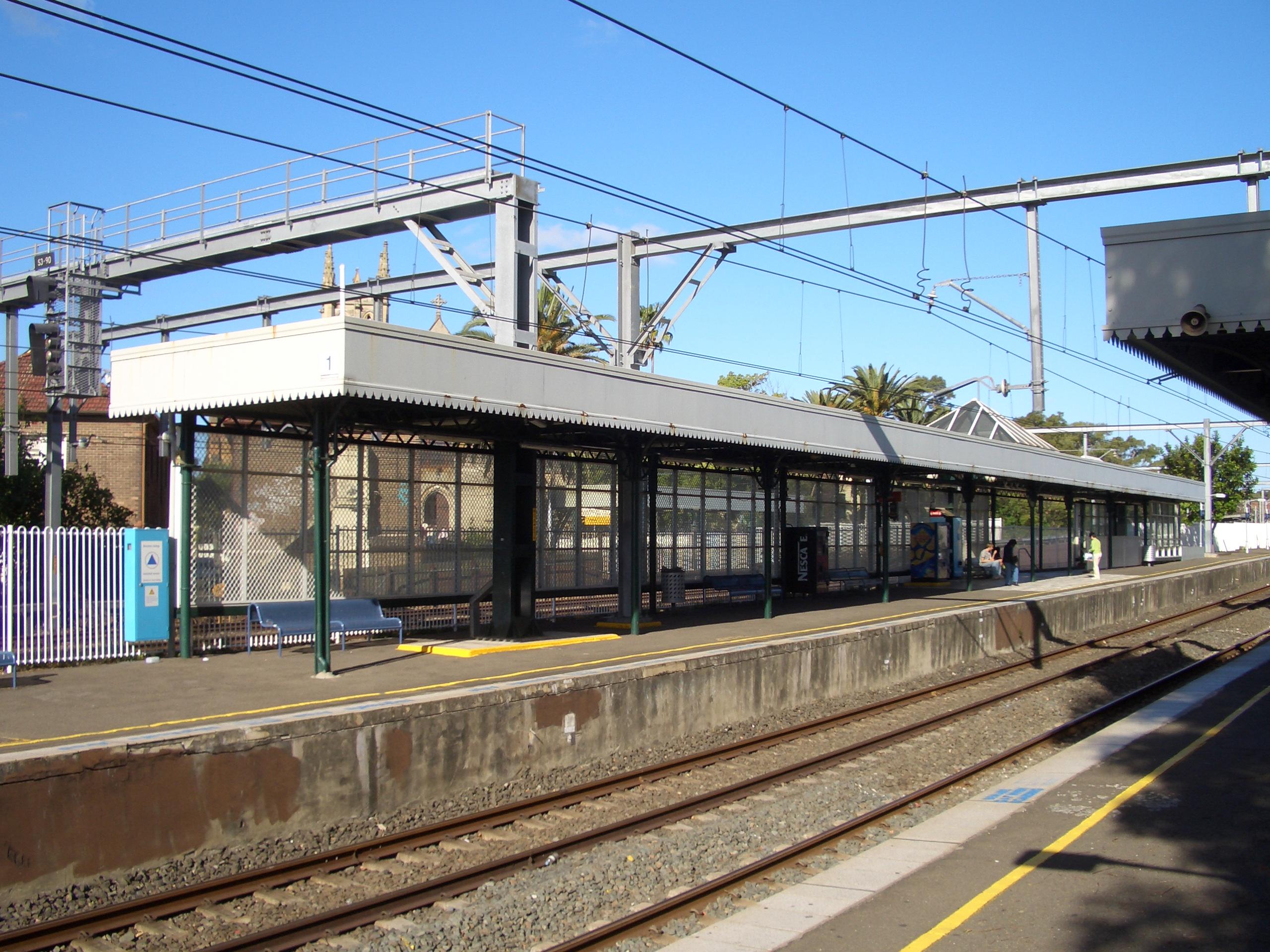
- Station shelter on Platform 2 in October 2006

General information
- Location: Railway Terrace, Lewisham; Sydney, New South Wales; Australia
- Coordinates: 33°53′36″S 151°08′51″E
- Elevation: 24 metres (79 ft)
- Owner: Transport Asset Manager of NSW
- Operator: Sydney Trains
- Line: Main Suburban
- Distance: 6.25 km (3.88 mi) from Central
- Platforms: 2 (2 side)
- Tracks: 6
- Connections: Bus; Lewisham West

Construction
- Structure type: Ground
- Accessible: No

Other information
- Status: Weekdays: Staffed: 6am to 7pm: Weekends and public holidays: Unstaffed
- Station code: LWI
- Website: Transport for NSW

History
- Opened: 1886 (140 years ago)
- Rebuilt: 19 December 1891 (134 years ago)
- Electrified: Yes (from 1928)

Passengers
- 2025: 1,350,261 (year); 3,699 (daily) (Sydney Trains)
- Rank: 106

Services
Preceding station	Sydney Trains	Following station
Summer Hill towards Parramatta or Leppington	Leppington & Inner West Line	Petersham towards City Circle
Summer Hill towards Liverpool	Liverpool & Inner West Line	Petersham towards City Circle
North Shore & Western Line does not stop here
Northern Line does not stop here
Location

Lewisham railway station is a suburban railway station located on the Main Suburban line, serving the Sydney suburb of Lewisham. It is served by Sydney Trains T2 Leppington & Inner West Line and T3 Liverpool & Inner West Line services.

== History ==
Lewisham station opened in 1886. The Main Suburban line through Lewisham was quadruplicated in 1892, and sextuplicated in 1927 in association with electrification works.

As part of the 1892 work, the northern side platform was converted to an island platform and a new platform constructed on the most northern line. The former was trimmed back to a single platform, and the latter demolished as part of the 1927 works. In September 1990, Lewisham closed for three months as the first station that CityRail upgraded.

An easy access upgrade to the station will commence in 2024.

== Services ==
=== Platforms ===
Platform	Line	Stopping pattern	Notes
1	T2	services to Central & the City Circle	
1	T3	services to Central & the City Circle (weekday early morning, late night and weekends only)	
2	T2	services to Homebush, Leppington & Parramatta	
2	T3	services to Liverpool via Regents Park (weekday early morning, late night and weekends only)	

=== Transport links ===
Transit Systems operates one bus route via Lewisham station, under contract to Transport for NSW:

- 413: Railway Square to Campsie station

Lewisham station is served by one NightRide route:

- N50: Liverpool station to Town Hall station

Lewisham West light rail station on the Inner West Light Rail is located 300 metres south-west of Lewisham station, and is served by L1 Dulwich Hill Line services.
