= Ashfield railway station, Sydney =

Railway station in Sydney, New South Wales, Australia

Ashfield
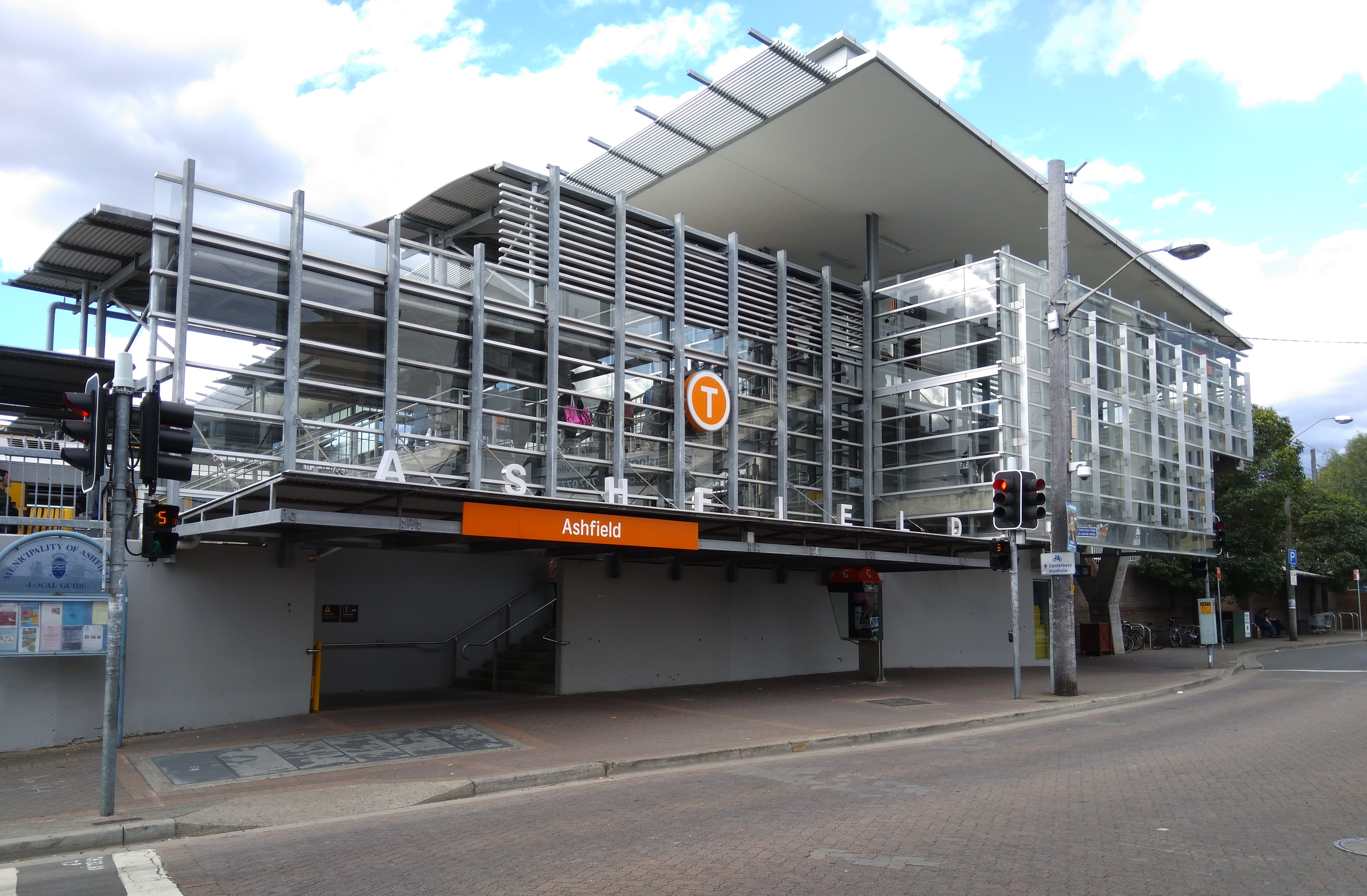
- The station's southern entrance, building and concourse in August 2017

General information
- Location: Brown Street, Ashfield; Sydney, New South Wales; Australia
- Coordinates: 33°53′15″S 151°07′32″E
- Elevation: 31 metres (102 ft)
- Owner: Transport Asset Manager of NSW
- Operator: Sydney Trains
- Line: Main Suburban
- Distance: 8.38 km (5.21 mi) from Central
- Platforms: 5 (1 side, 2 island)
- Tracks: 7
- Connections: Bus

Construction
- Structure type: Ground
- Accessible: Yes

Other information
- Status: Weekdays: Staffed: 24/7: Weekends and public holidays: Staffed: 24/7
- Station code: AFD
- Website: Transport for NSW

History
- Opened: 26 September 1855 (170 years ago)
- Rebuilt: 2002 (24 years ago)
- Electrified: Yes (from 1928)

Passengers
- 2025: 6,055,370 (year); 16,590 (daily) (Sydney Trains)
- Rank: 25

Services
Preceding station	Sydney Trains	Following station
Croydon towards Parramatta or Leppington	Leppington & Inner West Line	Summer Hill towards City Circle
Burwood towards Leppington	Leppington & Inner West Line Express	Newtown towards City Circle
Croydon towards Liverpool	Liverpool & Inner West Line	Summer Hill towards City Circle
Burwood towards Liverpool	Liverpool & Inner West Line Express (Weekdays only)	Newtown towards City Circle
North Shore & Western Line does not stop here
Northern Line does not stop here
Location
- Location within New South Wales Location within Australia

Ashfield railway station is a suburban railway station located on the Main Suburban line, serving the Sydney suburb of Ashfield. It is served by Sydney Trains T2 Leppington & Inner West Line and T3 Liverpool & Inner West Line services.

== History ==
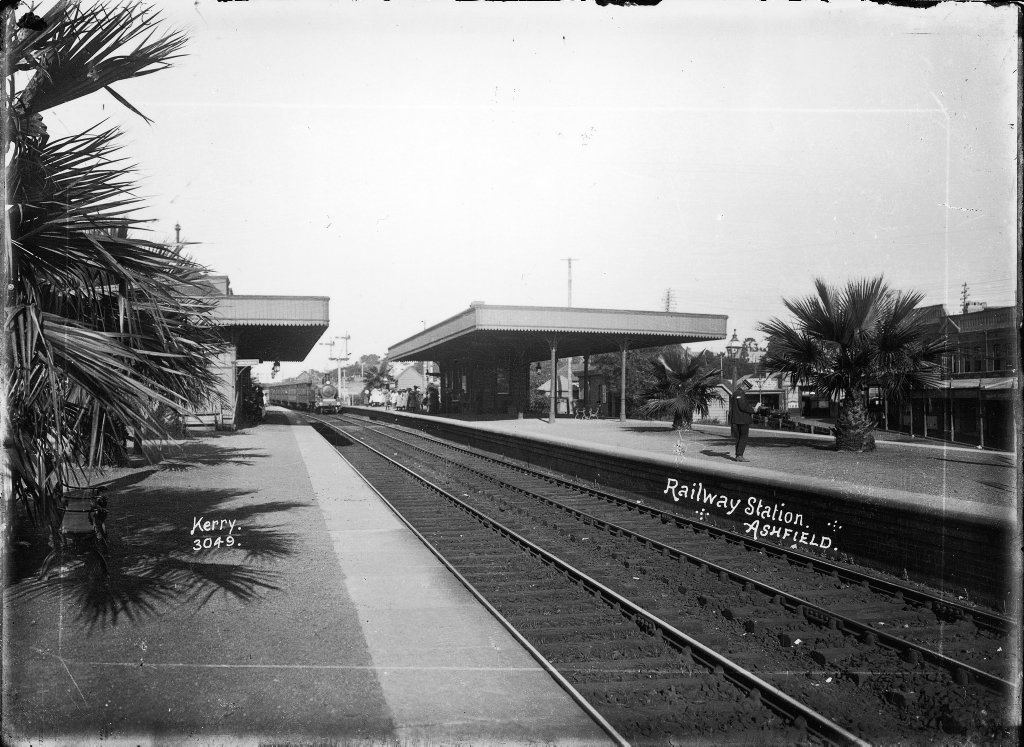
The station c.1900

Ashfield station opened on 26 September 1855 as part of the original Sydney to Parramatta line.

In 2002, the station was largely rebuilt with a new concrete aerial concourse and most of the platform buildings were demolished. Before completion of those facilities, the platforms were accessed from two pedestrian subways which incorporated separate booking offices. The western subway remains as a pedestrian thoroughfare.

In May 2018 Ashfield became the first station in New South Wales to have the OpalPay Park & Ride facility installed.

== Services ==
=== Platforms ===
The station has five platforms (two city bound, two outward bound, and one used as a turnback to the city).

Platform	Line	Stopping pattern	Notes
1		not in regular use	
2		not in regular use	
3	T2	services to Central & the City Circle	
3	T3	services to Central & the City Circle	
4	T2	terminating services to & from Central & the City Circle	
5	T2	services to Homebush, Leppington & Parramatta	
5	T3	services to Liverpool via Regents Park	

=== Transport links ===
Transit Systems operates three bus routes via Ashfield station, under contract to Transport for NSW:

- 406: Five Dock to Hurlstone Park
- 464: to Mortlake via Croydon Park, Burwood and Concord
- 491: Five Dock to Hurstville via Canterbury

Ashfield station is served by three NightRide routes:

- N50: Liverpool station to Town Hall station
- N60: Fairfield station to Town Hall station
- N61: Carlingford station to Town Hall station

== Trackplan ==
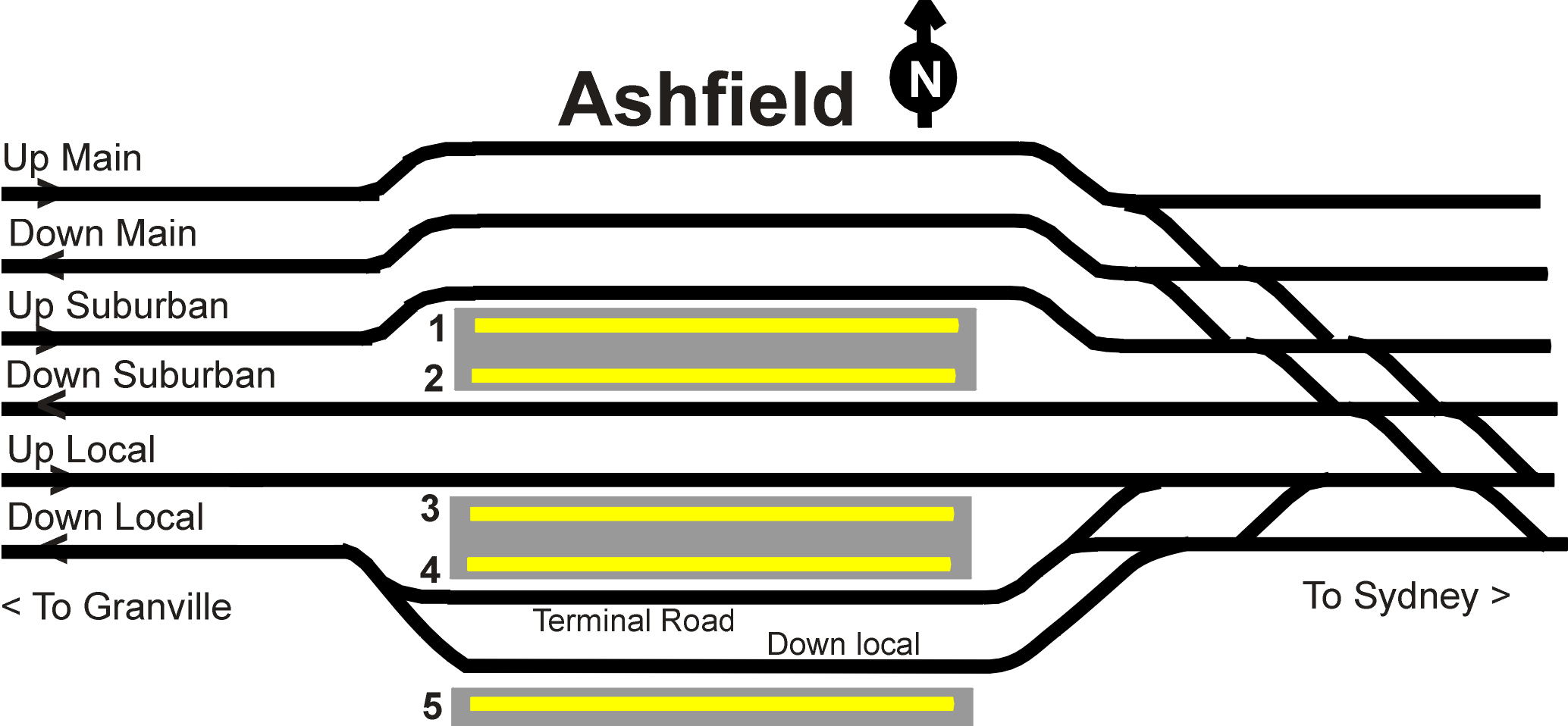
Track diagram of Ashfield Station

== Gallery ==
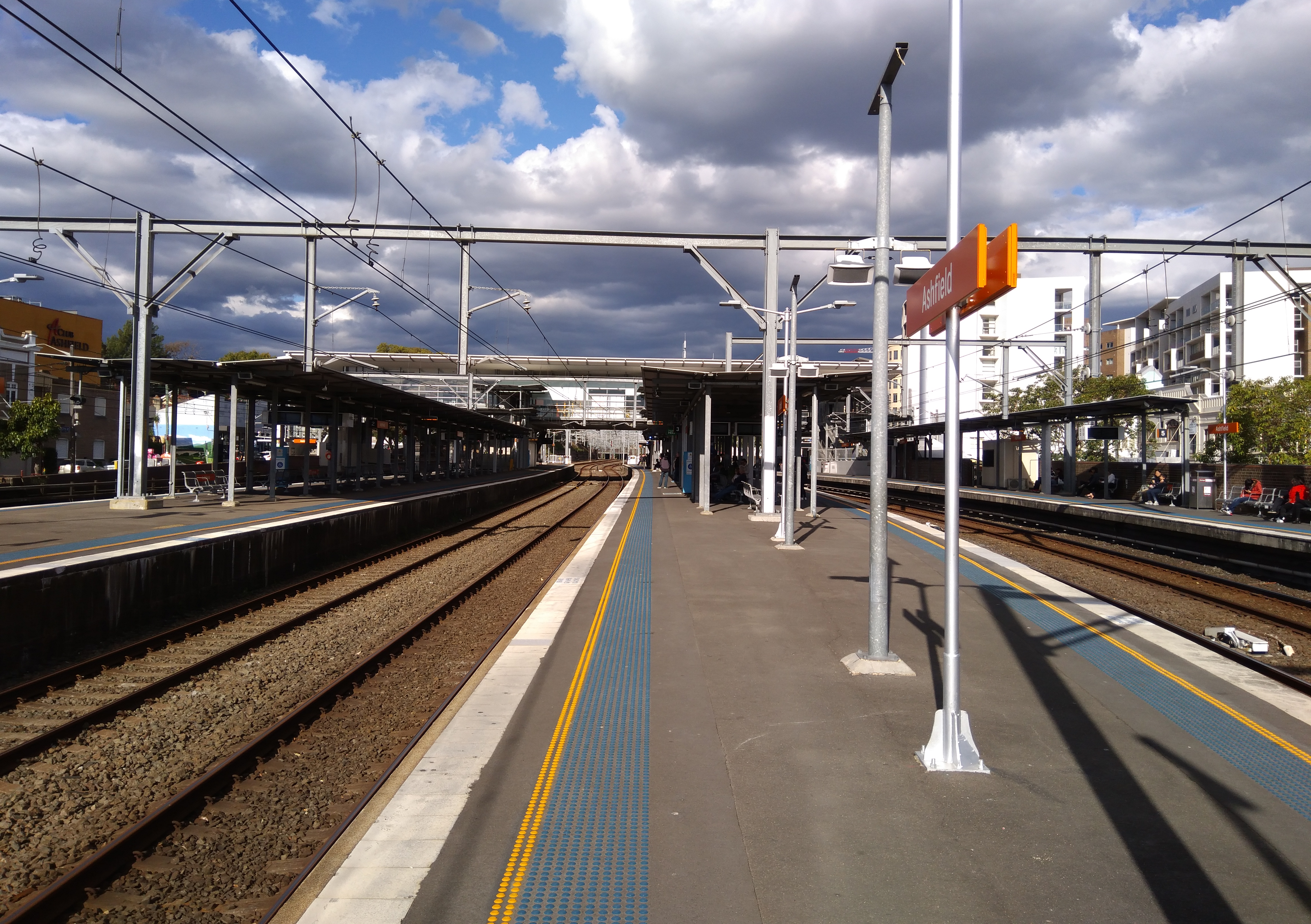
Eastbound view of the platforms in August 2017

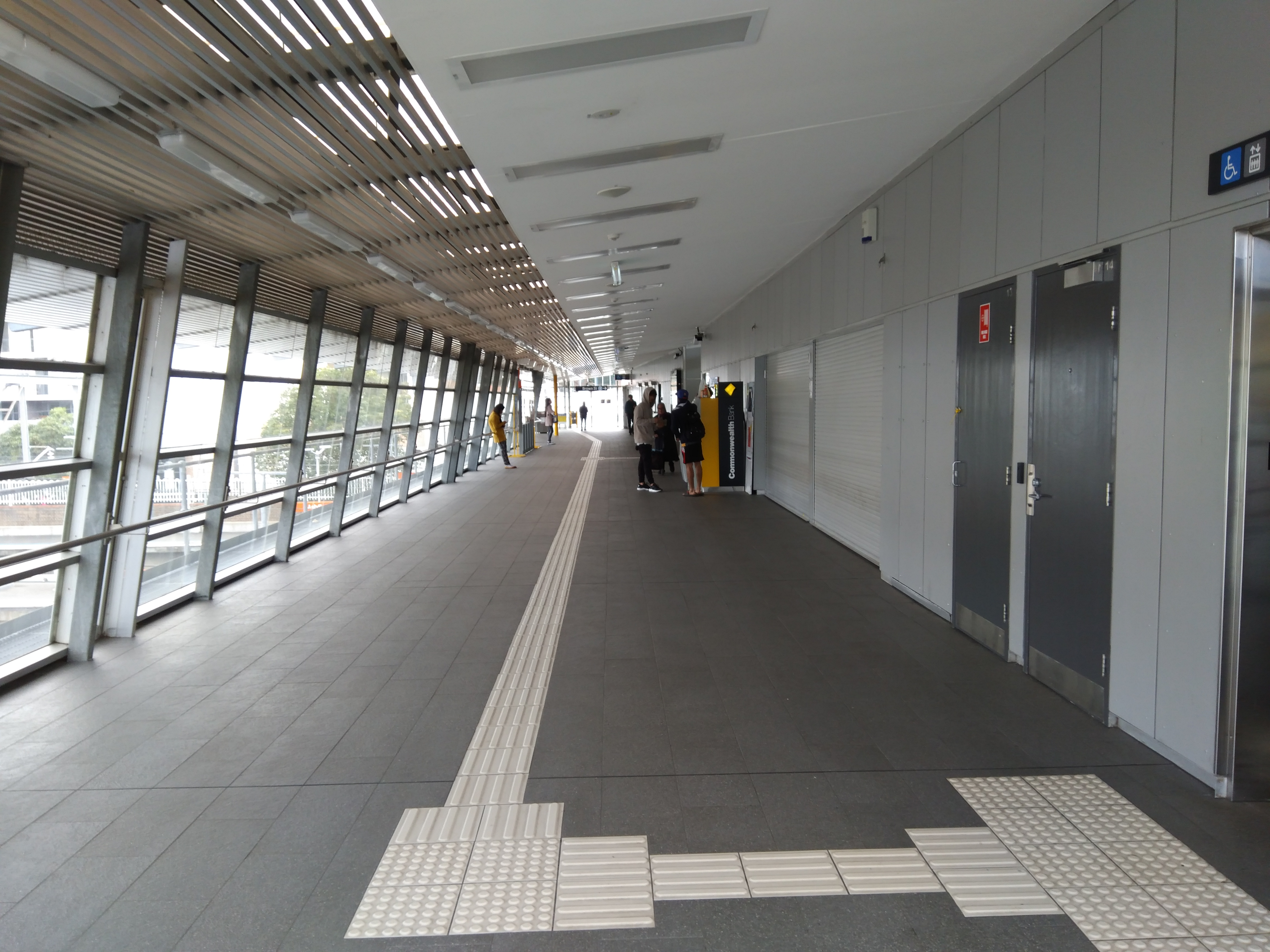
Inside the station concourse in August 2017

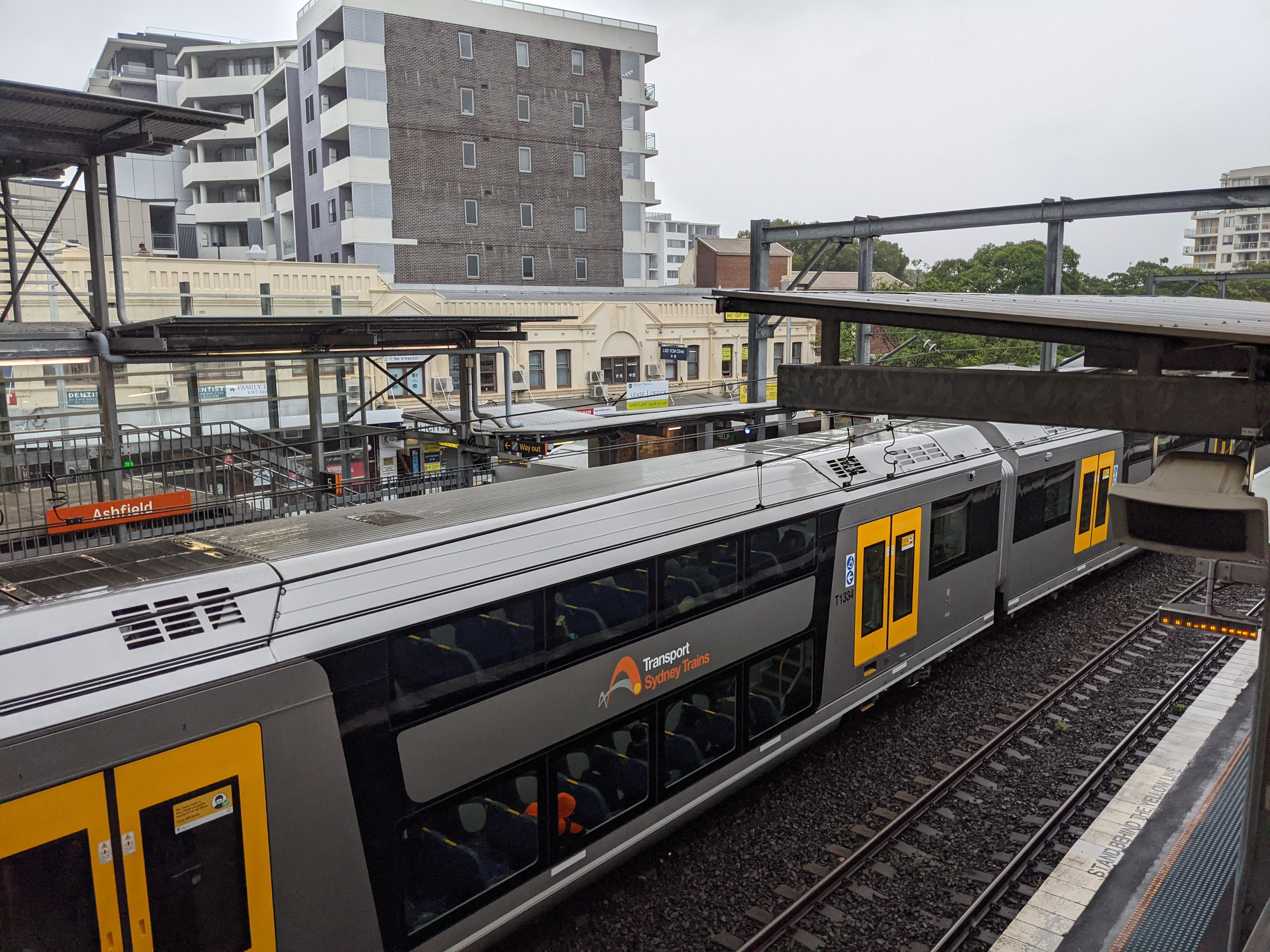
Westbound view from station concourse in March 2021
