= T3 Liverpool & Inner West Line =

Rail service in Sydney, New South Wales, Australia

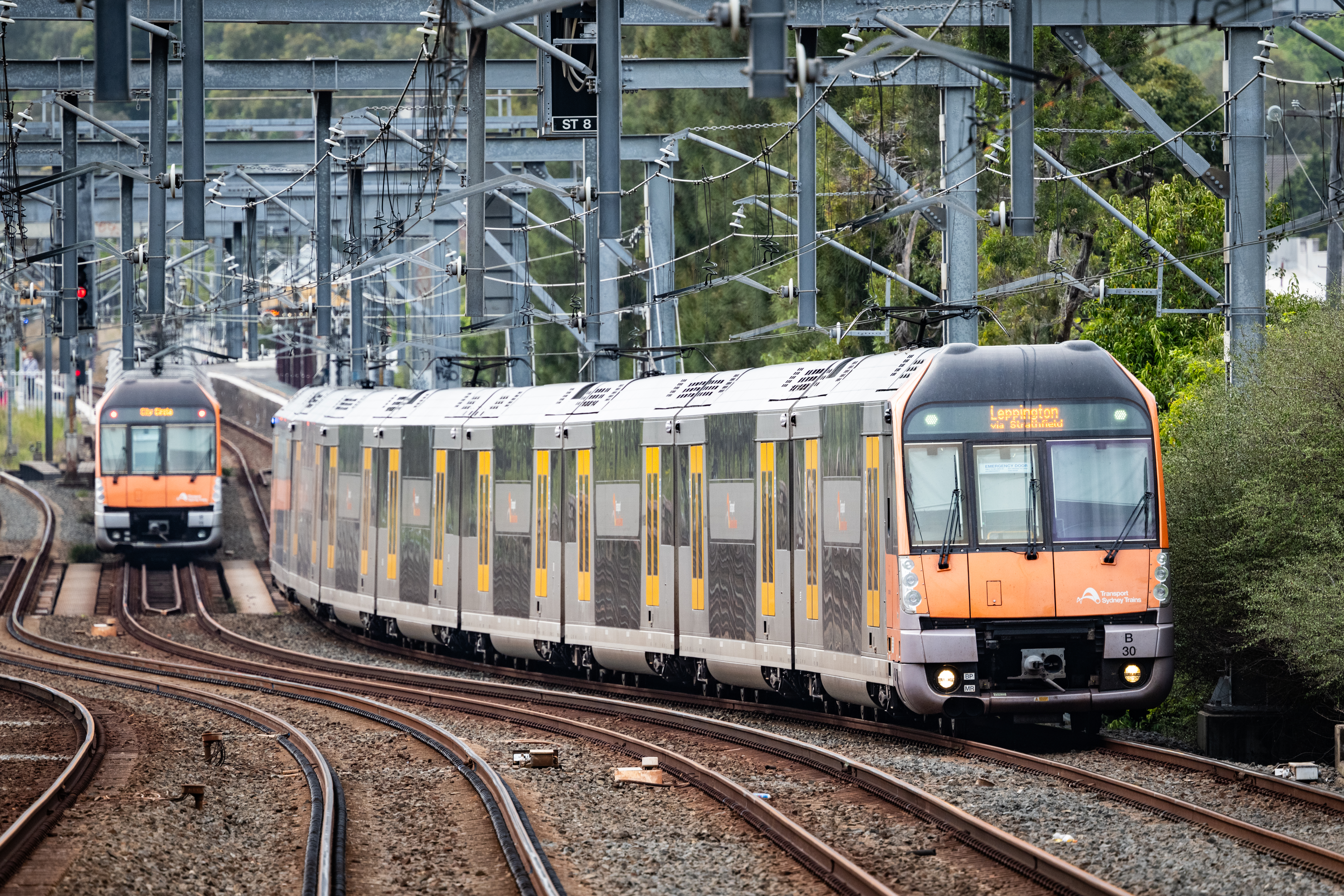
- B sets passing at Summer Hill

Overview
- Service type: Commuter rail service
- Status: Operational
- Locale: Sydney, New South Wales
- Predecessor: Inner West (1999–2013); Bankstown (2013–2024)
- First service: 30 September 2024; 2 years ago
- Current operator: Sydney Trains

Route
- Termini: City Circle; Liverpool
- Stops: 30
- Average journey time: 1 hour
- Lines used: City Circle; Main Suburban; Main Southern

On-board services
- Disabled access: Yes

Technical
- Rolling stock: T, M, A and B sets
- Track gauge: 1,435 mm (4 ft 8 1/2 in) standard gauge
- Electrification: 1,500 V DC from overhead catenary
- Track owner: Transport Asset Manager of New South Wales
- Timetable number: T3
Sydney rail network
Sydney Trains suburban services
T1 North Shore & Western
T2 Leppington & Inner West
T3 Liverpool & Inner West
T4 Eastern Suburbs & Illawarra
T5 Cumberland
T6 Lidcombe & Bankstown
T7 Olympic Park
T8 Airport & South
T9 Northern
Sydney Metro
M1 Metro North West & Bankstown

The T3 Liverpool & Inner West Line is a suburban rail service operated by Sydney Trains in the Inner West and Western suburbs of Sydney. It operates from the City Circle to Liverpool via the Main Suburban railway line to Lidcombe and the Main Southern railway line from there to Liverpool.

Since 2024, the line has been numbered T3 and is coloured orange on maps and wayfinding information.

== History ==
=== Early history ===
The section of the Main Suburban railway line used by Liverpool & Inner West Line services is the oldest railway in New South Wales, having opened in 1855. The section of the Main Southern railway line from Lidcombe to Cabramatta via Regents Park that it also uses is newer, having opened between 1912 and 1924 as deviation to provide a more direct route to Liverpool. Electrification to Liverpool was completed by 1929, after which electric passenger suburban services began operating the same route from Liverpool to the City Circle via Regents Park as they do today.

=== T3 Bankstown Line (2013–2024) ===
Following the 2011 state election, the newly elected O'Farrell government embarked on reform of transport in New South Wales, creating a new organisation, Transport for NSW, in November of that year. This was followed up with another government reform, which saw Sydney Trains take over operation of the Sydney suburban rail network from CityRail in July 2013.

Transport for NSW developed a new rail timetable, which was put into effect on 20 October 2013. The 2013 timetable was designed to integrate the projects of the Rail Clearways Program, a 2004 plan to divide the network's fourteen metropolitan rail lines into five independent "clearways" by installing extra tracks, passing loops, turnouts and turnbacks at pinch points around the network, such as at Homebush and Lidcombe. By 2013, the Rail Clearways Program was substantially complete.

The 2013 timetable saw services from Liverpool to the City Circle via Regents Park, which had previously been operated by CityRail under the name Inner West Line, phased out. Instead, from 2013 stations on the Main Southern railway line between Lidcombe and Cabramatta were only serviced by the T3 Bankstown Line, a Sydney Trains continuation of earlier CityRail services on the Bankstown railway line. This service operated as two branches, one from Liverpool and one from Lidcombe, connecting to the City Circle via Bankstown and Sydenham instead of via the Main Suburban railway line. This configuration utilised the new turnback at Lidcombe, and reduced bottlenecking on the Main Suburban railway line. However, the changes attracted criticism due to the increased number of interchanges and increased travel time for passengers from stations west of Bankstown.

=== T3 Liverpool & Inner West Line (from 2024) ===
From 30 September 2024, a new Sydney Trains timetable was introduced which restored services from Liverpool to the City Circle via Regents Park and the Main Suburban railway line, branded as the T3 Liverpool & Inner West Line. This coincided with the partial closure of the Bankstown railway line between Bankstown and Sydenham for its conversion as part of the Sydney Metro City & Southwest project. The restoration of this service was informed by community consultation undertaken by Transport for NSW in 2020, in which 85% of respondents favoured the option of restoring services from Liverpool to the City Circle via Regents Park.

== Operation ==
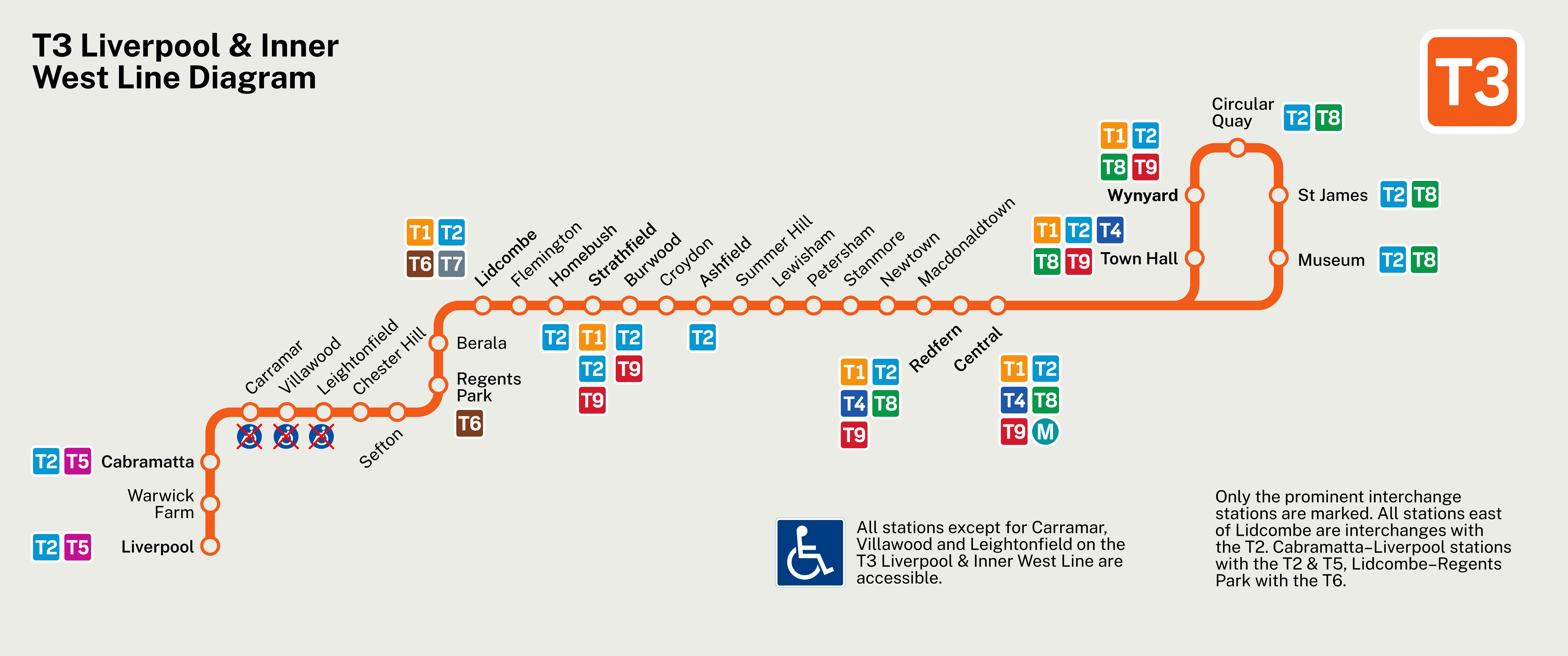
Diagram of the T3 Liverpool & Inner West Line

=== Rolling stock ===
- New South Wales A and B sets 8-car EMUs
- New South Wales M set 8-car EMUs – Weekdays only
- New South Wales T set 8-car EMUs – Weekends only

=== Former ===
- New South Wales K set 8-car EMUs – Peak hours & early mornings (until 17th April 2026)

=== Map ===
T3 interactive map

=== Route ===
T3 Liverpool & Inner West Line services begin in the Sydney CBD on the City Circle. After leaving Central, T3 services use the Main Suburban railway line to travel through the Inner West. At Lidcombe T3 services branch off from the Main Suburban, and use the Main Southern railway line via Regents Park to complete their journey to Liverpool.

T3 stations
Name	Distance from Central	Opened	Railway line	Serving suburbs	Other suburban lines
Museum – Liverpool
Museum	5 km (dist via Town Hall)	1926	City Circle	Sydney	T2 Leppington & Inner West Line T8 Airport & South Line
St James	4.3 km (dist via Town Hall)	1926	City Circle	Sydney	T2 Leppington & Inner West Line T8 Airport & South Line
Circular Quay	3.0 km	1956	City Circle	Circular Quay, Sydney; The Rocks, Millers Point	T2 Leppington & Inner West Line T8 Airport & South Line
Wynyard	2.1 km	1932	City Circle	Sydney, The Rocks, Millers Point	T1 North Shore & Western Line T2 Leppington & Inner West Line T8 Airport & South Line T9 Northern Line
Town Hall	1.2 km	1932	City Circle	Sydney, Darling Harbour	T1 North Shore & Western Line T2 Leppington & Inner West Line T4 Eastern Suburbs & Illawarra Line T8 Airport & South Line T9 Northern Line
Central	0 km	1906	City Circle	Central, Strawberry Hills; Ultimo, Surry Hills	T1 North Shore & Western Line T2 Leppington & Inner West Line T4 Eastern Suburbs & Illawarra Line T8 Airport & South Line T9 Northern Line M1 Metro North West & Bankstown Line
Redfern	1.3 km	1906	Main Suburban	Redfern, Waterloo, Darlington, The University of Sydney	T1 North Shore & Western Line T2 Leppington & Inner West Line T4 Eastern Suburbs & Illawarra Line T8 Airport & South Line T9 Northern Line
Macdonaldtown	2.5 km	1892	Main Suburban	Macdonaldtown	T2 Leppington & Inner West Line
Newtown	3.1 km	1855	Main Suburban	Newtown	T2 Leppington & Inner West Line
Stanmore	4.7 km	1878	Main Suburban	Stanmore	T2 Leppington & Inner West Line
Petersham	5.5 km	1857	Main Suburban	Petersham	T2 Leppington & Inner West Line
Lewisham	6.3 km	1886	Main Suburban	Lewisham	T2 Leppington & Inner West Line
Summer Hill	7.0 km	1879	Main Suburban	Summer Hill	T2 Leppington & Inner West Line
Ashfield	8.4 km	1855	Main Suburban	Ashfield	T2 Leppington & Inner West Line
Croydon	9.4 km	1875	Main Suburban	Croydon	T2 Leppington & Inner West Line
Burwood	10.6 km	1855	Main Suburban	Burwood	T2 Leppington & Inner West Line T9 Northern Line
Strathfield	11.8 km	1876	Main Suburban	Strathfield	T1 North Shore & Western Line T2 Leppington & Inner West Line T9 Northern Line
Homebush	12.7 km	1855	Main Suburban	Homebush	T2 Leppington & Inner West Line
Flemington	14.3 km	1855	Main Suburban	Homebush West	T2 Leppington & Inner West Line
Lidcombe	16.6 km	1858	Main Suburban	Lidcombe	T1 North Shore & Western Line T2 Leppington & Inner West Line T6 Lidcombe & Bankstown Line Olympic Park railway line
Berala	18.4 km	1912	Main Southern	Berala	T6 Lidcombe & Bankstown Line
Regents Park	19.9 km	1912	Main Southern	Regents Park	T6 Lidcombe & Bankstown Line
Sefton	21.2 km	1924	Main Southern	Sefton	none
Chester Hill	22.3 km	1924	Main Southern	Chester Hill	none
Leightonfield	23.7 km	1942	Main Southern	Villawood	none
Villawood	24.5 km	1924	Main Southern	Villawood	none
Carramar	25.9 km	1924	Main Southern	Carramar	none
Cabramatta	28.4 km	1870	Main Southern	Cabramatta	T2 Leppington & Inner West Line T5 Cumberland Line
Warwick Farm	34.2 km	1889	Main Southern	Warwick Farm	T2 Leppington & Inner West Line T5 Cumberland Line
Liverpool	35.7 km	1856	Main Southern	Liverpool	T2 Leppington & Inner West Line T5 Cumberland Line

=== Patronage ===
The following table shows the patronage of Sydney Trains network for the year ending 30 June 2024.

2025–26 Sydney Trains patronage by line (Note: Figures based on Opal tap on and tap off data)
T1 North Shore & Western Line	79,173,811	
T2 Leppington & Inner West Line	56,339,459	
T3 Liverpool & Inner West Line	11,756,216	(Note: T3 patronage split between former route via Bankstown and current route via Strathfield. The Bankstown route closed 30 September 2024.)
T4 Eastern Suburbs & Illawarra Line	63,990,365	
T5 Cumberland Line	7,629,714	
T6 Lidcombe & Bankstown Line	3,307,374	
Olympic Park railway line	2,400,479	
T8 Airport & South Line	54,235,162	
T9 Northern Line	39,379,659	

== See also ==
- Leppington & Inner West Line
