= Main Suburban railway line =

Railway line in Sydney, Australia

Main Suburban railway
- Sydney Metropolitan Rail Area with Main Suburban railway highlighted in black

Overview
- Owner: Transport Asset Manager of New South Wales
- Termini: Redfern; Granville
- Stations: 17

Service
- Services: T1 North Shore & Western; T2 Leppington & Inner West; T3 Liverpool & Inner West; T9 Northern
- Operator: Sydney Trains

History
- Opened: 26 September 1855

Technical
- Track length: 10 km (6.2 mi)
- Num of tracks: 4/6
- Track gauge: 1,435 mm (4 ft 8 1/2 in) standard gauge
- Electrification: Overhead 1500 V DC
- Operating speed: Track speed varies between 50 km/h (on local) and 100 km/h (on main); 43.3 km/h (network average)
Route map
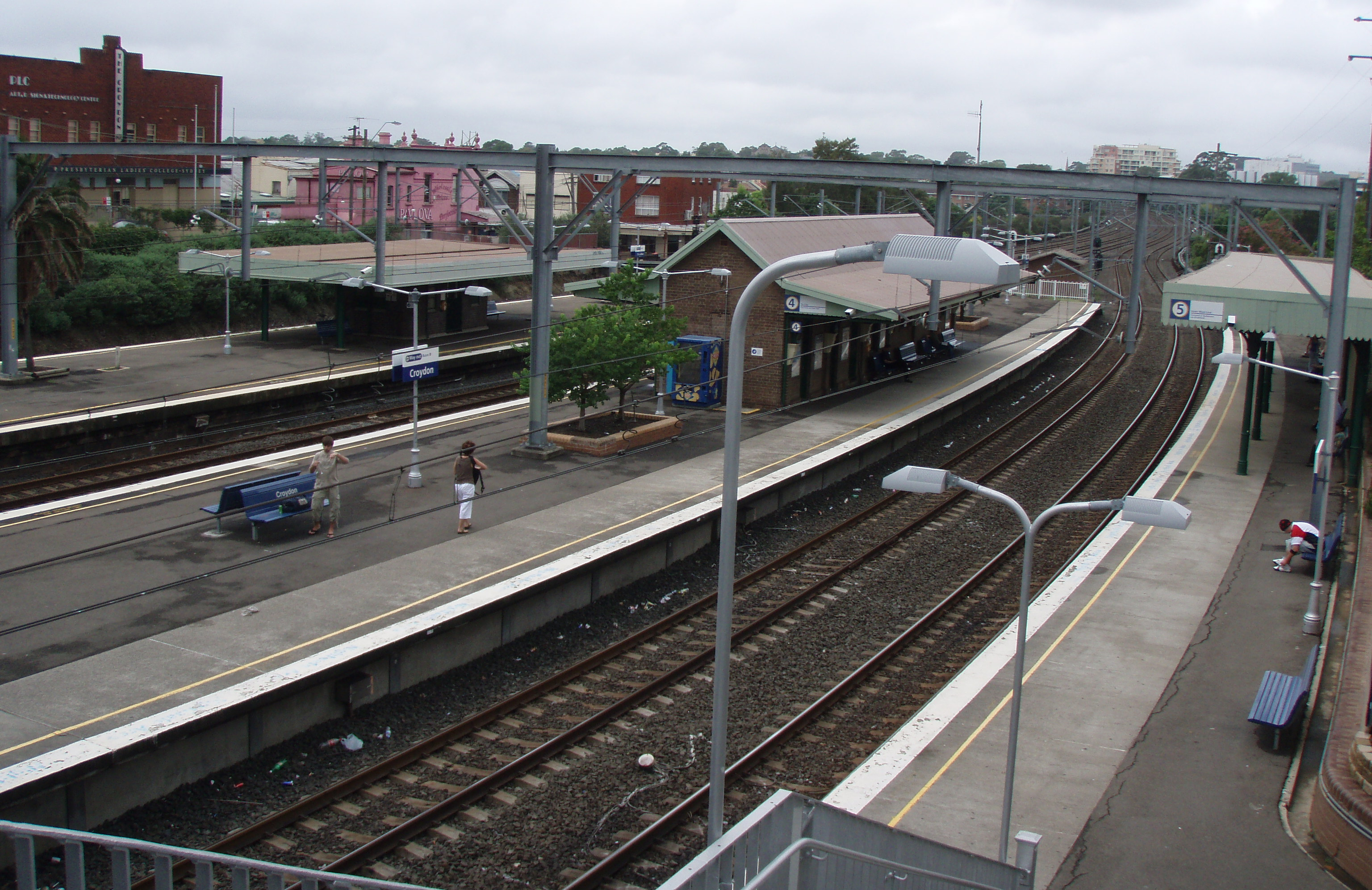
- Main Suburban line through Croydon
- Note: most crossovers not shown

The Main Suburban railway line is the technical name for the trunk railway line between Redfern railway station and Parramatta railway station in Sydney, Australia, but now generally refers to the section between Redfern and where the Old Main South Line branches off at Granville Junction. The railway line then continues on as the Main Western line towards the Blue Mountains. This term distinguished this trunk line from the Illawarra Line which branched south from the Illawarra Junction to Wollongong, and later the North Shore line which carried trains north over the Harbour Bridge.

== History ==
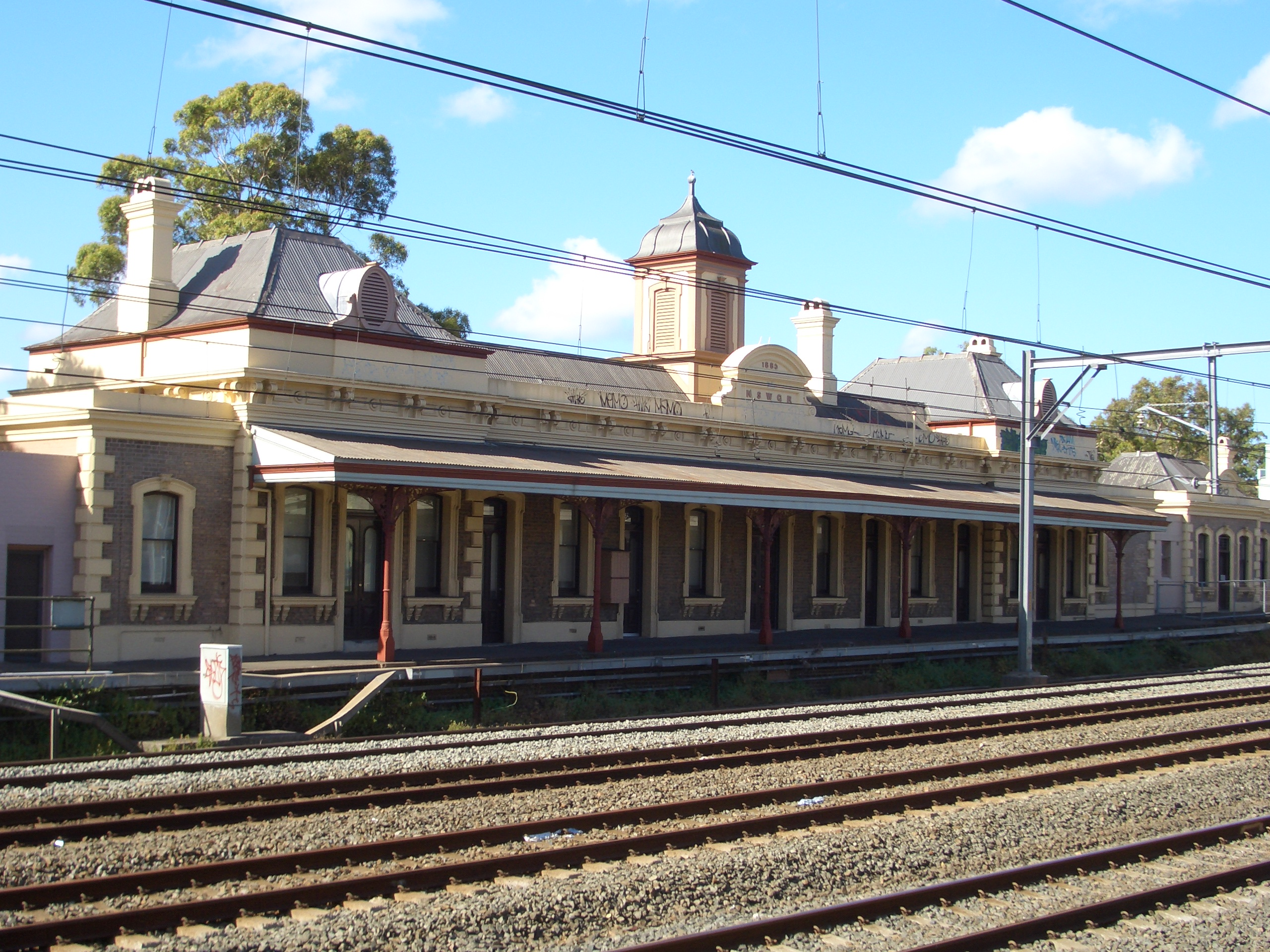
Former Petersham railway station on the Up Main. Replaced by a station on the local tracks

The Main Suburban line between Redfern and Granville was the first railway line to be constructed in New South Wales. The first company to start rail transport in New South Wales was the Sydney Railway Company which was incorporated on 10 October 1849 with the aim of building a railway from Sydney to Parramatta. Capital was raised, shares were sold, and a route was surveyed. The first sod was turned by Mrs Keith Stewart (daughter of the Governor) at Cleveland Paddocks (an area between the southern end of the current Central station and Cleveland Street) on 20 May 1850.

The original engineer appointed was Francis Webb Sheilds, an Irishman. He persuaded the New South Wales legislature to pass an Act on 27 July 1852 requiring all railways in the colony to be of 5 ft 3 in (1,600 mm) gauge. This was the gauge in use in Ireland and is now referred to as 1,600 mm gauge. After Sheilds resigned due to difficulties, a Scot named James Wallace was appointed. Wallace persuaded the legislature to repeal the previous act and replace it, on 4 August 1853, with one requiring a gauge of 4 ft 8 1/2 in (1,435 mm) – the current standard gauge.

The Sydney Railway Company encountered many troubles: engineers came and went; real estate required became expensive and difficult to acquire; money, supplies and manpower ran short, partly because of a gold rush. Eventually the property of the Sydney Railway Company was transferred to the government of New South Wales on 3 September 1855.

The line opened on 26 September 1855, from Sydney to Parramatta Junction (near Granville Station), with stations at Newtown, Ashfield, Burwood and Homebush. The Sydney terminal station was on the south side of Devonshire Street, just south of the current Central station. Although the vicinity was sometimes referred to as Redfern, it was not near the current Redfern station.

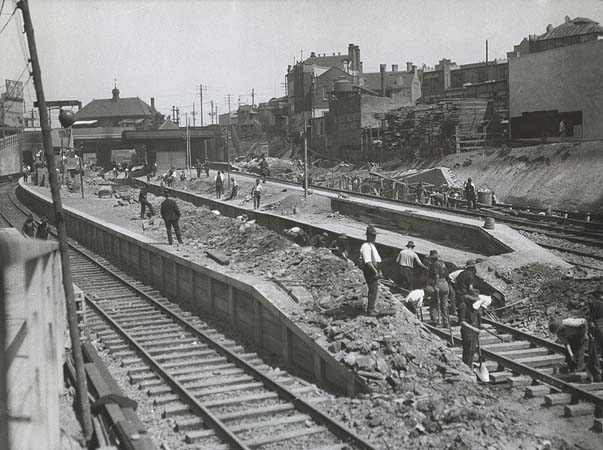
Sextuplication works at Newtown station in 1927

The line was quadrupled to Flemington on 31 December 1893. The line saw its most dramatic change when the section from Redfern to Homebush was expanded from four to six tracks by the addition of two tracks initially intended for non-electric express trains that opened on 30 October 1927. Prior to 1927, all stations on the line had platform faces to all four tracks, and the tracks were labelled as fast and slow. After the completion of works in 1927, only Redfern and Strathfield had platform faces on all six tracks. The four tracks now known as the Up and Down Local lines and the Up and Down Suburban Lines were electrified in 1928. It was not until 1955 that the Up and Down Main Lines were also electrified to coincide with the opening of the Blue Mountains electrification programme.

Double-deck trailer cars were introduced between 1964 and 1967 replacing old wooden trailer cars in the Iine's electric multiple unit passenger trains.

== Description of route ==
The line commences at Illawarra Junction south of Redfern station, the junction point of the Illawarra railway line. The line consists of three pairs of electrified tracks, six in total, which head west through the Inner Western suburbs of Sydney to Strathfield. The tracks are named Up and Down Main, Up and Down Suburban, and Up and Down Local. The Main lines are express lines which have no intermediate platforms between Redfern and Burwood, and carry NSW TrainLink and some T9 Northern services. The inner Suburban pair of tracks have some intermediate platforms and generally carry T1 North Shore & Western and T9 Northern suburban services. The southernmost Local pair of tracks have platforms at all intermediate stations and carry all-stations and limited stops T2 Leppington & Inner West Line and T3 Liverpool & Inner West Line services.

At Strathfield, there is a grade separated junction with the Main North line. There is also a single track link that takes freight trains from the Main North west, joining onto a goods line that runs parallel to the Main Suburban. At the next station, Homebush, the local tracks end. Generally, trains on the suburban track merge onto the main, while trains on the local either terminate or merge on the suburban track. The line then continues to Flemington, where there is a complex double triangle junction around Flemington Maintenance Depot, which provides access from the main tracks to the Olympic Park line and the Sydney Freight Network.

A bit further west is Lidcombe, where there is another triangle junction, connecting the suburban tracks to the Main Southern railway line. Continuing down the line, there are further junctions with various yards and workshops at Auburn, including Auburn Maintenance Centre and Maintrain, and the now closed Carlingford railway line at Clyde. At Granville, the line ends with a triangle junction, continuing onto either the Main Western Line or the Old Main South line.

Speed limits on the route vary between locations and tracks (main, suburban or local). The main generally has the highest speed limits, around 80 km/h (50 mph), with some 90 or 100 km/h (56 or 62 mph) sections. The suburban and local tracks vary between 50 and 80 km/h (31 and 50 mph) limits. The limits on the suburban and local reduce to 50 km/h (31 mph) around bridges on curves at Newtown and Ashfield, as the bridges have their supports between the running lines, with a risk of bridge collapse if a train were to derail at high speed, similar to the Granville rail disaster.

== Stations ==
Station	Platforms	Served by
Macdonaldtown	2	T2 Leppington & Inner West Line T3 Liverpool & Inner West Line
Newtown	2	T2 Leppington & Inner West Line T3 Liverpool & Inner West Line
Stanmore	3	T2 Leppington & Inner West Line T3 Liverpool & Inner West Line
Petersham	2	T2 Leppington & Inner West Line T3 Liverpool & Inner West Line
Lewisham	2	T2 Leppington & Inner West Line T3 Liverpool & Inner West Line
Summer Hill	3	T2 Leppington & Inner West Line T3 Liverpool & Inner West Line
Ashfield	5 (inc 1 turnback)	T2 Leppington & Inner West Line T3 Liverpool & Inner West Line
Croydon	5	T2 Leppington & Inner West Line T3 Liverpool & Inner West Line
Burwood	6	T2 Leppington & Inner West Line T3 Liverpool & Inner West Line T9 Northern Line
Strathfield	8	T1 North Shore & Western Line T2 Leppington & Inner West Line T3 Liverpool & Inner West Line T9 Northern Line Blue Mountains Line Central Coast & Newcastle Line
Homebush	6 (inc 1 turnback)	T2 Leppington & Inner West Line T3 Liverpool & Inner West Line
Flemington	4	T2 Leppington & Inner West Line T3 Liverpool & Inner West Line
Lidcombe	4 (plus 1 turnback for Olympic Park line & 1 for Bankstown line)	T1 North Shore & Western Line T2 Leppington & Inner West Line T3 Liverpool & Inner West Line T6 Lidcombe & Bankstown Line Olympic Park railway line
Auburn	4	T1 North Shore & Western Line T2 Leppington & Inner West Line
Clyde	4 (plus 1 fenced off, 1 formerly for Carlingford line)	T1 North Shore & Western Line T2 Leppington & Inner West Line
Granville	4	T1 North Shore & Western Line T2 Leppington & Inner West Line
