= Woodstock (disambiguation) =

Woodstock was a 1969 music festival in Bethel, New York, U.S.

Woodstock may also refer to:

== Places ==
=== Australia ===
- Woodstock, New South Wales
- Woodstock, Queensland
- Woodstock, Tasmania, a locality
- Woodstock, Victoria

=== Canada ===
- Woodstock, New Brunswick, a town in Carleton County
- Woodstock Parish, New Brunswick, civil parish surrounding the town
- Woodstock (electoral district), a provincial electoral district for the Legislative Assembly of New Brunswick
- Woodstock, Newfoundland and Labrador
- Woodstock, Nova Scotia
- Woodstock, Ontario
  - Woodstock railway station (Ontario)

=== Ireland ===
- Woodstock Estate, a wooded estate by the river Nore

=== New Zealand ===
- Woodstock, Tasman, near Motueka, in the northwestern South Island
- Woodstock, Waikato, now called Fairfield, a suburb of Hamilton
- Woodstock, West Coast, near Kaniere, in the western South Island

=== South Africa ===
- Woodstock, Cape Town
  - Woodstock (House of Assembly of South Africa constituency), a former constituency
  - Woodstock railway station (Cape Town), a Metrorail railway station in Woodstock, Cape Town

=== United Kingdom ===
- Woodstock, Oxfordshire, a small town in Oxfordshire, England
  - Woodstock (UK Parliament constituency), a defunct Parliamentary constituency
  - Woodstock Palace, a former royal residence
- Woodstock, Belfast, an electoral ward of East Belfast
- Woodstock, Kent, a location in Kent
- Woodstock, Pembrokeshire, Wales

=== United States ===
- Woodstock, Alabama
- Woodstock, Alameda, California
- Woodstock, Connecticut
- Woodstock, Georgia
- Woodstock Country Club, Indiana
- Woodstock, Illinois
  - Woodstock station (Illinois), a commuter rail station in the city of Woodstock, Illinois
- Woodstock Township, Schuyler County, Illinois
- Woodstock, Kentucky, a former community near Louisville, Kentucky, now annexed to Graymoor-Devondale
- Woodstock, Maine
- Woodstock, Maryland
- Woodstock Township, Michigan
- Woodstock, Minnesota
- Woodstock, New Hampshire
- Woodstock, New York
  - Woodstock (CDP), New York, the primary hamlet within the town of Woodstock
- Woodstock, Ohio
- Woodstock, Portland, Oregon
  - Woodstock Park (Portland, Oregon)
- Woodstock, Vermont
  - Woodstock (village), Vermont, in the town of Woodstock
- Woodstock, Virginia
  - Battle of Woodstock, an American Civil War battle near Woodstock, Virginia
- Woodstock, Northampton County, Virginia
- Woodstock, Wisconsin

== Buildings ==
- Woodstock, Burwood, a mansion in New South Wales, Australia
- Woodstock (Lexington, Kentucky), listed on the NRHP in Fayette County, Kentucky
- Woodstock (Natchez, Mississippi), a Greek Revival house in the U.S.
- Woodstock (Scotland Neck, North Carolina), a plantation house in the U.S.
- Woodstock (Trenton, Kentucky), a mansion house in the U.S.
- Woodstock (Upper Marlboro, Maryland), a house in the U.S.
- Woodstock (Wilmington, Delaware), a house in the U.S.
- Woodstock Arms, a public house in Manchester, England

== People ==
- Edmund of Woodstock, 1st Earl of Kent (1301–1330), son of Edward I of England
- Mary of Woodstock (1279–1332), daughter of Edward I of England
- Thomas of Woodstock, 1st Duke of Gloucester (1355–1397), son of Edward III of England
- William Bentinck, Viscount Woodstock (born 1984), writer and social entrepreneur

== Arts, entertainment, and media ==
=== Literature ===
- Woodstock (novel), 1826, by Walter Scott
- Thomas of Woodstock (play), which has been spuriously attributed to Shakespeare

=== Music ===
==== Festivals ====
- Woodstock Festival, original festival 1969
  - Woodstock Sound-Outs, mini-festivals held outside Woodstock, NY from 1967 to 1970
  - Woodstock '79, 10th anniversary rock concert that took place at Madison Square Garden
  - Woodstock '89, "The Forgotten Woodstock", 20th anniversary rock concert that took place in August 1989 on the site of the original Woodstock concert
  - Woodstock '94, 25th anniversary music festival
  - Woodstock '99, 30th anniversary music festival
  - Woodstock 50, cancelled 50th anniversary music festival
- The Harlem Cultural Festival, also known as the "Black Woodstock", a series of music concerts in New York City held in 1969
- Przystanek Woodstock, an annual Polish music festival, named after the 1969 event
- Woodstock en Beauce, a summer festival in Southern Quebec, Canada
- Woodstockert, an event held at Stockert Radio Telescope, Germany

==== Albums ====
- Woodstock: Music from the Original Soundtrack and More, a live album from the 1969 festival
- Woodstock Two, the second live album from the 1969 festival
- Woodstock: Three Days of Peace and Music, a box set of performances from the 1969 festival
- Woodstock 40 Years On: Back To Yasgur's Farm, a box set of performances from the 1969 festival
- Woodstock (Jimi Hendrix album), 1994
- Woodstock (Portugal. The Man album), 2017
- Woodstock 1999 (album), a live album from the 1999 festival
- Woodstock – Back to the Garden: The Definitive 50th Anniversary Archive, a 38-disc box set of the music of the 1969 festival

==== Songs ====
- "Woodstock" (song), 1970 by Joni Mitchell, covered by Crosby, Stills, Nash & Young and other artists
- "Woodstock", a song by Big and Rich from the deluxe digital version of Between Raising Hell and Amazing Grace
- "Woodstock (Psychedelic Fiction)", a song by American rapper/singer-songwriter Jon Bellion

=== Other arts, entertainment, and media ===
- Woodstock (film), a 1970 documentary about the 1969 festival
- Woodstock (Peanuts), a character in the comic strip Peanuts
- Woodstock Express (disambiguation), a number of roller coasters operated by Cedar Fair and named for the character
- Woodstock Film Festival, an American film festival that was launched in 2000

== Education ==
- Woodstock Academy, a school in Woodstock, Connecticut, U.S.
- Woodstock College, a former Jesuit seminary in Maryland, U.S.
- Woodstock Theological Center, a Catholic theological research institute in Washington D.C.
- Woodstock Elementary School (disambiguation)
- Woodstock High School (disambiguation)
- Woodstock School (disambiguation)

== Other uses ==
- Woodstock, a typewriter invented by Alvah C. Roebuck
- Maupin Woodstock One, glider
- Woodstock Pub, a pub in Bangkok, Thailand

== See also ==
- Woodstock Airport (disambiguation)
- Woodstock Road (disambiguation)
