= Woodstock Township =

Woodstock Township may refer to the following places:

- Woodstock Township, Schuyler County, Illinois
- Woolstock Township, Wright County, Iowa
- Woodstock Township, Lenawee County, Michigan

See also

- Woodstock (disambiguation)
