= Woodstock School (disambiguation) =

Woodstock School is a school in Landour / Mussoorie, Uttarakhand, India.

Woodstock School may also refer to:

- Woodstock Day School, Saugerties, New York
- Woodstock Elementary School (disambiguation)
- Woodstock High School (disambiguation)

== See also ==
- Woodstock College
- Woodstock Elementary School (disambiguation)
- Woodstock High School (disambiguation)
