= The Priory, Burwood =

Heritage-listed residence in Sydney

The Priory and grounds
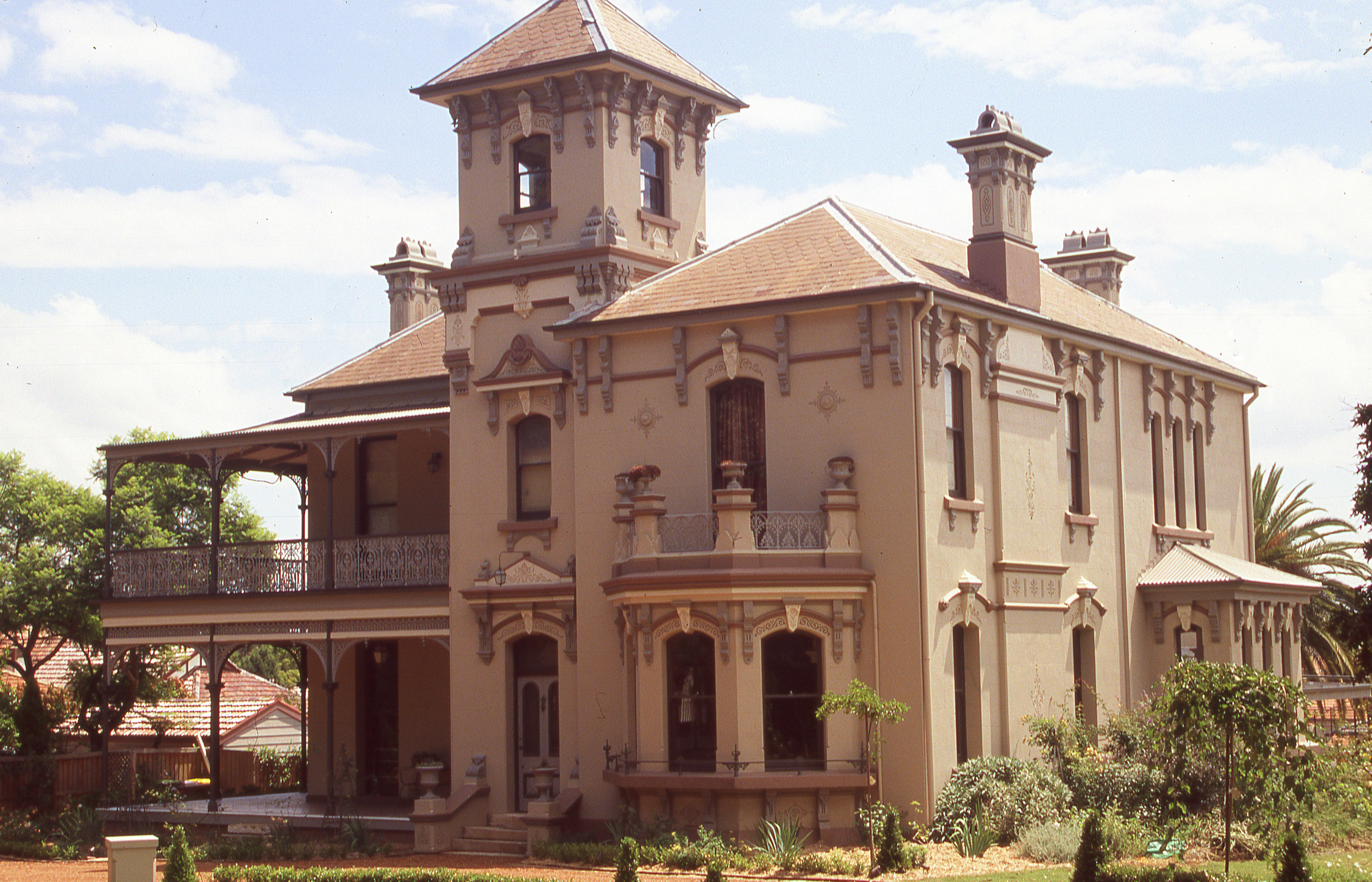
- The Priory, c1987

- Location within Sydney Location within Australia
- 33°53′00″S 151°06′07″E
- Location: 213 Burwood Road, Burwood, Municipality of Burwood, New South Wales, Australia

History
- Built: 1877

New South Wales Heritage Register
- Official name: Priory and Grounds; The Priory & Grounds
- Type: State heritage (complex / group)
- Designated: 2 April 1999
- Reference no.: 287
- Type: Mansion
- Category: Residential buildings (private)

The Priory is a heritage-listed residence at 213 Burwood Road, in the Sydney suburb of Burwood in the Municipality of Burwood local government area of New South Wales, Australia. It was built in 1877. The Priory and its grounds was added to the New South Wales State Heritage Register on 2 April 1999.

== History ==
=== Burwood ===
Parramatta Road was first created in 1791, a vital land (rather than water) artery between Sydney Cove and Rose Hill's settlement and crops. Liverpool Road opened in 1814 as Governor Macquarie's Great South Road. Its winding route reflects pre-existing land grant boundaries and topography. To Burwood's north over Parramatta Road was Longbottom Government Farm, staffed by convicts. This grew to over 280 hectares (700 acres) on heavily timbered flat, sloping to swamps on Hen and Chicken Bay. Commissioner Bigge recorded how valuable timber (ironbark) was cut and sawn on the spot, conveyed to Sydney in boats by the river. "Charcoal for the forges and foundries is likewise prepared here" he noted.

Two grants, over Burwood's clay soil, were important to the area's development: Captain Thomas Rowley's Burwood Farm estate and William Faithful's 400-hectare (1,000-acre) grant to its south in Enfield covered most of modern Burwood. Rowley, adjutant of the NSW Corps, named it after the farm he'd lived on in Cornwall. 1799 and subsequent grants brought it to 300 hectares (750 acres) but he continued to live at Kingston Farm in Newtown until his death in 1806. He'd bought some of the first Spanish merinos brought from the Cape Colony in 1797, others being sold to Macarthur, Marsden & Cox. The southern boundary of his farm was approximately today's Woodside Avenue and Fitzroy Street.

Under Rowley's will the estate passed to his three underage children. Executors Dr Harris and Major Johnstone were both involved in the 1808 Bligh rebellion and returned to England for the court martial, so Governor Macquarie appointed Thomas Moore as guardian and executor. In 1812 he wrongfully auctioned the estate. It was bought by Sydney businessman Alexander Riley. He's believed to have built Burwood Villa in 1814 (perhaps on older (1797) foundations of Rowley's shepherd's cottage) and lived here until departing for England in 1817. 200 hectares (500 acres) had been cleared for pasture. In 1824 Joseph Lycett described the estate in Views of Australia, as "a garden of 4 acres in full cultivation, containing upwards of three hundred Trees, bearing the following choice fruits, viz. The Orange, Citron, Lemon, Pomegranate, Loquat, Guava, Peaches, Nectarines, Apricots, Apples, Pears, the Cherry, Plums, Figs, Chestnuts, Almonds, Medlars, Quinces; with abundance of Raspberries, Strawberries, and the finest Melons. &c;".

Until the 1830s Burwood consisted of a few inns along the highways and two or three huge, undeveloped estates. Within the next 20 years these began to break up, attracting settlers and encouraging the growth of nascent villages at Burwood and Enfield. Riley died in 1833 and Rowley's children, now of age, started legal proceedings and regained possession of the 750-acre estate. It was divided between Thomas jnr., John, John Lucas and Henry Biggs. Almost at once they subdivided into lots of 1.6–8.1 hectares (4–20 acres) for country homes and small farms. In 1834 the Burwood estate was held by John Lucas, husband of Thomas's daughter Mary Rowley), who divided 46 hectares (113 acres) of his 86 hectares (213 acres) into small allotments for sale. Streets such as Webb, Lucas Road, Wentworth Road and Strathfield's The Boulevarde reflect the boundaries of these subdivisions/estates.

To the south (including the land that later become the Appian Way) was William Faithful's grant of 400 hectares (1,000 acres) (1808) at "Liberty Plains". Faithful was a private in the NSW Corps: discharged in 1799 he became Captain Foveaux's farm manager, and this connection got him the grant. Apart from 6.1 hectares (15 acres) of Sarah Nelson's on Malvern Hill (Croydon), Faithful's Farm extended from Rowley's farm to Cooks River and west to Punchbowl Road. The government retained a right to build a road through it (doing so in 1815: Liverpool Road or the Great South Road, now the Hume Highway), and to cut "such timber as may be deemed fit for naval purposes" - the area was thick with tall ironbark. Faithful exchanged it in 1815. Alexander Riley bought his 81 hectares (200 acres) north of the new road incorporating it into his Burwood estate. This was jointly owned by the Rowley family after 1833 and had no streets across it, only a few tracks.

Despite opening up of the Rowley estate there was little settlement in Burwood between the two highways before 1860. Sydney Railway Company opened the first railway line to Parramatta in 1855. Burwood "station" (just west of Ashfield station, one of the first stations) was a wooden platform near a level crossing over the grassy track that was Neich's Lane (later Burwood Road). This was beside "the newly laid out township of Cheltenham". Speedy transport meant subdivision and consolidation followed, filling out the area. Burwood's biggest growth spurt was between 1874 & 1900 (Burwood's population was, respectively: 1200–7400, an increase not matched since. 1835 maps show this as the only track between Parramatta / Liverpool Roads in Burwood.

Burwood's first public school was established c. 1838. In 1843 land on Burwood Road was granted to the Anglican Church for a school. St. Mary's Catholic Church opened in 1846, a Presbyterian Church in 1857 and St. Paul's Anglican in 1871. Mansions of the 1870s such as The Priory were built here due to a firm belief in its health-giving climate, compared to the smog and crowding of the city suburbs. They were built as quasi-ancestral estates, perhaps in blissful ignorance of how quickly suburbs can evolve. Living was primitive: no street lighting (until 1883), home lighting by candle or lamp (oil, kerosene after 1860), no gas (until 1882), no piped water (until 1886), home wells/tanks, few bathrooms, no indoor toilets, with pans (from 1880) replacing outdoor cess pits.

The 1880s was the era of the debates that led to Australia's fractious states combining into a single Federation, declared at Sydney's Centennial Park, in 1901. Skilled tradesmen and materials were plentiful and comparatively cheap, and combined with the improvement in building techniques associated with cavity walls, damp-courses and terracotta tiled roofs, provided the means for an era of intense building activity. Unlike the Victorian era's large commercial and Government building, the main thrust of the Federation era was constructing new suburbs around Sydney harbour with shops for the middle classes.

Between 1889 and 1918 Australia's population swelled from three to five million triggering an urgent need for housing. Suburban spread was greatly assisted by expansion of the public transport system of trams, ferries and trams, which formed a well-integrated pre-car transport system. Rapid suburban growth brought increased interest in town planning and the British concept (Ebenezer Howard's 'Garden City') of the Garden Suburb, spurred on by the Federal Capital Competition of 1912. 1913's arrival from North America of winners, Walter Burley & Marion Mahony Griffin, saw formation of the Town Planning Association of NSW, with architect John Sulman as president. Founding members Sulman and J. P. Fitzgerald were among witnesses at the 1900 Royal Commission into the Improvement of the City of Sydney and suburbs. This made the first attempt at a comprehensive review of Sydney's problems, gathering many reform ideas. It recognised the relationship between planning and local government and advocated introduction of a town planning bill along the lines of John Burns' 1900 English Bill. Some recommendations, such as introducing building regulations for the whole metropolitan area "to prevent the straggling of suburbs and to ensure development along harmonious lines" went into 1919's Local Government Act.

The "Garden Suburb" came to mean a suburb with special areas zoned for different uses, e.g.: residential and commercial; an absence of attached terraces with free-standing houses, wide tree-lined streets, "nature strips" on footpaths, parks reserves and gardens. Much-derided rear lanes and rights-of-way became redundant with sewerage and the provision of side access between houses. Verandas and bay windows were means of integrating house & garden.

Tree-lined streets such as Burwood Road, The Appian Way or The Boulevard in Strathfield were in marked contrast to most development in Australian cities of the late 19th century.

=== The Priory ===
The Priory was built by grazier Mowbray Forrest, in 1877 on land purchased from C. H. Humphrey. Forrest was a prominent citizen and trustee of the Burwood School of Arts.

It is representative of the mansions that were built to house the wealthy families of the late nineteenth century, dating from 1877 and being one of the first mansions on Burwood Road, with an expansive garden. It is a reminder that Burwood was one of Sydney's fashionable suburbs for the well to do.

== Description ==
The Priory is representative of mansions that were built to house the wealthy families of the late nineteenth century. It is a two-storey Victorian mansion dating from 1877, one of the first on Burwood Road. It features a three-storey elaborately decorated tower, a two-storey verandah with cast iron balustrades and an attractive bay window. It has an expansive garden.

An excellent example of the great Victorian mansions and a reminder that Burwood was one of Sydney's fashionable suburbs for the well to do. The house has fine external applied detailing and has retained its landscaping. It is a good example of its period and a rare survival in condition and setting. Two storey Victorian mansion with three storey tower. Built of brick, cement and stone foundations. Walls are cemented and painted, the tower is richly ornamented. Front projecting wing and two storey decorative cast iron verandahs. Front projecting wing has decorated bay window on ground floor and forms open verandah to first floor with edging of decorative iron well landscaped gardens, lawns and driveway.

It has an expansive garden - a rare survivor and evidence of Burwood's onetime prominence among Sydney's fashionable suburbs. The mansion is well set back from Burwood Road with a semi-circular sweep of carriage loop in gravel, edged with recently replanted box hedges (Buxus sempervirens). To the mansion's north-west and rear is a fenced tennis court.

The front garden's detailed plantings have recently been reinstated (gravel drive, box hedges, cast iron fountain). A number of mature large trees line the front iron fence facing Burwood Road between the two drive entry gates: a Queensland /macadamia nut (Macadamia integrifolia), lemon-scented gums (Corymbia citriodora), Port Jackson figs (Ficus rubiginosa), a Canary Island date palm (Phoenix canariensis), camphor laurel (Cinnamomum camphora), brush box (Lophostemon confertus) and another species of fig (Ficus ?microphylla). To the south on Minna Avenue are more mature figs which indicate the extent of The Priory's land prior to subdivision on this side.

=== Modifications and dates ===
The front garden's detailed plantings have recently been reinstated (gravel drive, box hedges, cast iron fountain).

== Heritage listing ==
The Priory and Grounds was listed on the New South Wales State Heritage Register on 2 April 1999.

== See also ==
- Australian residential architectural styles
