= Burwood, New South Wales =

Burwood
- Suburb
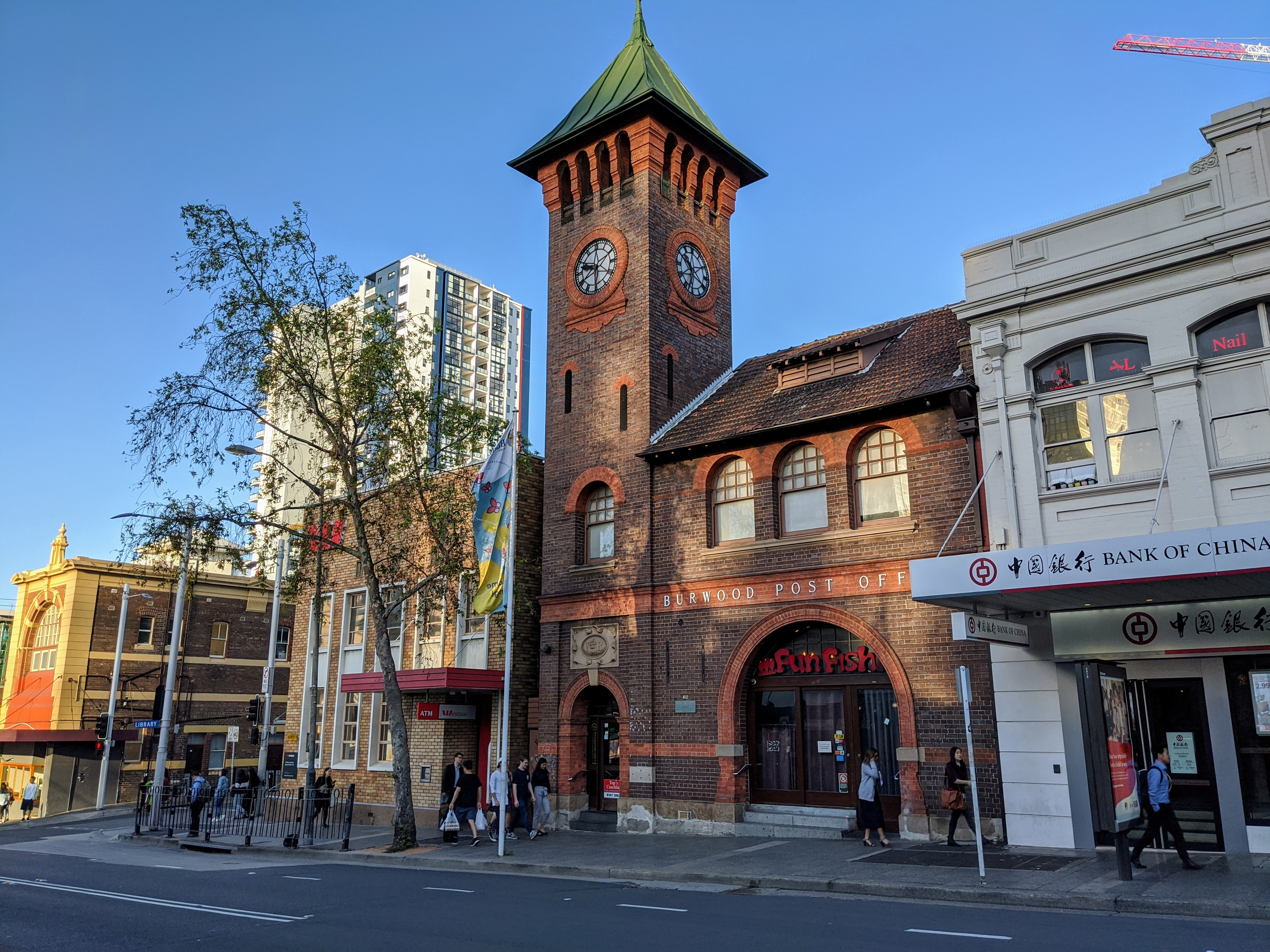
- Burwood Road and part of the heritage-listed Burwood Post Office, designed by Walter Liberty Vernon.

- Interactive map of Burwood
- Country: Australia
- State: New South Wales
- City: Sydney
- LGA: Municipality of Burwood
- Location: 12 km (7.5 mi) west of Sydney CBD
- Established: 1814

Government
  - State electorate: Strathfield
  - Federal division: Reid

Area
  - Total: 2 km^{2} (0.77 sq mi)
- Elevation: 30 m (98 ft)

Population
  - Total: 18,224 (2021 census)
  - Density: 9,100/km^{2} (24,000/sq mi)
- Postcode: 2134
Suburbs around Burwood
Concord	Canada Bay	Five Dock
Strathfield	Burwood	Croydon
Strathfield South	Burwood Heights	Croydon Park

Burwood is a suburb in the Inner West of Sydney, in the state of New South Wales, Australia. It is 12 kilometres (7.5 mi) west of the Sydney central business district and is the administrative centre for the local government area of Municipality of Burwood.

Burwood Heights is a separate suburb to the south. The Appian Way is a street in Burwood, known for its architecturally designed Federation-style homes.

== History ==
Archaeological evidence indicates people were living in the Sydney area for at least 11,000 years. This long association had led to a harmonious relationship between the indigenous inhabitants and their environment, which was interrupted by the arrival of the British in 1788. The European desire to cultivate the land aided and abetted by a smallpox epidemic that forced the local people, the Wangal clan, away from their source of food and their spiritual connection with the land.

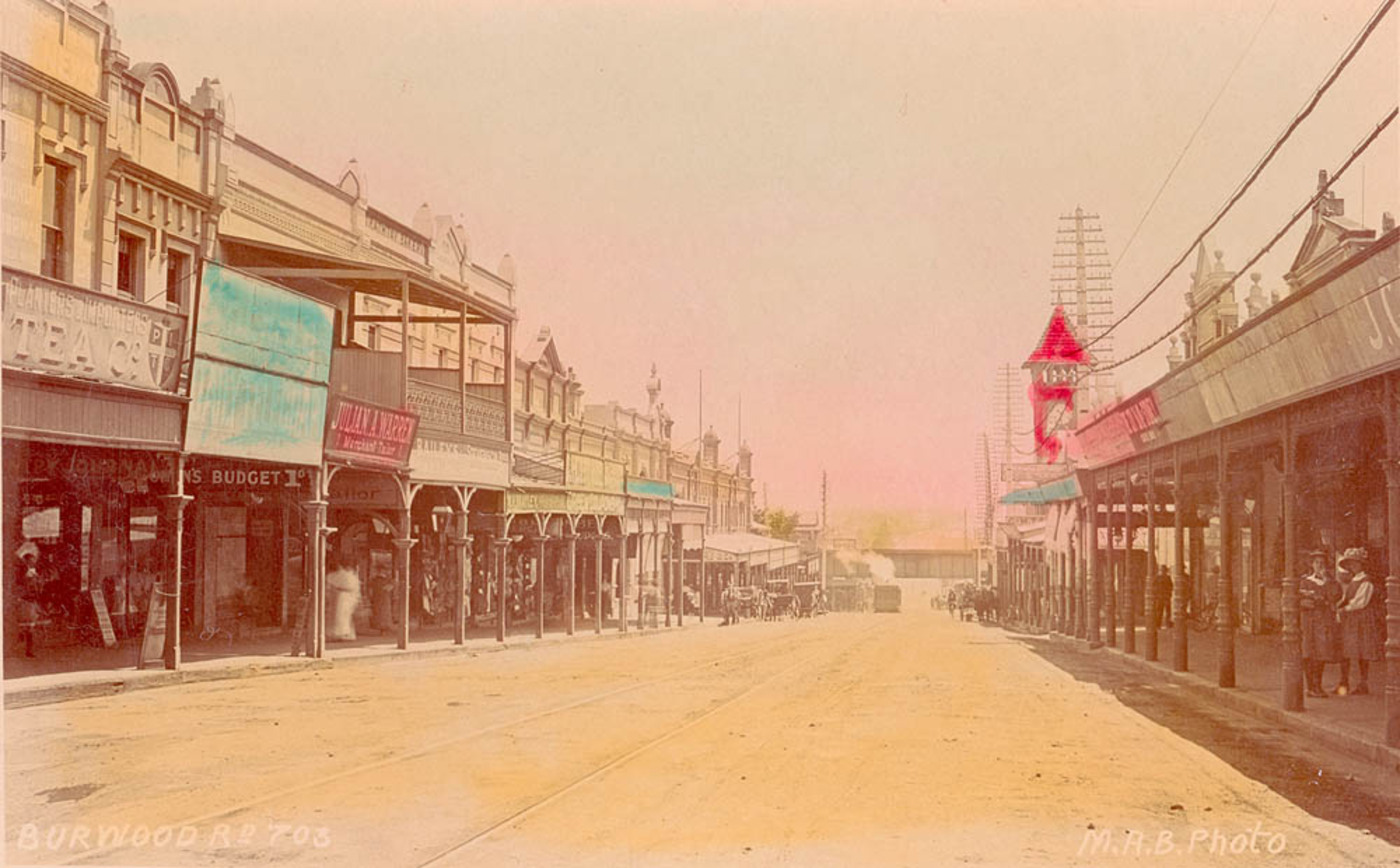
Historical view of Burwood Road

Captain Thomas Rowley (1748–1806) received a grant of 260 acres (110 ha) in 1799, and called his property Burwood Farm after Burwood Park, England. Following more land grants, his estate increased to 750 acres (300 ha). The grant stretched from Parramatta Road to where Nicholson Street and The Boulevarde are today and eastwards where to Croydon railway station is now. This is where he ran merino sheep on the property.

The first house, Burwood Villa, was built in the area in 1814, the same year that a stagecoach began running between Sydney and Parramatta. Burwood became a staging post along the road and the beginnings of a settlement started to develop. One of its most prominent early residents was Dr. John Dulhunty, a former naval surgeon who was appointed the Superintendent of Police for the Colony of New South Wales after his arrival in Sydney from England in 1826. Dr. Dulhunty became famous in the colony for fighting a gang of bushrangers that attacked his residence, Burwood House. He died suddenly in the house in 1828 but his son, Robert Dulhunty, went on to become the founder of the New South Wales regional city of Dubbo.

Subdivisions in the Burwood area in the 1830s propelled the growth of a village and by 1855, when the railway line opened, Burwood was one of the initial six stops on the Sydney-to-Parramatta route. The railway led to a huge growth in population. In 1874, the area became a municipality.

Burwood was ranked 16th coolest suburb in the world by Time Out.

== Landmarks ==
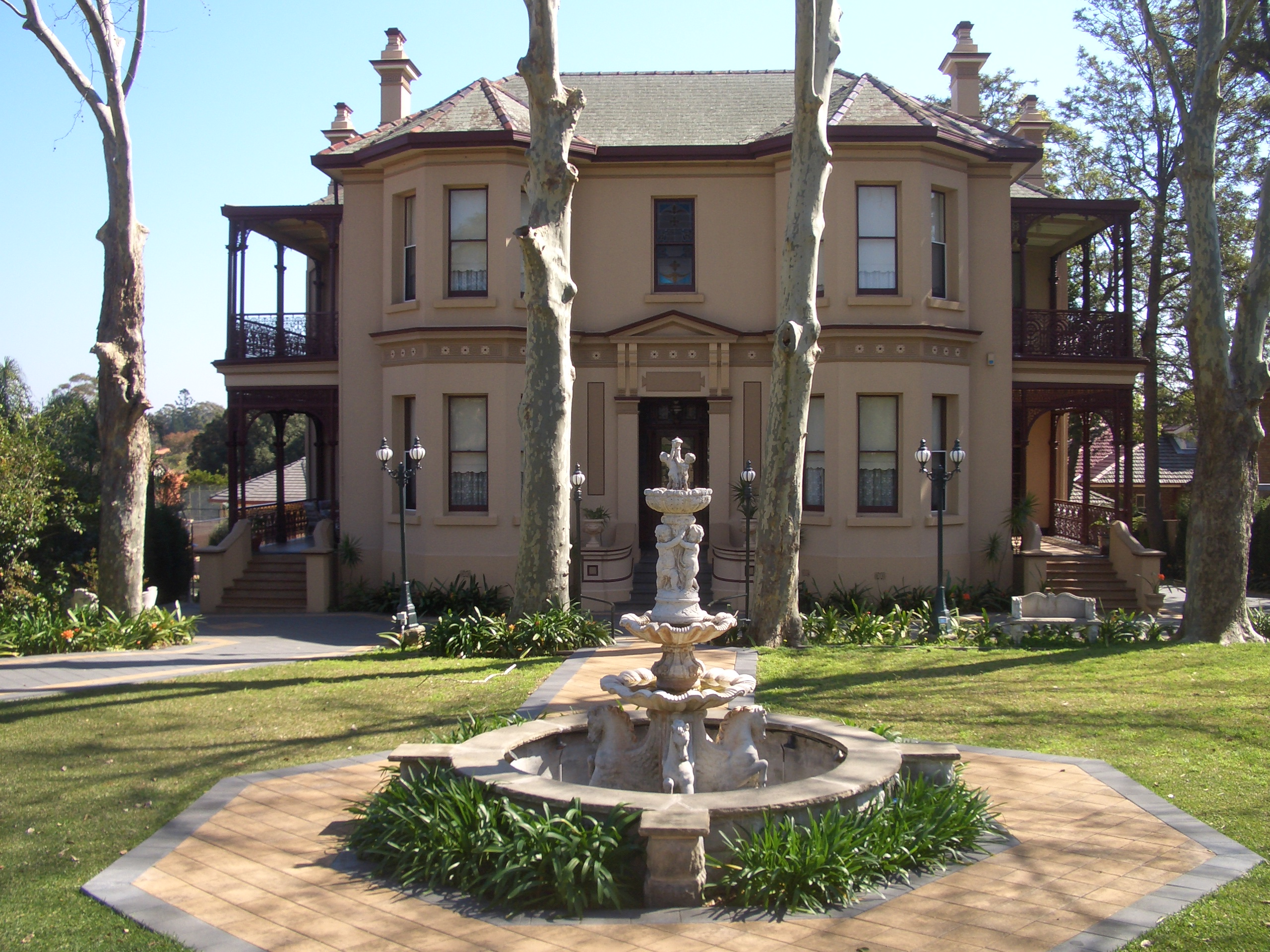
Gayton the home of Richard Jones MLC on Burwood Road, Burwood.

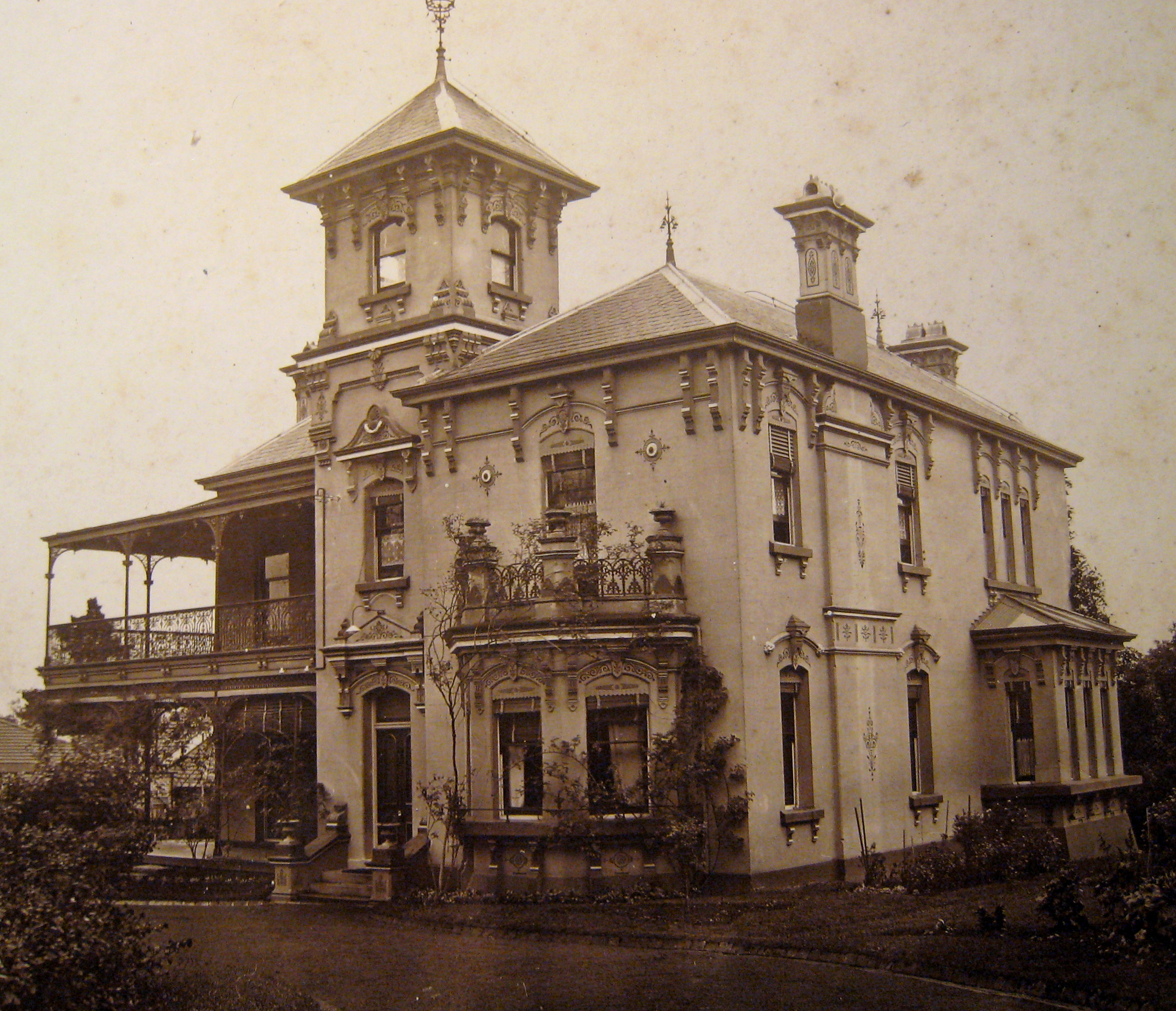
The Priory, Burwood Road

Burwood features many fine examples of architecture from the Victorian and Federation styles. St Paul's Anglican Church on Burwood Road was designed by colonial architect Edmund Blacket and built in 1871. Sir Donald Bradman and Lady Bradman, Jessie Menzies were married here in 1932. The church and its pipe organ is listed on the New South Wales State Heritage Register and on the (now defunct) Register of the National Estate.

Nearby Woodstock in Church Street was built in the early 1870s by tobacco manufacturer Edwin Penfold. In the 1940s, it was taken over by the army, later becoming Broughton Migrant Hostel, before being bought by the council in 1974 for use as a community centre. Radio station 2RDJ-FM has been broadcasting from Woodstock since November 1983.

Further south on Burwood Road is The Priory, built in 1877 by local councillor Mowbray Forrest, and Gayton, built in 1888 by NSW parliamentarian Richard Jones. St Nectarios Greek Orthodox Church in Railway Parade was formerly a Methodist church and was built in 1879, listed on the local government heritage list.

Running between Burwood Road and Liverpool Road is The Appian Way, a model housing estate conceived by George Hoskins at the turn of the century. The street has been described as one of the finest streets of Federation houses in Australia and is listed on the local government heritage list. In the centre of the Appian Way is a communal reserve which was converted into a lawn tennis club.

== Heritage listings ==
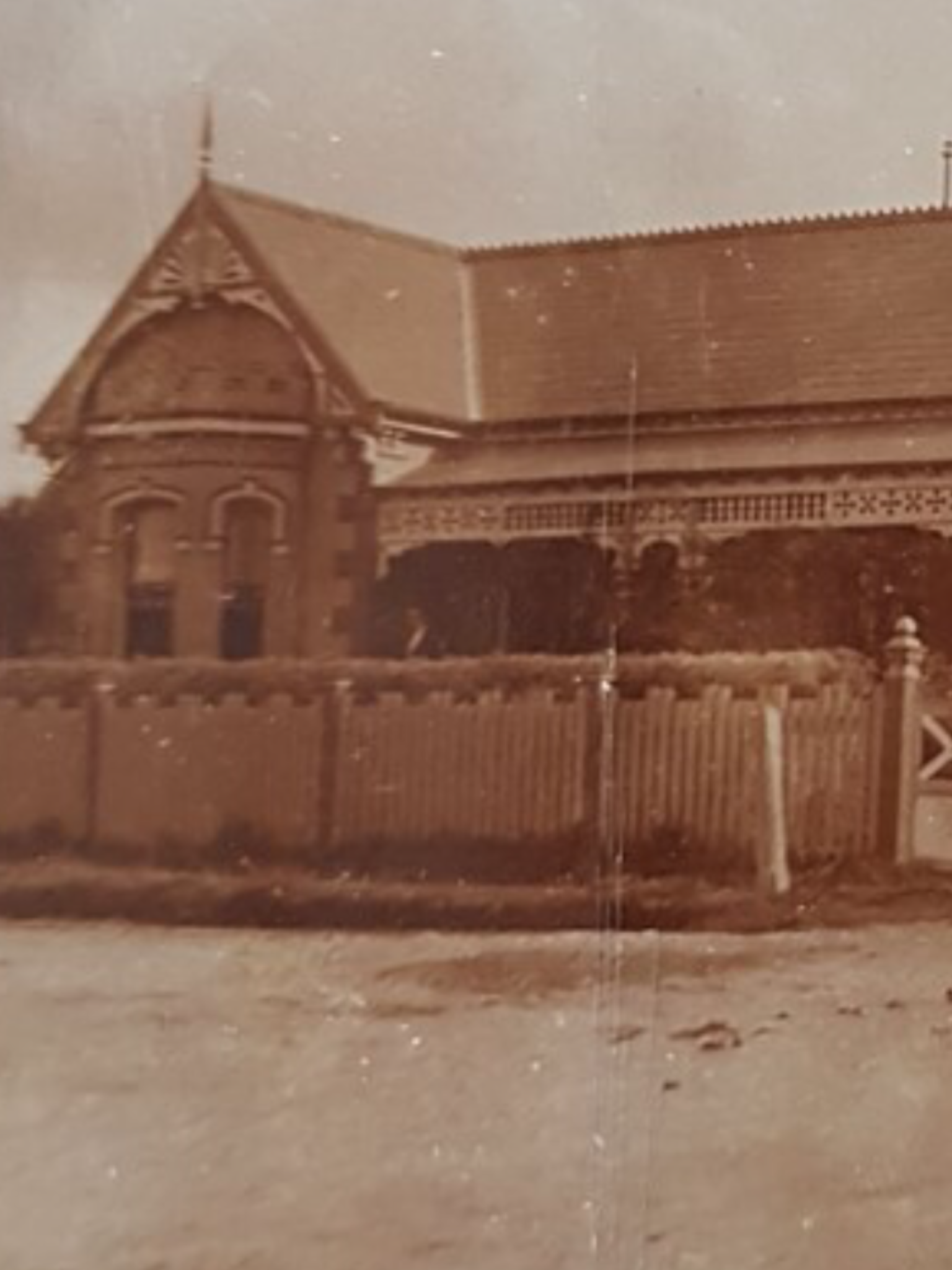
Twickenham, the remarkably intact Victorian Italianate villa of the Daly family still stands on Carilla Street, Burwood.

Burwood has a number of heritage-listed sites, including the following sites listed on the New South Wales State Heritage Register:

- 168a Burwood Road: Burwood Post Office
- 205 Burwood Road: St Paul's Anglican Church, Burwood
- 213 Burwood Road: The Priory
- 223 Burwood Road: St Cloud
- 4 Clarence Street: Lynton
- Great Southern and Western railway: Burwood rail underbridge
- Great Southern and Western railway: Burwood railway station, Sydney
- Railway Parade: Burwood Sewer Vent

The following buildings are listed on the (now defunct) Register of the National Estate and/or local government heritage registers:

- Congregational Church, Burwood Road
- Gayton (1888), Burwood Road,
- Deolee, Burwood Road
- Methodist Ladies College, Rowley Street
- Woodstock, Church Street
- St Nectarios Greek Orthodox Church, Railway Parade

== Burwood Park ==
Burwood Park was established by the local council in 1882 on land formerly known as Edrop's Paddock. The original design of the park was based on the Union Jack flag, although it was later modified to allow a cricket oval to be established at the western edge of the park. Other features of Burwood Park include memorials to soldiers who died in World War I and Sandakan, a rotunda, a playground, a lake and an obelisk commemorating the site of Burwood Villa, the area's first house. It is also the location for Carols in the Park each Christmas. Burwood Park is located on Burwood Road opposite Westfield Burwood.

== Demographics ==
In the 2021 census, there were 18,224 residents in the suburb of Burwood, a significant increase from 16,030 in 2016 and 12,466 in 2011. The most common reported ancestries in Burwood were Chinese 48.3%, English 8.6%, Nepali 7.9%, Australian 5.5% and Vietnamese 3.3%. 25.1% of the residents were born in Australia. The most common other countries of birth were mainland China 28.8%, Nepal 8.2%, Vietnam 3.3%, Malaysia 3.1% and Hong Kong 2.8%. In Burwood, 19.8% of people only spoke English at home. Other languages spoken at home included Mandarin 32.1%, Cantonese 10.8%, Nepali 7.9%, Vietnamese 2.9% and Korean 2.4%. The most common responses for religion in Burwood were No Religion 43.4%, Catholic 13.2%, Buddhism 11.2%, Hinduism 10.1% and Not stated 7.6%.

== Commercial area ==
Burwood Park
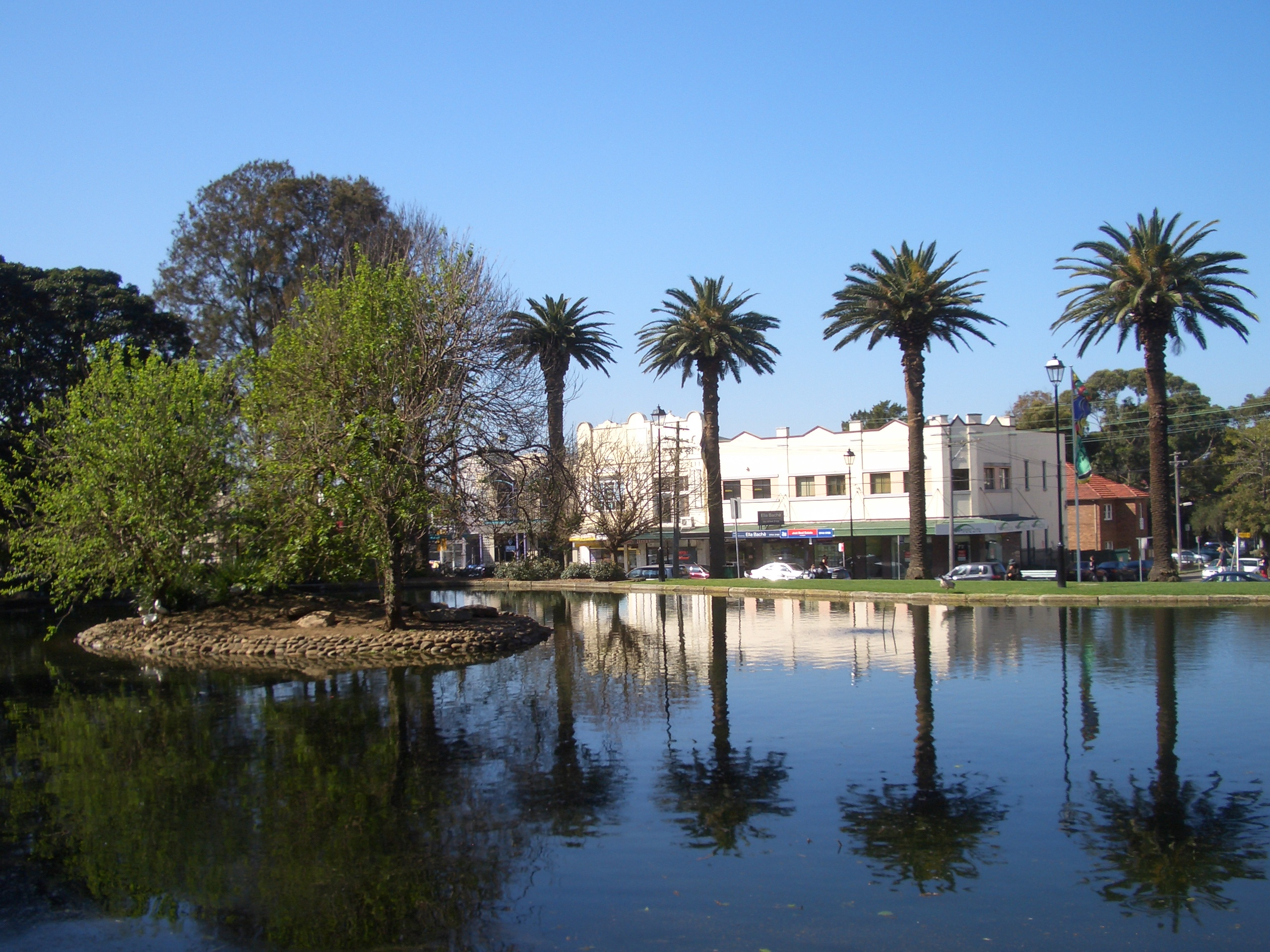
- Lake in Burwood Park

- Location within Sydney
- Type: Urban park
- Location: Burwood, Burwood Council, Sydney, New South Wales, Australia
- Coordinates: 33°52′22″S 151°06′10″E
- Created: 1882
- Operator: Burwood Council
- Open: 24 hours
- Status: Open all year

Burwood has a mixture of residential, commercial, and light industrial developments. The main shopping strip runs along Burwood Road, beside Burwood railway station. Westfield Burwood is a large regional shopping centre, north of the railway line, on Burwood Road opposite Burwood Park. Burwood Plaza is a smaller shopping centre on Railway Parade, south of the railway line. "Burwood Chinatown" (traditional Chinese: 寶活中國城; simplified Chinese: 宝活中国城; Cantonese Yale: Bóuwuht Jūnggwoksìng; pinyin: Bǎohuó Zhōngguóchéng) is an arcade connecting Burwood Plaza to Burwood Road, formerly named Murray Arcade.

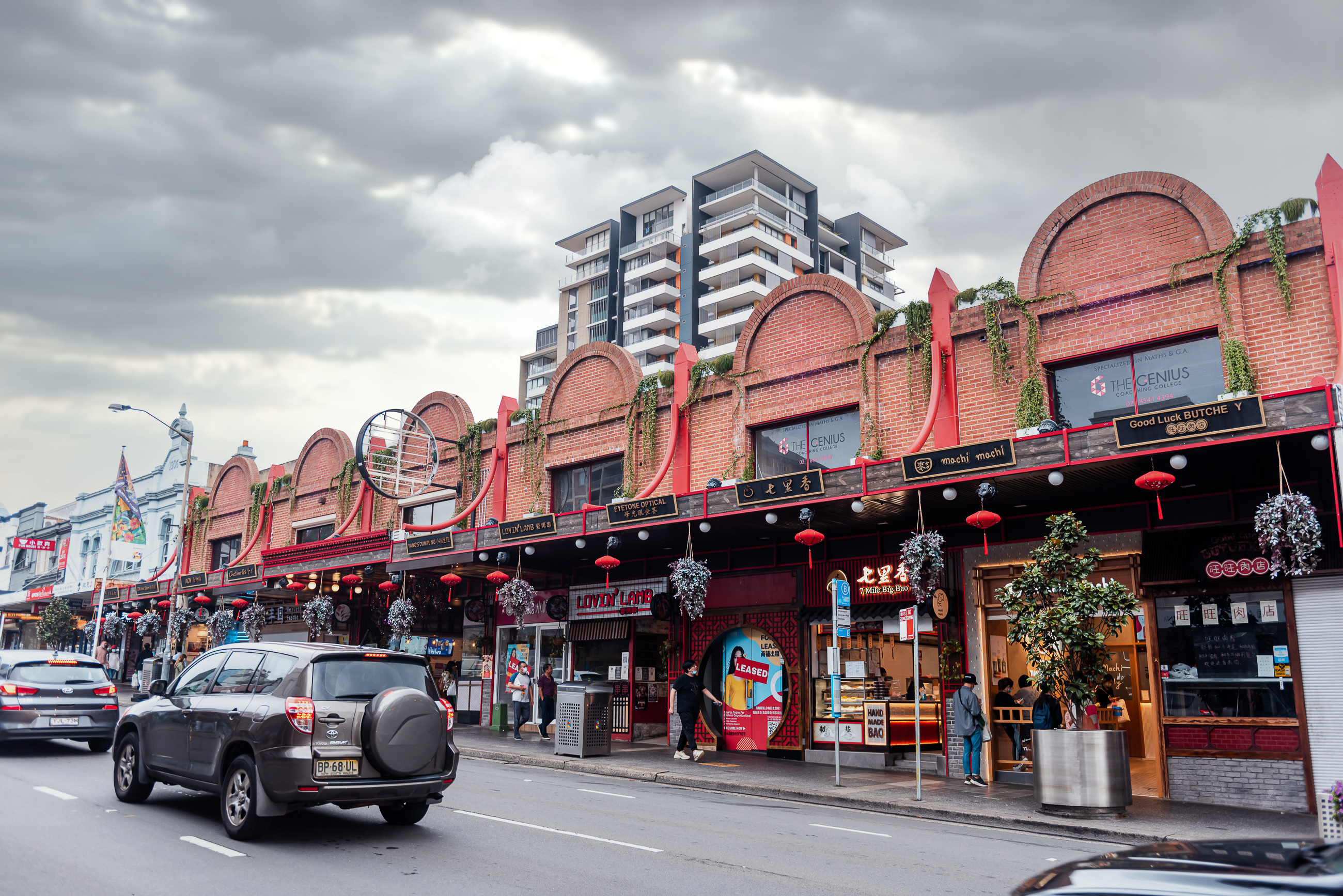
Burwood Chinatown's Burwood Road main entrance

High rise residential and commercial buildings are also found in surrounding streets and along the railway line. Commercial and light industrial developments are located along Parramatta Road.

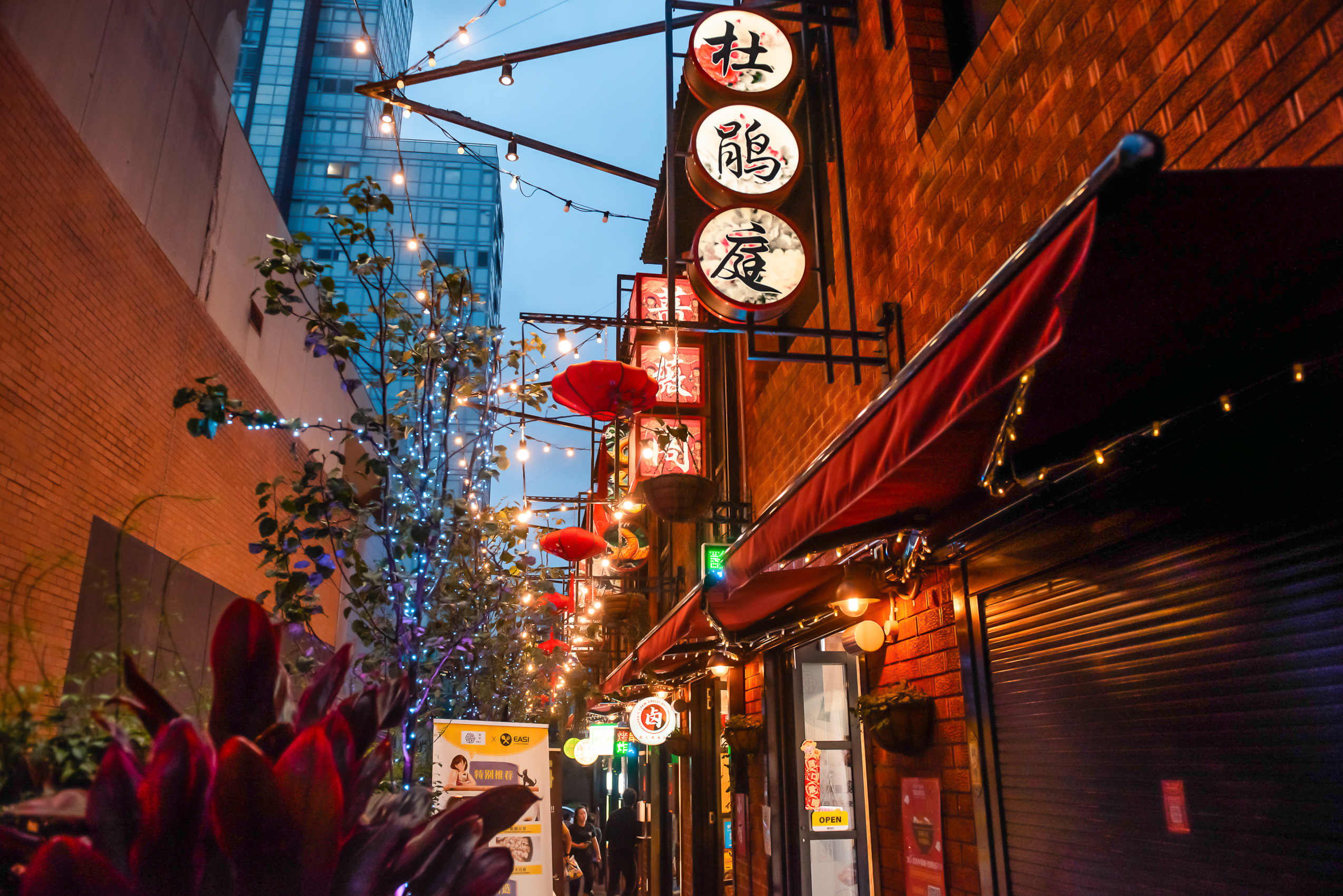
Burwood Chinatown Laneway located on Clarendon Place

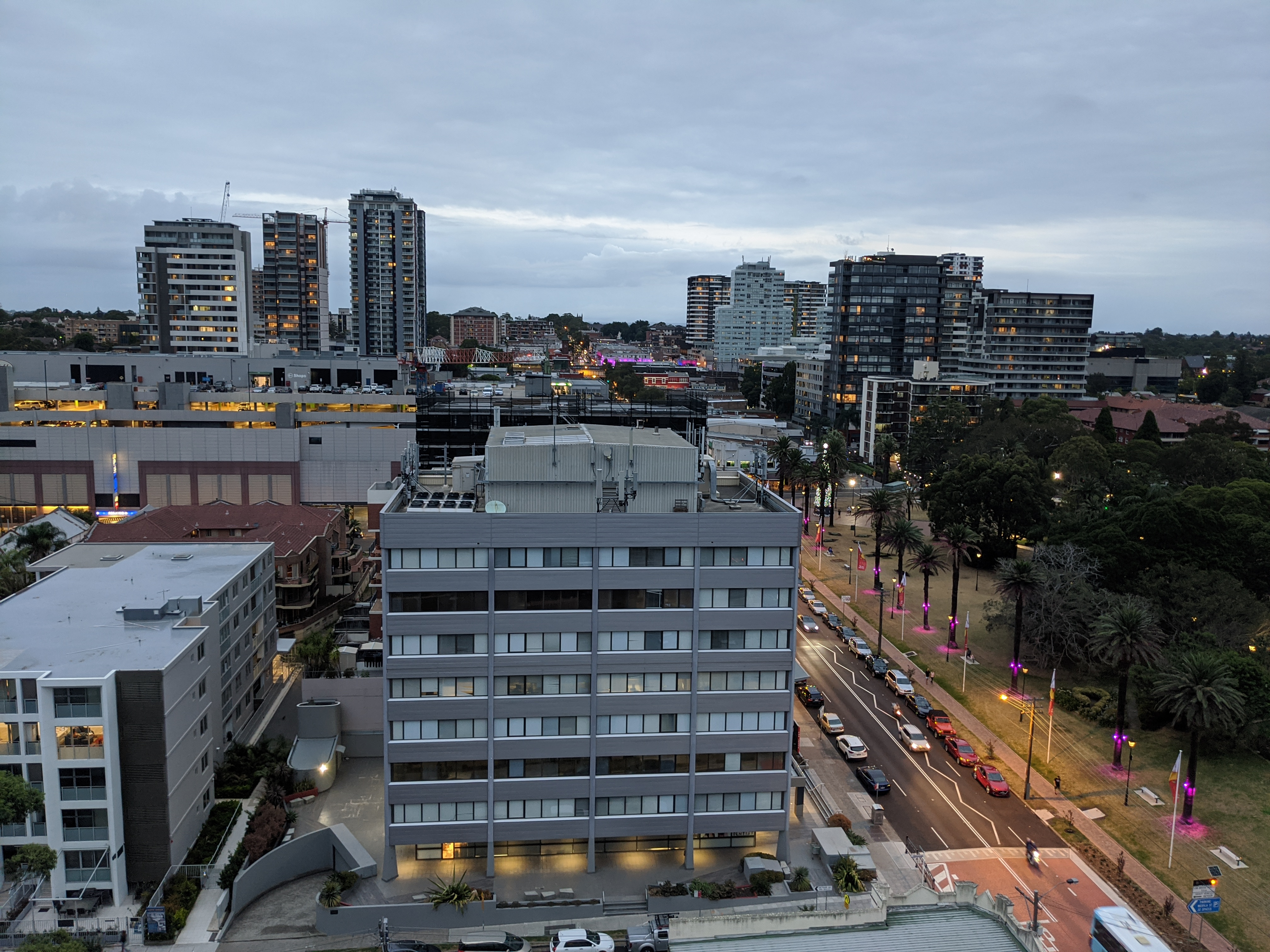
Burwood skyline

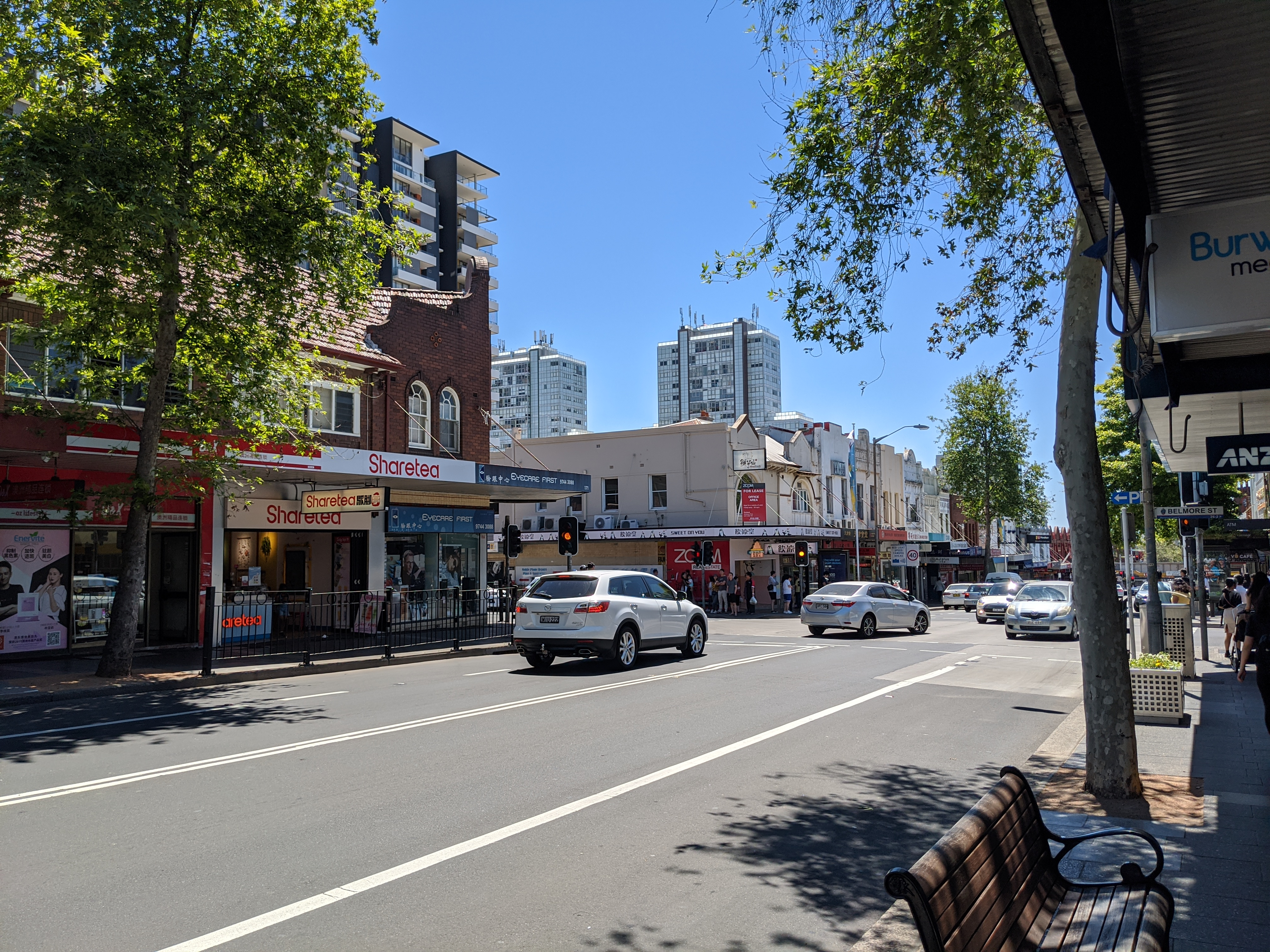
Shops along the busy Burwood Road

== Transport ==
Burwood has excellent access to public transport and Burwood railway station is on the T9 Northern, T2 Leppington & Inner West and T3 Liverpool & Inner West lines of the Sydney Trains network.

Trams to Mortlake and Cabarita once travelled down Burwood Road; trams ceased in August 1948.

Transit Systems provide many bus services to Burwood, from Hurstville, Rockdale, Mascot, Kingsford, Strathfield, Homebush, Campsie, Ryde, Bankstown, Liverpool as well as other locations across Sydney. There are two terminuses, Burwood station and Westfield Burwood. Transit Systems' Burwood Bus Depot is located on the corner of Shaftesbury and Parramatta Roads.

Burwood North is a future rapid transit station to be built as part of the Sydney Metro West project.

== Residents ==
The following were either born or have lived in the suburb of Burwood

- Dave Barsley − rugby league player
- Arthur Cuthbertson – Ice hockey player, born in Burwood
- Eleanor Dark – novelist, born in Burwood
- Clare Dennis – swimmer, born in Burwood
- Sir Norman McAlister Gregg – ophthalmologist, born in Burwood
- Norman Hetherington – cartoonist, grew up at 35 Meryla Street Burwood
- Miriam Hyde – composer and pianist, born and lived in Burwood
- Richard Jones MLC – lived at Gayton in Burwood Road
- Robert Kaleski – writer, environmentalist, and dog breeder influential, born in Burwood
- Richard Makinson - physicist, was born in Burwood
- William McMahon – 20th Prime Minister of Australia, lived in Burwood
- William MacDonald – serial killer, lived in a store in Burwood
- Earle Page – 11th Prime Minister of Australia, lived in Burwood
- George Reid – 4th Prime Minister of Australia, lived in Burwood
- Arthur Renwick – physician, philanthropist and politician
- Doug Sutherland – former lord mayor of Sydney
- John Manning Ward – historian and vice chancellor, born in Burwood
- Charles Smith Wilkinson – spent his last days in Burwood
- Angus, George and Malcolm Young – musicians, grew up in Burwood

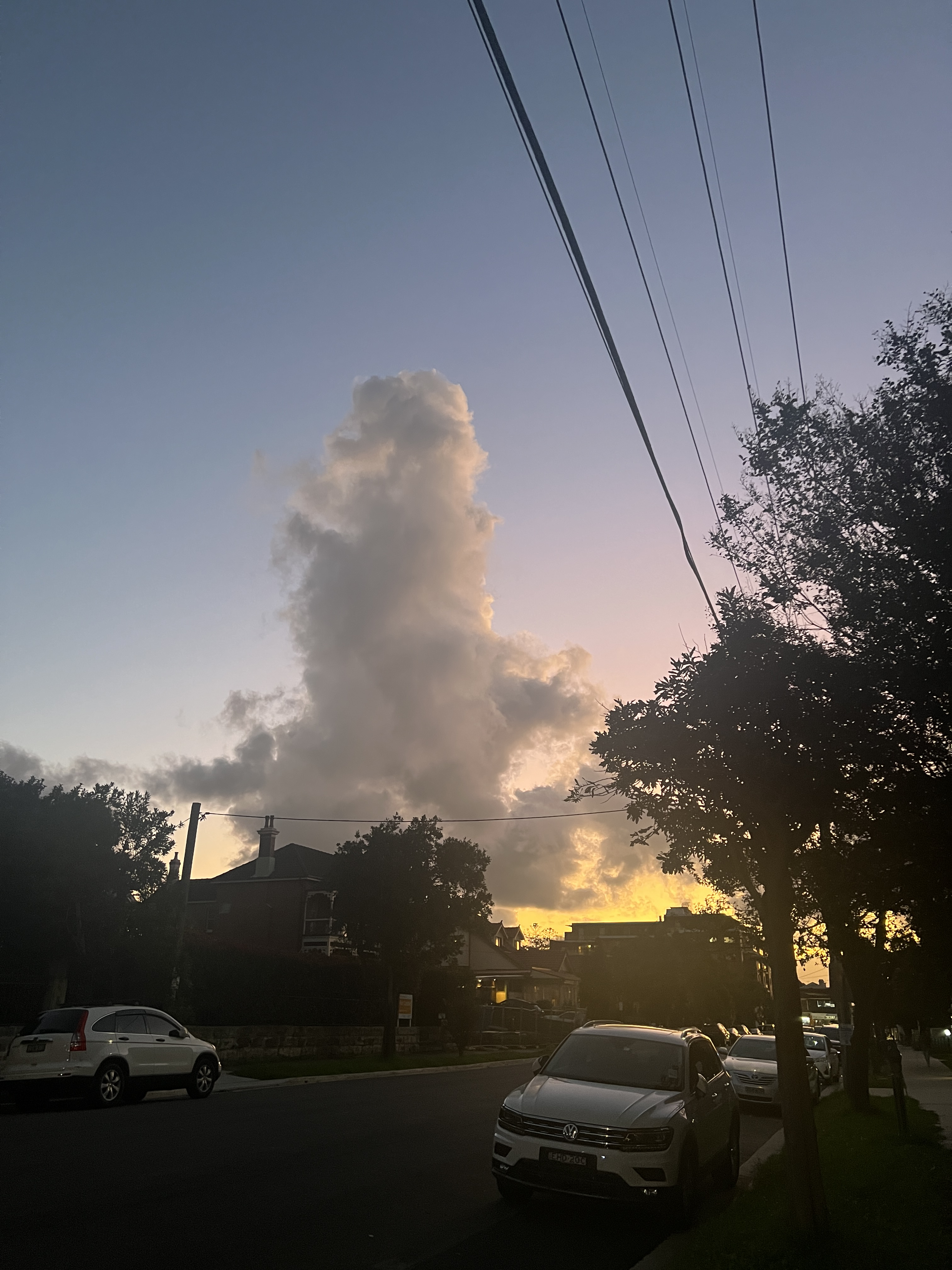
The sunset in Burwood seen after a day's work

== Sister cities ==
Burwood currently has five sister cities:

- Tianjin, China
- Calabria, Italy
- Imar, Lebanon
- Sandakan, Malaysia
- Utica, New York, United States of America
- Geumcheon, South Korea

== Gallery ==
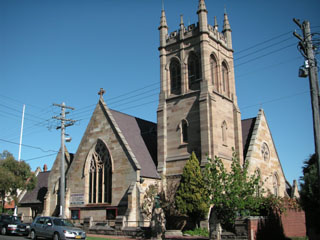
St Paul's Anglican Church, Burwood Road

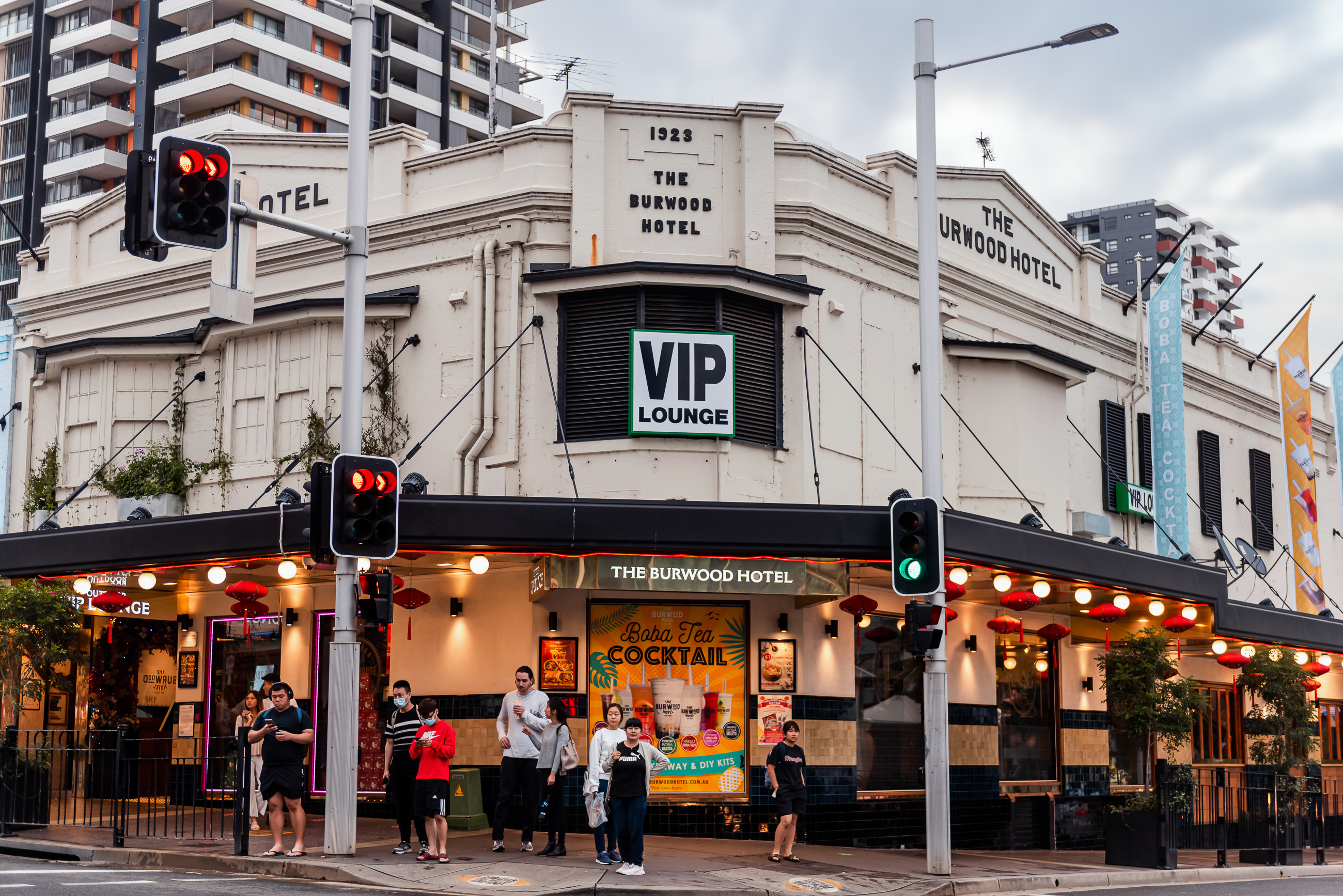
The Burwood Hotel, Burwood Road

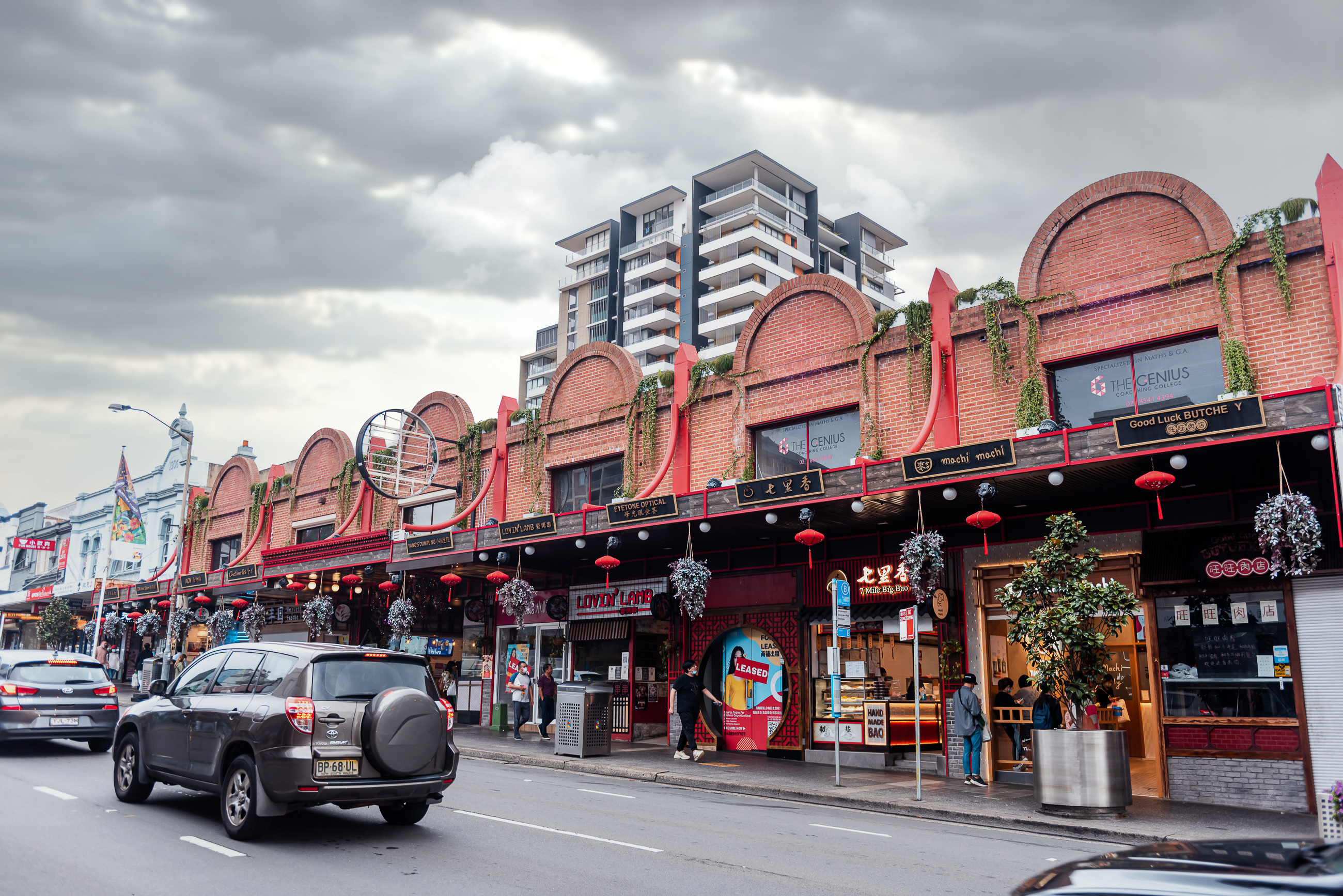
Burwood Chinatown, Burwood Road

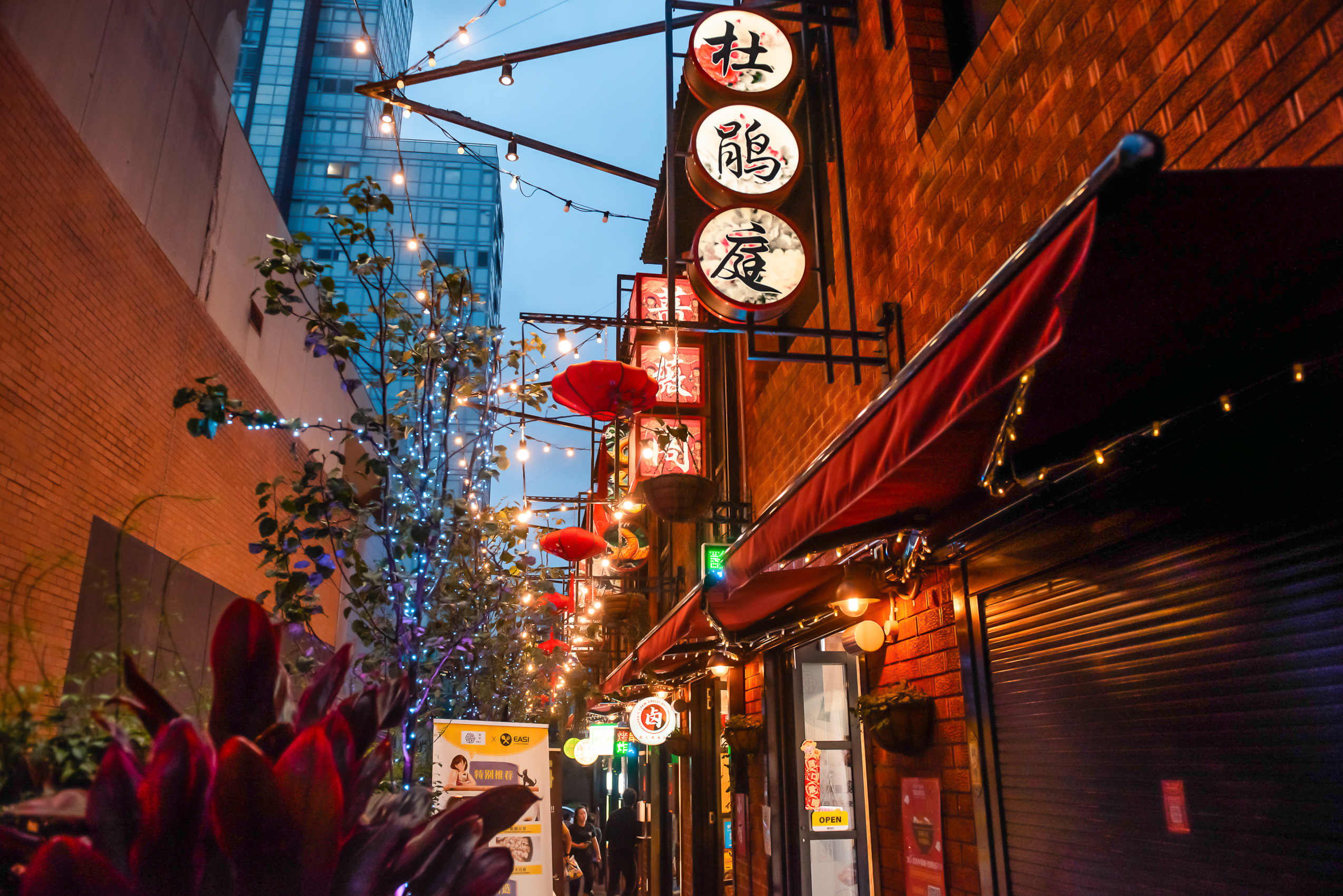
Burwood Chinatown Laneway, Clarendon Place

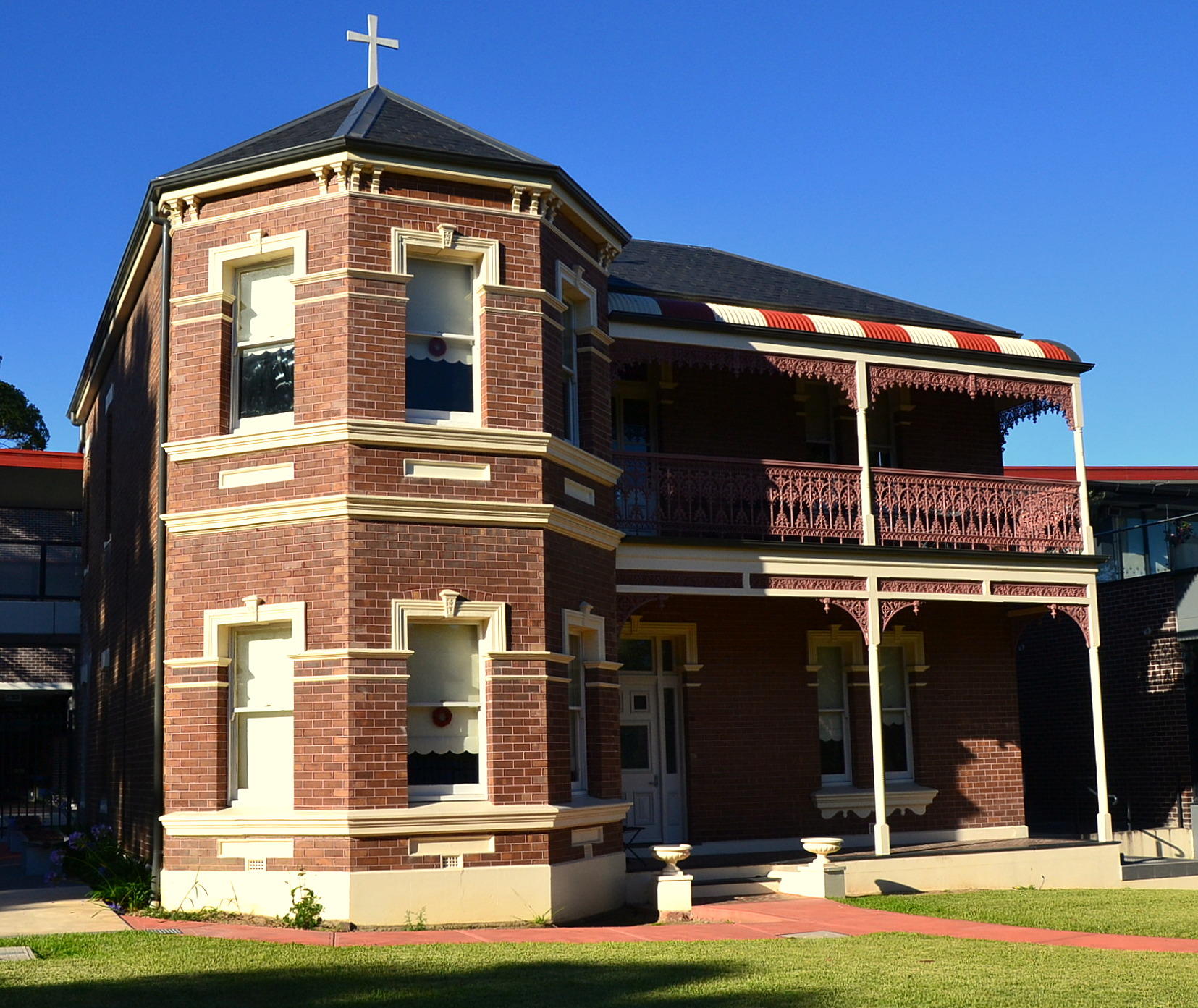
Southern Cross Catholic Vocational College, Comer Street

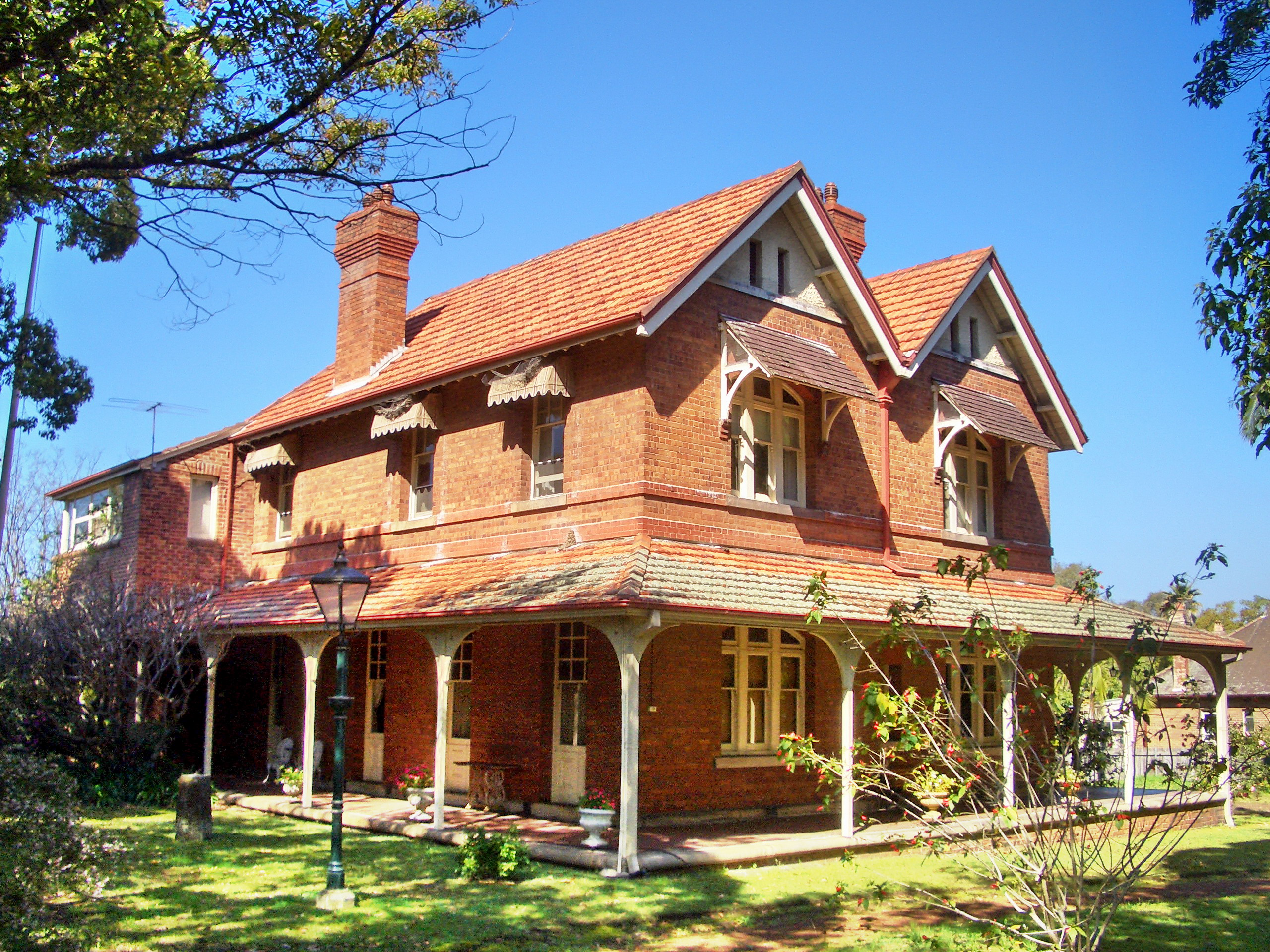
Deolee (c. 1891), Burwood Road

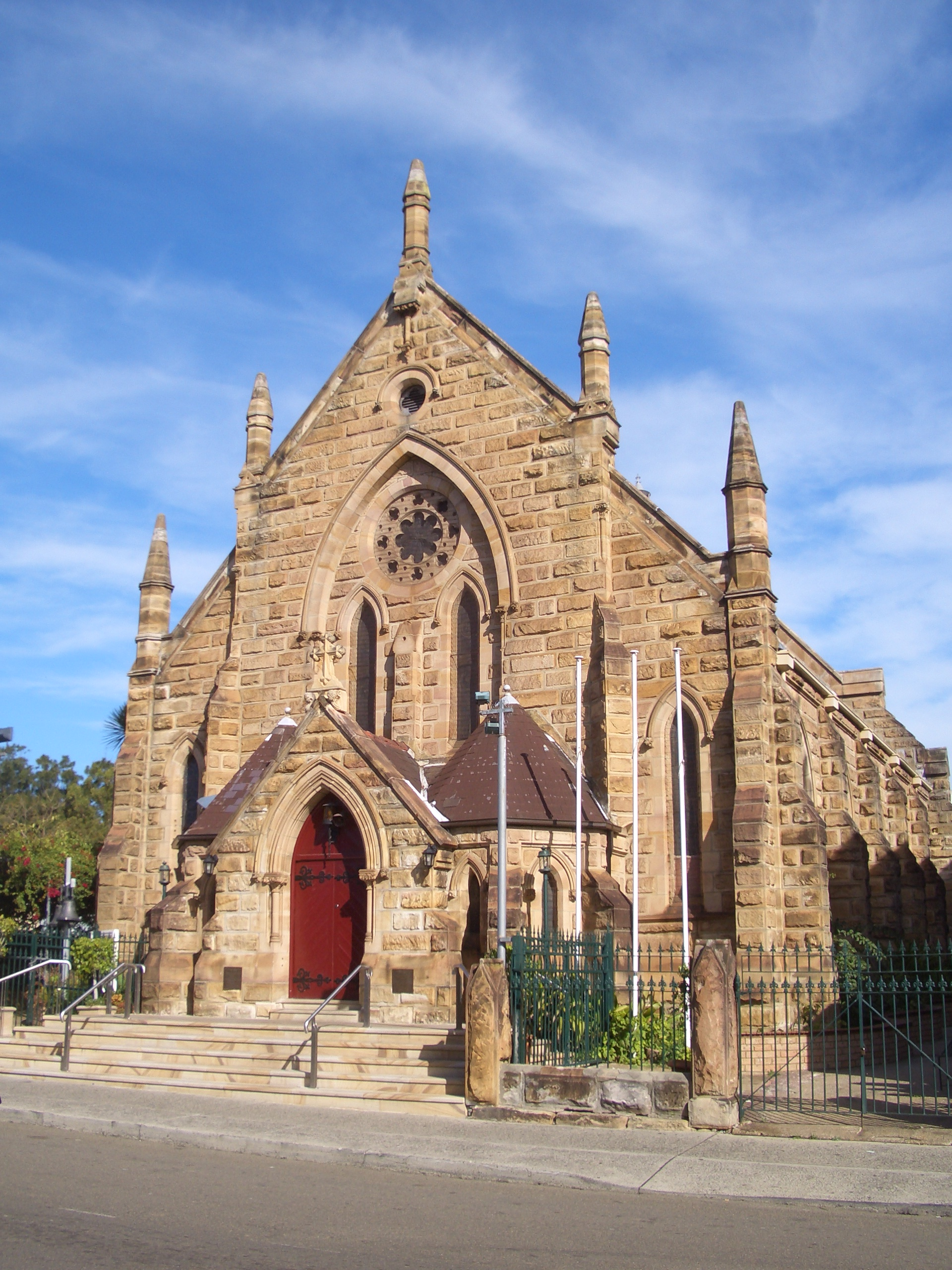
St Nectarios Greek Orthodox Church, Railway Parade

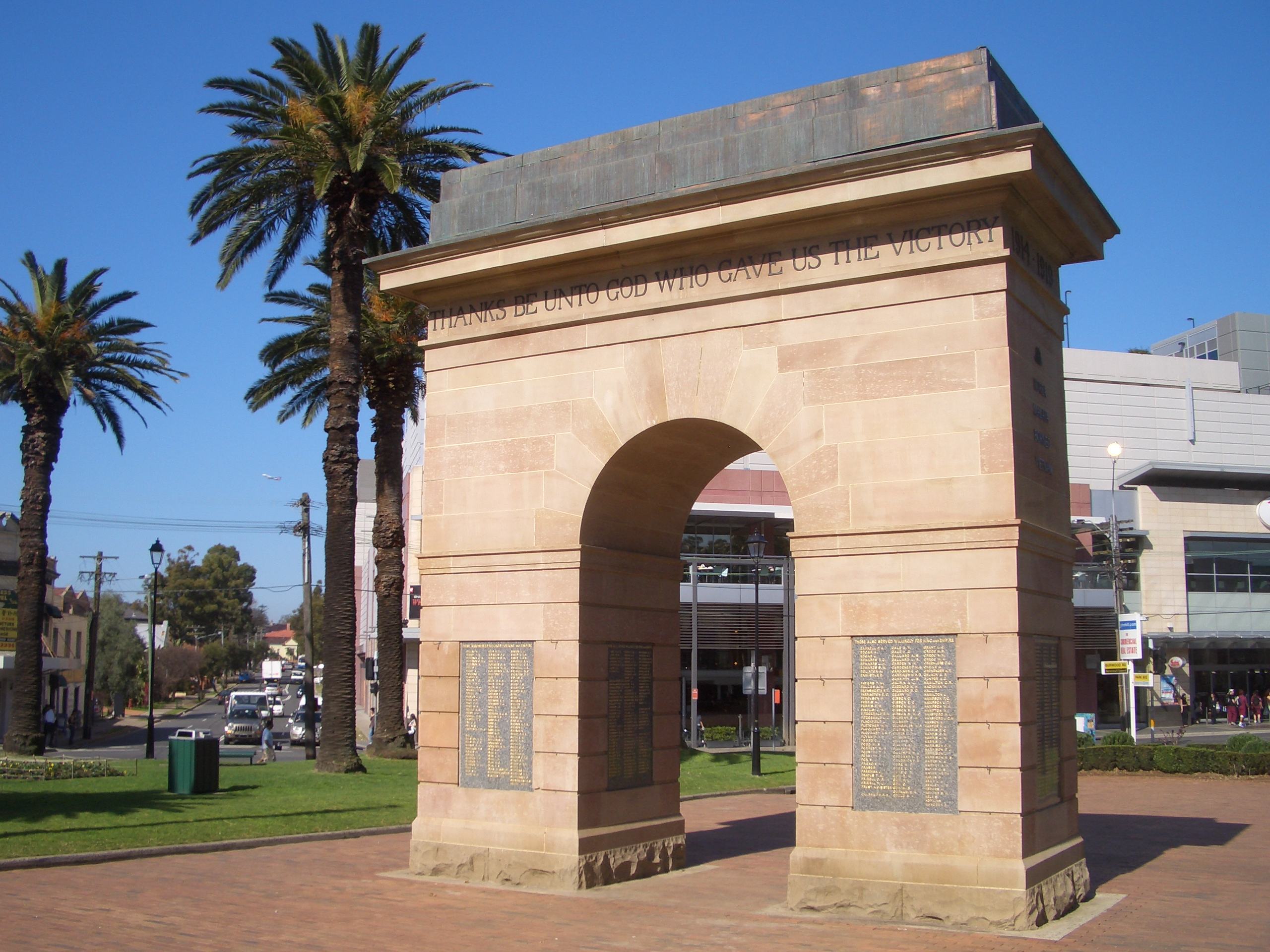
War Memorial in Burwood Park

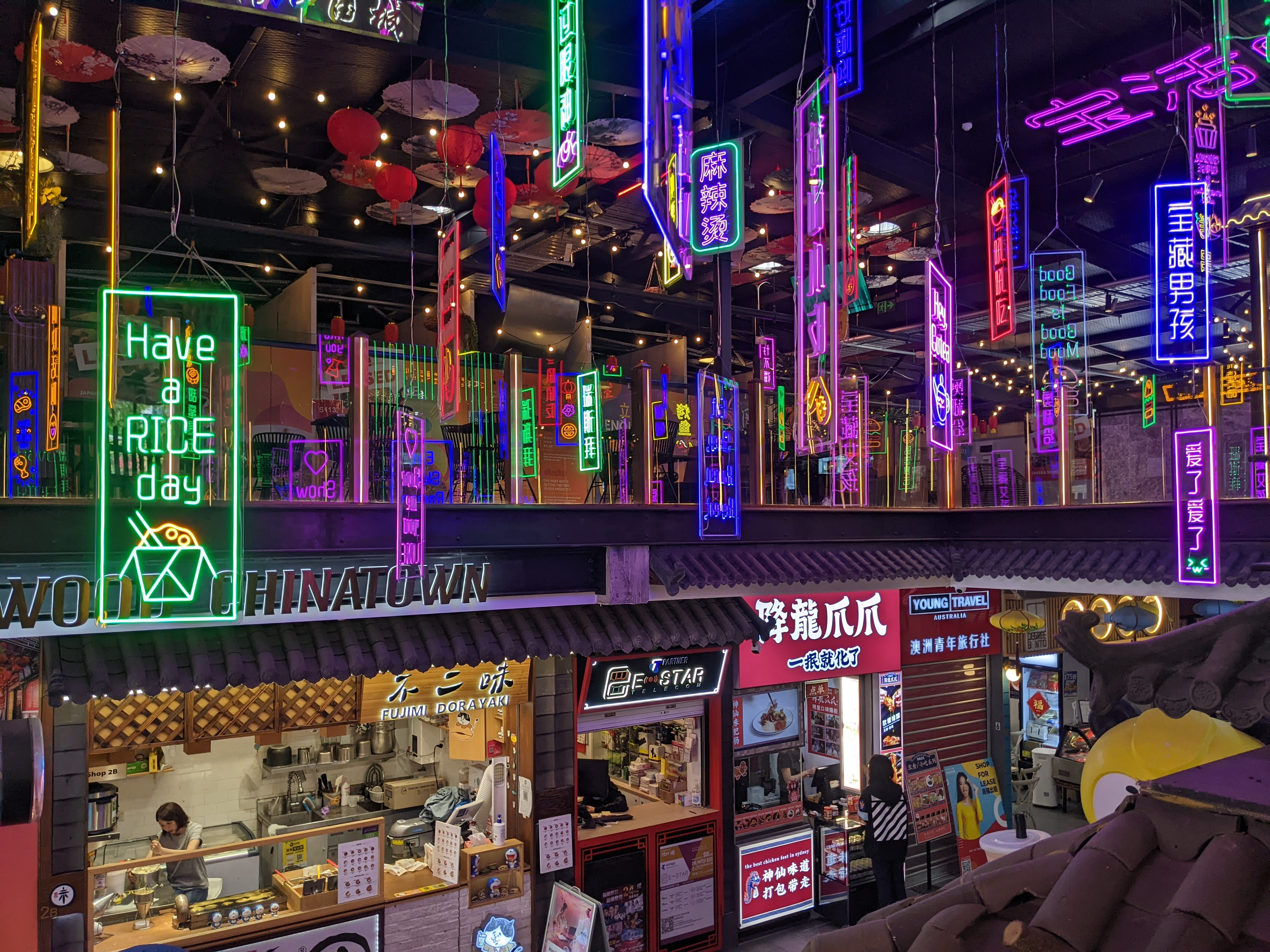
Burwood Chinatown

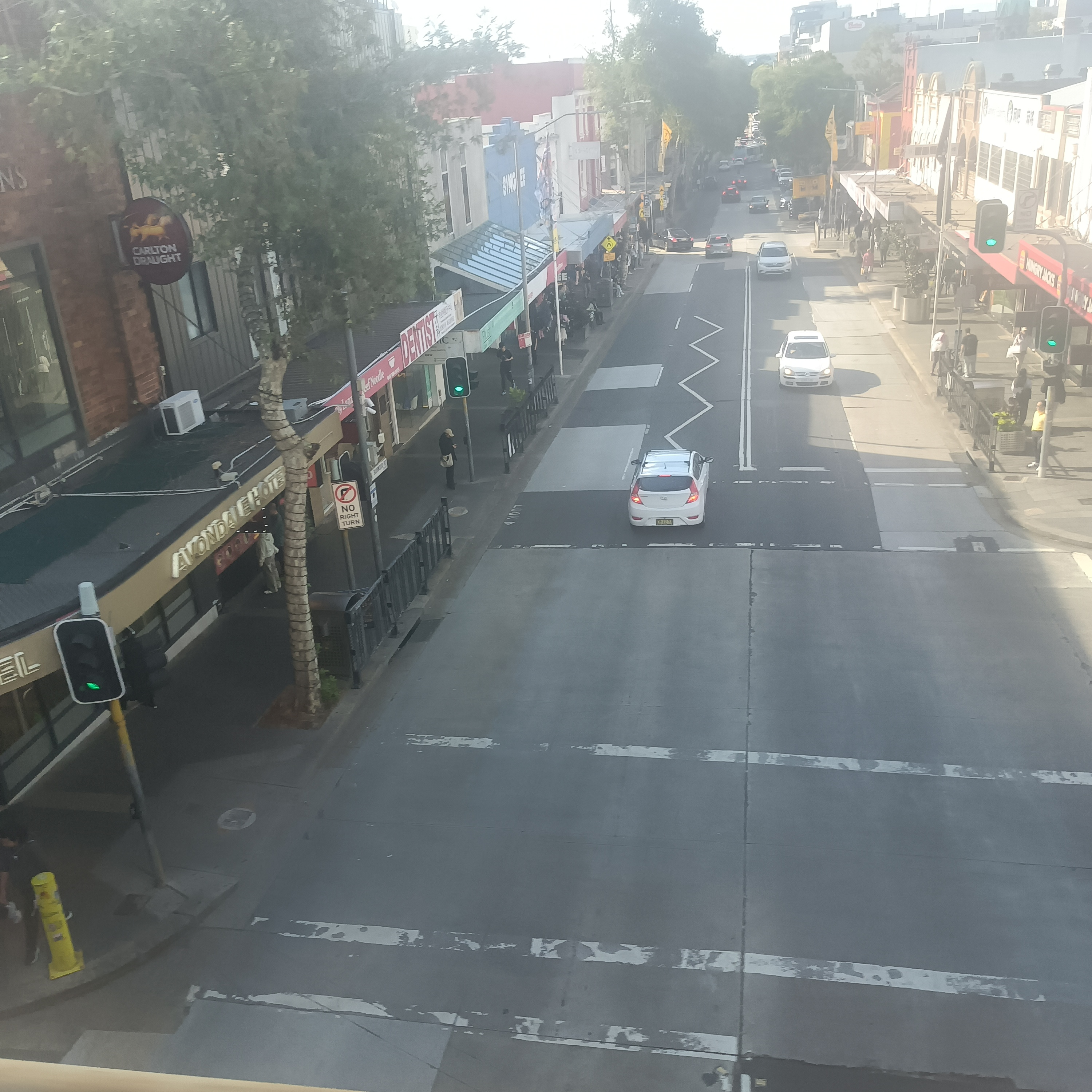
View from the railway bridge looking down onto Burwood Rd, Burwood. 2026
