= Burwood Post Office =

Burwood Post Office (former)
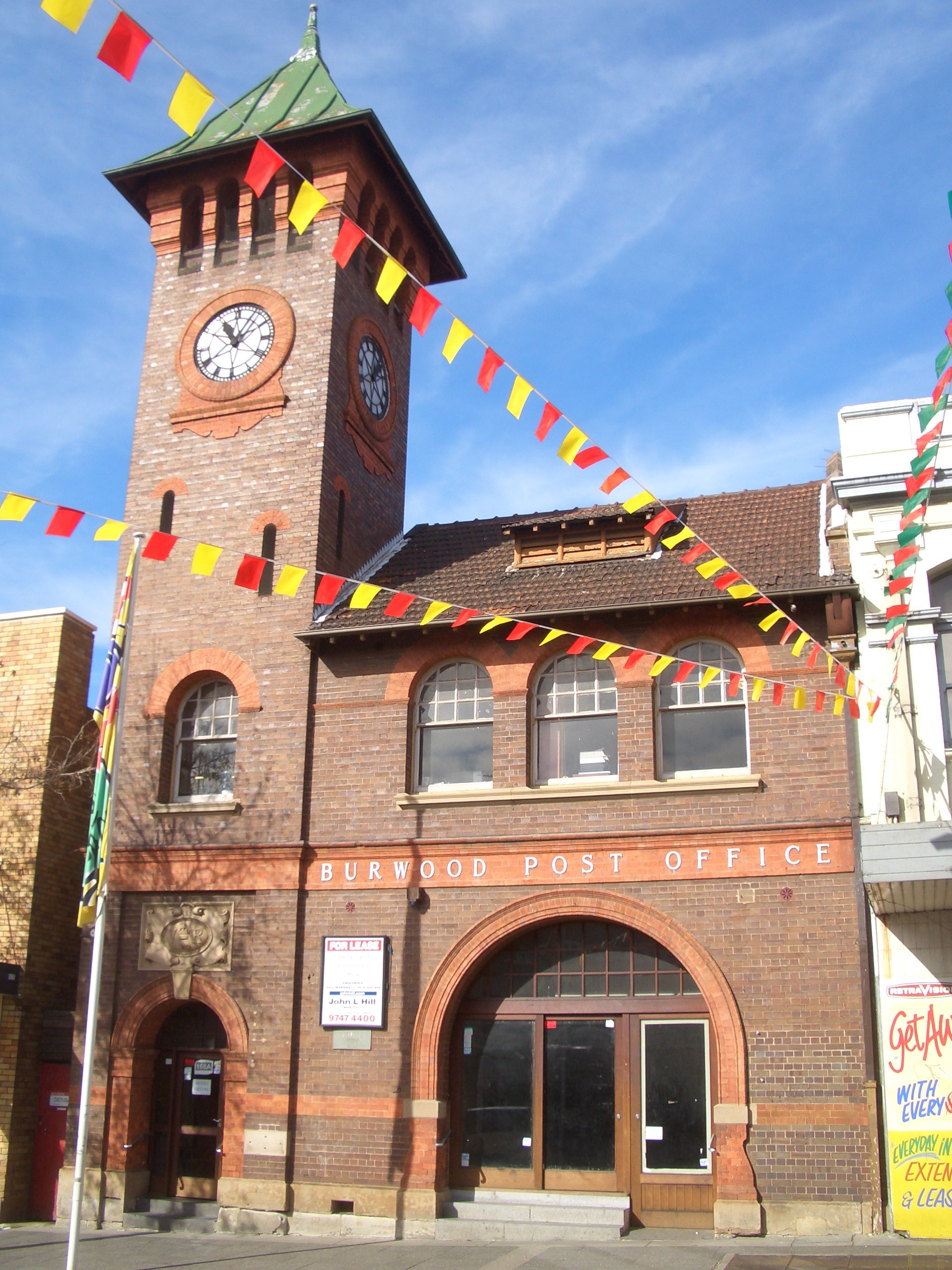
- The former post office, pictured in 2007

- Location within Sydney Location within Australia
- 33°52′40″S 151°06′14″E
- Location: 168a Burwood Road, Burwood, Municipality of Burwood, New South Wales, Australia

History
- Built: 1892

Site notes
- Architects: Walter Liberty Vernon; George Oakeshott (assistant draughtsman)
- Architectural style: Italian Romanesque Revival

New South Wales Heritage Register
- Official name: Burwood Post Office (former)
- Type: State heritage (built)
- Designated: 18 May 2001
- Reference no.: 1490
- Type: Post Office
- Category: Postal and Telecommunications
- Builders: New South Wales Works Branch

The Burwood Post Office is a heritage-listed former Aboriginal land, farm and former post office and now retail building located at 168a Burwood Road in the Sydney suburb of Burwood, New South Wales, Australia. It was designed by Walter Liberty Vernon and George Oakeshott (assistant draughtsman) and built by New South Wales Works Branch. It is also known as Burwood Post Office (former). It was added to the New South Wales State Heritage Register on 18 May 2001.

== History ==
=== Burwood ===
Burwood derived its name from a grant of 250 acres made by Governor Hunter on 3 August 1799 to Captain Thomas Rowley of the NSW Corps, who named the land Burwood Farm, after the land on which he had lived in his native Cornwall, England. Along with John Macarthur and Rev. Samuel Marsden, Rowley was one of the men who purchased merino sheep from the original flock brought to Australia by Captain Waterhouse in 1797. Although Rowley had another farm at Newtown where he lived, he would have pastured some of his sheep at Burwood. His name is remembered in Rowley Street. His tomb was originally laid at Kingston Farm, but has since been re-erected in Waverley Cemetery.

In 1812 the land was bought by well-known Sydney businessman (and farmer), Alexander Riley, who built the district's first house, "Burwood Villa" in 1814. This stood on a site c. 400 m west of the Coronation Club and a small granite obelisk was erected on the western side of Burwood Park to mark the position of the villa, when it was demolished in 1937.

RIley cleared and cultivated 202 hectares (500 acres) of this land and successfully introduced into the colony the orange, lemon, pomegranate, loquat, grape, peach, nectarine, apricot, apple, pear, cherry, plum, fig, chestnut, almond, medlar, quince, raspberry, strawberry and melon.

A stagecoach began running to Parramatta in 1814 and in the 1820s inns were built at staging posts where coaches changed horses at 10-kilometre (6.2 mi) intervals along Parramatta Road. This was the era when bushrangers were a scourge of Parramatta and Liverpool Roads, hiding out in undeveloped lands and making roads unsafe.

In about 1833 the owners of a number of grants commenced to subdivide and sell their lands and thus started the growth of the suburb of Burwood. The Municipality of Burwood was incorporated in 1874. The suburb at the time was a quiet little village with a mere 1200 people and only about 300 buildings. Its southern boundary was Liverpool Road, beyond which lay the even more sparsely settled village of Enfield. The railway from Sydney to Parramatta opened in 1855. There were four stations – Newtown, Ashfield, Burwood and Homebush. In 1874 Five Dock station opened and in 1876 changed its name to Croydon. That same year Concord station opened, renamed Redmyre in 1877 and again renamed to Strathfield railway station in 1885.

In 1860 the number of daily trains to and from Sydney was six each way. Two level crossings at Burwood Road were replaced by overhead bridges in 1892. The third bridge and set of railway lines were built in 1926. Opening the railway was a momentous event for Burwood as it made the suburb easily accessible to the city and brought a number of wealthy merchants and industrialists who built spacious country houses. The population rose from 7400 in 1900 to over 20000 by 1930. In 1912 steam trams were replaced by electric trams. The tram from Ashfield to Enfield was extended to Burwood and Mortlake in 1899 and Cabarita in 1907.

=== Burwood Post Office ===
In 1869 a post office was situated at the railway station. Postal services were previously conducted through general stores. In 1886, a new building was erected at the railway station and in 1892, the present day post office, designed by W. L. Vernon, was opened.

The construction of new post offices continued throughout the Depression years under the leadership of Walter Liberty Vernon who retained office from 1890 to 1911. Although a total of twenty-seven offices were erected between 1892 and 1895, funds available to the new Government Architect's Branch were cut from 1893 to 1895, causing Vernon to postpone many important projects.

George Oakeshott was the assistant draughtsman in Vernon's Office and had responsibility for post office designs. He had arrived in NSW from England in 1891 when he joined the Colonial Architect's Branch and was promoted to chief draughtsman in 1897, a position he held until his resignation in 1900. Reynolds (author) notes that he became the first director of the NSW Works Branch of the Department of Home Affairs, later transferring to the Commonwealth. He attributes the stylistic changes in the design of post offices under Vernon in large part to Oakeshott.

This assertion is reinforced by the fact that the most distinguished English Domestic Revival post offices were erected in the Sydney metropolitan area at locations including Newtown (1893), Enmore (1895), Annandale (1895–96), Arncliffe (1897–98) and Summer Hill (1900). They include details and materials common to the Queen Anne style, attributed especially to Norman Shaw who had been practising successfully in England in this style for some decades. The incorporation of Dutch Renaissance motifs, notably gables with strapwork and volutes is also characteristic. This group of post offices reflects the architectural trends of its day, being in the vanguard of the movement away from neo-Classicism in 1893 and in the mainstream during the late 1890s.

The use of the prominent semi-circular arch or window opening also gained acceptance, during the first decade of Vemon's office. The earliest application no longer remaining in AP (Australia Post) ownership is at Burwood (1892–93), which has both American and English precedent but is most accurately described as being in the American Romanesque style. Following its introductory phase during the early 1890s, the round arch motif remained popular throughout the decades and was continued in use as late as 1910 at Lithgow.

It was during the early 1890s that prominent clock towers were last used, its demise no doubt arising directly from the economic malaise of the period. As a device for corner enrichment, however, a number of substitutes were developed under Vernon. At Glen Innes the corner porch is surmounted by a balcony with low pitched roof in the Arts and Crafts manner. A porch with balcony is a prominent corner element at Narrandera, whilst at Summer Hill a faceted projecting porch and surmounting balcony and roof substitute for one of Barnet's towers. Even at Newcastle (1902–03), conceived somewhat belatedly in the full-blown, Italianate style, there is no tower, but rather domed corner pavilions.

The clock was added to the tower in 1901. The foundation stone was laid by Mrs. J. F. Hennessy, Mayoress in 1892.

== Description ==
A two-storey polychrome brick building with four storey campanile in Italian Romanesque Revival style built in 1892 and designed by W. L. Vemon. The facade is of asymmetrical design dominated by the tower. A massive arched opening leads to the posting boxes. Beautifully detailed brickwork and facade is embellished with sandstone royal insignia, various arched openings, string courses and a sandstone plinth, sixteen pane windows and a terracotta tiled roof.

To sum up some of the characteristics of Vernon's style, emphasis must be placed on the use of brick and stone dressing as building media, gables rather than parapets, irregular massing of volumetric shapes, restricted use of ornamentation in most buildings after the turn of the century, frequent use of the plain rounded arch and semicircular windows: all of these allied to a generally picturesque modest domestic air. Look at almost any of the Vernon suburban or New South Wales country post offices, police stations, court houses and (after 1904) schools, and some or all of these characteristics will be present.

=== Condition ===
As of 7 February 2001, the front facade is in good condition and intact except for the 1930 modification turning the large round headed ground-floor window into an archway over terrazzo steps. The tower and the front main roof are intact. The roofs may need maintenance. The 1892 opening memorial plaque from outside the entry lobby was removed or stolen in early 2007.

Apart from changing the front ground floor window to an archway the front elevation, tower and main roof remain intact and a good example of Vernon's work.

=== Modifications and dates ===
The main round headed window at the front was changed to an archway c. 1930 when terrazzo steps were added to provide a more direct access from the street.

Other internal alterations were probably carried out at that time and later post boxes were added. Two storey additions were added at the rear including a concrete staircase in 1958.

The typical internal counter details were removed possibly in the 1970s and recently the interiors have been cleared of all fittings.

== Heritage listing ==
As at 8 March 2006, an excellent example of a suburban post office designed by the government architect W. L. Vernon in the Federation Anglo Dutch Revival style. The asymmetrical facade of well detailed brickwork has a massive arch at ground level and other openings with semi-circular arches, all characteristic of the style. The square campanile is a more Italianate element, which enables the post office to be a focus of the townscape.

Burwood Post Office is a landmark building and is clearly visible from many parts of the Municipality that has become an icon for the community, which uses it as a logo on many documents and other places both now and in the past. It is arguably the most well known building in Burwood.

It is part of a significant and architecturally outstanding group of public buildings, particularly Post Offices, designed by the government architect of the day Walter Liberty Vernon and is a rare example of a secular building with a corner tower.

Burwood Post Office has always been close to and associated with Burwood Station, which is identified in the State Heritage Inventory. For many years it was located in part of the station buildings and there still remains the last building used as a post office on the south side of the tracks to the west of Burwood Road.

It should also be considered as part of a group associated with communications including the Station and the structure earlier used as a post office.

It is considered to be of Regional and State significance because of its long association with the area, its association with an outstanding group of buildings by the Government Architect Walter Liberty Vernon, particularly his Post Offices, the quality of its design and construction including its rare tower element, which is a landmark in the region.

This statement applies to that part of the building designed by W. L. Vernon. Later additions to the building are of lesser or no significance.

Burwood Post Office was listed on the New South Wales State Heritage Register on 18 May 2001 having satisfied the following criteria.

The place is important in demonstrating the course, or pattern, of cultural or natural history in New South Wales.

In 1892, the present day Post Office, designed by W. L. Vernon, was opened.

The construction of new post offices continued throughout the Depression years under the leadership of Walter Liberty Vernon who retained office from 1890 to 1911. Although a total of twenty-seven offices were erected between 1892 and 1995

The most distinguished English Domestic Revival post offices were erected in the Sydney metropolitan area at locations including Newtown (1893), Enmore (1895), Annandale (1895–96), Arncliffe (1897–98) and Summer Hill (1900). They include details and materials common to the Queen Anne style, attributed especially to Norman Shaw who had been practising successfully in England in this style for some decades. The incorporation of Dutch Renaissance motifs, notably gables with strapwork and volutes is also characteristic. This group of post offices reflects the architectural trends of its day, being in the vanguard of the movement away from neo-Classicism in 1893 and in the mainstream during the late 1890s.

The use of the prominent semi-circular arch or window opening also gained acceptance, during the first decade of Vemon'.s office. The earliest application no longer remaining in AP (Australia Post) ownership is at Burwood (1892–93), which has both American and English precedent but is most accurately described as being in the American Romanesque style.

Following its introductory phase during the early 1890s, the round arch motif remained popular throughout the decades and was continued in use as late as 1910 at Lithgow.

It was during the early 1890s that prominent clock towers were last used, its demise no doubt arising directly from the economic malaise of the period.

The place is important in demonstrating aesthetic characteristics and/or a high degree of creative or technical achievement in New South Wales.

The asymmetrical facade of well detailed brickwork has a massive arch at ground level and other openings with semi-circular arches, all characteristic of the style. The square campanile is a more Italianate element, which enables the post office to be a focus of the townscape.'

A two-storey polychrome brick building with four storey campanile in Italian Romanesque Revival style built in 1892 and designed by W. L. Vemon.

The facade is of asymmetrical design dominated by the tower. A massive arched opening leads to the posting boxes. Beautifully detailed brickwork and facade is embellished with sandstone royal insignia, various arched openings, string courses and a sandstone plinth. Sixteen pane windows. Terracotta tiled roof.

To sum up some of the characteristics of Vernon's style, emphasis must be placed on the use of brick and stone dressing as building media, gables rather than parapets, irregular massing of volumetric shapes, restricted use of ornamentation in most buildings after the turn of the century, frequent use of the plain rounded arch and semicircular windows: all of these allied to a generally picturesque modest domestic air.

The place has a strong or special association with a particular community or cultural group in New South Wales for social, cultural or spiritual reasons.

In 1869 a post office was situated at the railway station. Postal services were previously conducted through general stores. In 1886, a new building was erected at the railway station and in 1892, the present day Post Office, designed by W. L. Vernon, was opened.

This post office as an essential service has been associated with the people of Burwood for more than 100 years and a post office of some sort has been located in the immediate vicinity since the inception of the Municipality.

The clock, added to the tower shortly after the Post Office was built, has played an important role in the lives of the community. Since the clock stopped working after Australia Post vacated the premises many people have contacted Council to ask that it be kept working and at the right time.

The place possesses uncommon, rare or endangered aspects of the cultural or natural history of New South Wales.

The square campanile is a more Italianate element, which enables the post office to be a focus of the townscape.' Burwood Post Office is a landmark building, clearly visible from many parts of the Municipality and has become an icon for the community, which uses it as a logo on many documents and other places both now and in the past. It is arguably the most well known building in Burwood.

The place is important in demonstrating the principal characteristics of a class of cultural or natural places/environments in New South Wales.

An excellent example of a suburban post office designed by the government architect W. L. Vernon in the Federation Anglo Dutch Revival style. The asymmetrical facade of well detailed brickwork has a massive arch at ground level and other openings with semi-circular arches, all characteristic of the style.

== See also ==
- Australian residential architectural styles
