= Woodstock, Burwood =

Woodstock
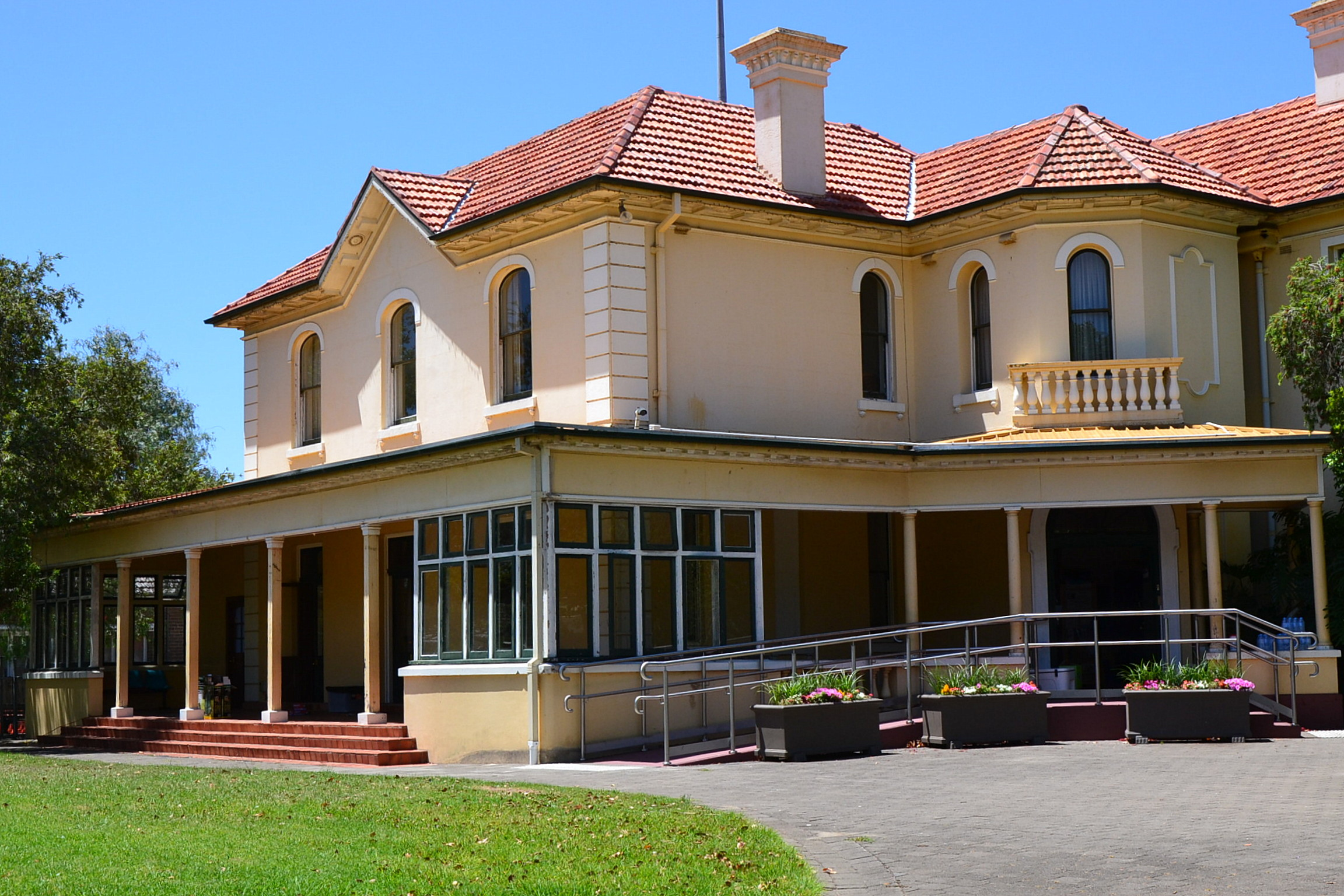

- Location within Sydney
- Former names: Broughton (1912–1982)

General information
- Type: Mansion
- Architectural style: Victorian Italianate
- Location: 22 Church Street, Burwood, New South Wales, Australia
- Coordinates: 33.8819°S 151.1045°E
- Construction started: c. 1866
- Completed: 1873
- Owner: Burwood Council

Technical details
- Floor count: 2

Website
- www.burwood.nsw.gov.au/services/venue_hire/venue_hire_woodstock.html

Register of the National Estate
- Official name: Woodstock Community Centre, 18-30 Church St, Burwood, NSW, Australia
- Type: Defunct register
- Designated: 14 May 1991
- Reference no.: 3373

New South Wales Heritage Database (Local Government Register)
- Official name: Woodstock; Broughton Migrant Hostel
- Type: Built
- Criteria: a., b., c., d., g.
- Designated: 10 March 1995
- Reference no.: Local register
- Group/collection: Community Facilities
- Category: Mansion
- Builder: Edwin Thomas Penfold

Woodstock is a heritage-listed mansion in the Sydney suburb of Burwood, New South Wales, Australia. It was built between c. 1866 and 1873 by Edwin Thomas Penfold and changed hands a number of times before being acquired by Burwood Council. During World War II the property was acquired by the Australian Government for military purposes. The Victorian Italianate villa is listed on the (now defunct) Australian Register of the National Estate and the Burwood Council local government heritage list.

== History ==
=== Construction ===
Edwin Thomas Penfold, who made his fortune working on the goldfields and by establishing a successful tobacco business in Sydney, was living in the suburb of Randwick, at a cottage called Sandgate, when he decided to purchase 6 acres of land at Church Street, Burwood, in 1871. He ordered the construction of Woodstock, a two-storey, Victorian Italianate villa, where he moved in with his wife Susannah Clarke. His son was later born there. (It is believed the name Woodstock was derived from the novel written by Sir Walter Scott, published in 1826, named Woodstock.) The house remained with the Penfold family until 1895. One of Penfold's descendants would later buy William Moffitt's printing and stationery firm and renamed it W. C. Penfold & Co, one of the largest stationery companies in Australia.

Until 1907, Woodstock was owned by Edward Scholes, a prominent local identity of the Strathfield and Burwood areas. He was a barrister and later a Judge of the District Court of New South Wales. Scholes had a long involvement in local government, serving as an Alderman on Burwood Council for twelve years and Mayor in 1891. He later lived at Brunyarra in Strathfield. In 1886, he married Gertrude Annie Keep, daughter of John Keep, who ran Keep McPherson Hardware Merchants and was a member of a prominent local family.

=== Broughton ===
In 1907, Woodstock was acquired by Sir Arthur Renwick, a physician, philanthropist and politician, but he died the next year, leaving the estate to his family. In 1912, the property was purchased by the Keep sisters, Miss Amy Isabel and Miss Edith Ellen, who renamed it Broughton after their earlier home Broughton Hall in the suburb of Leichhardt. Broughton Hall later became a psychiatric clinic and eventually merged with Rozelle Hospital.

The Keep sisters maintained a beautiful garden at Broughton, and it is believed they were responsible for many of the internal alterations that can be seen today, such as the current entrance, the staircase and hall, the leadlight skylight, the pressed metal ceilings and the Art Nouveau stained glass window. The house is not heavily decorated, has a new tiled roof and a partly enclose verandah. The original wooden staircase is in good condition. The entry is marked by remnant planting of ficus trees to the end of Duff Street.

In 1942, the building was taken over by the Australian Government to be used as one of the 28 army bases for the Australian Women's Army Service Barracks which comprised both LTD and a General Details Depot until 1946. After that, the Reverence W. Deane, Principal, briefly occupied the house with his Methodist Ladies College Burwood (MLCB).

=== Broughton Migrant Hostel ===
Between 1948 and 1974, the house operated as the Broughton Migrant Hostel for immigrant families from Europe and Great Britain. Burwood Council leased the property from 1976 until 1982, when it was purchased from the Australian Government. The Council restored the original name, Woodstock, and began using the house as a community centre.

== Gallery ==
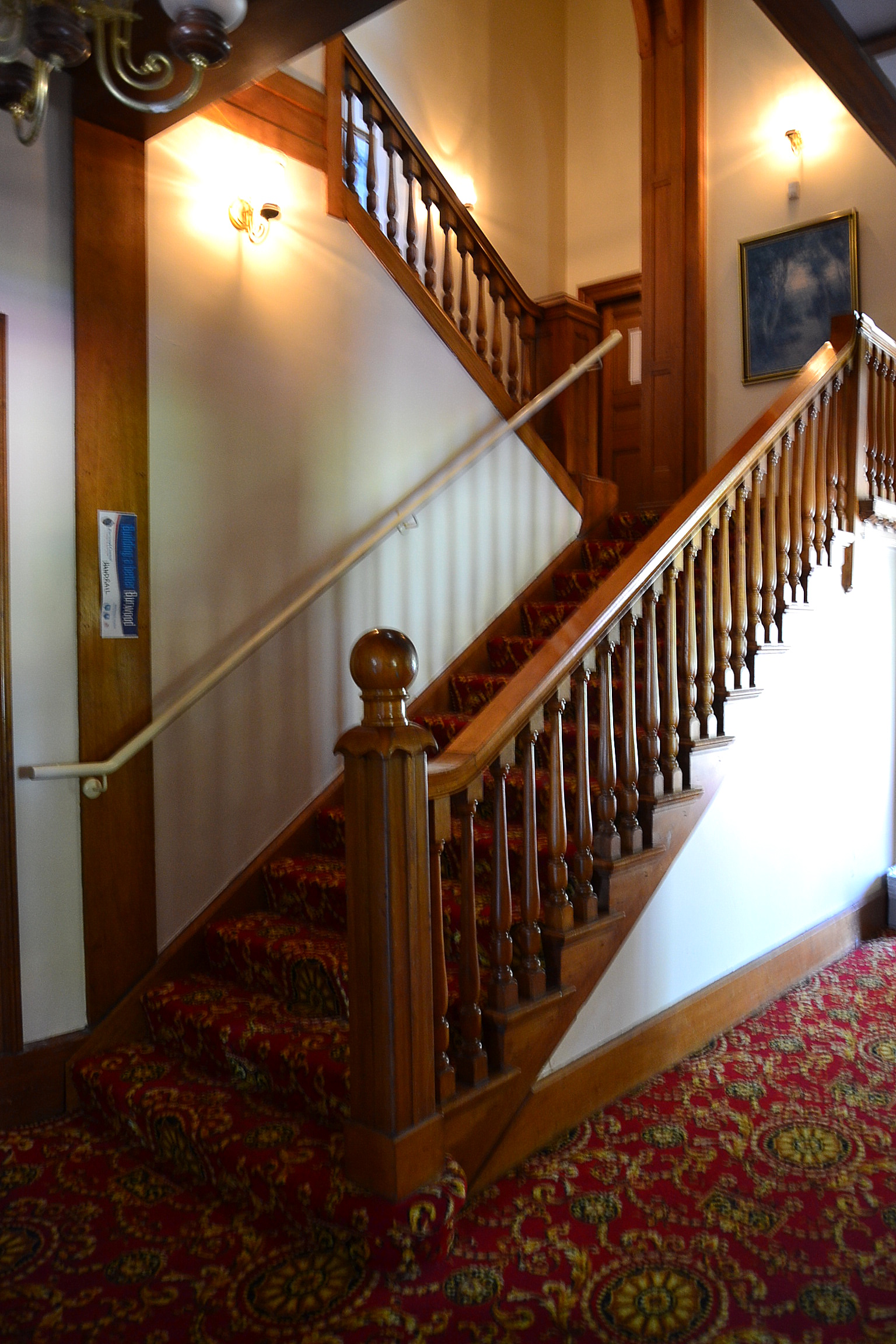
Staircase

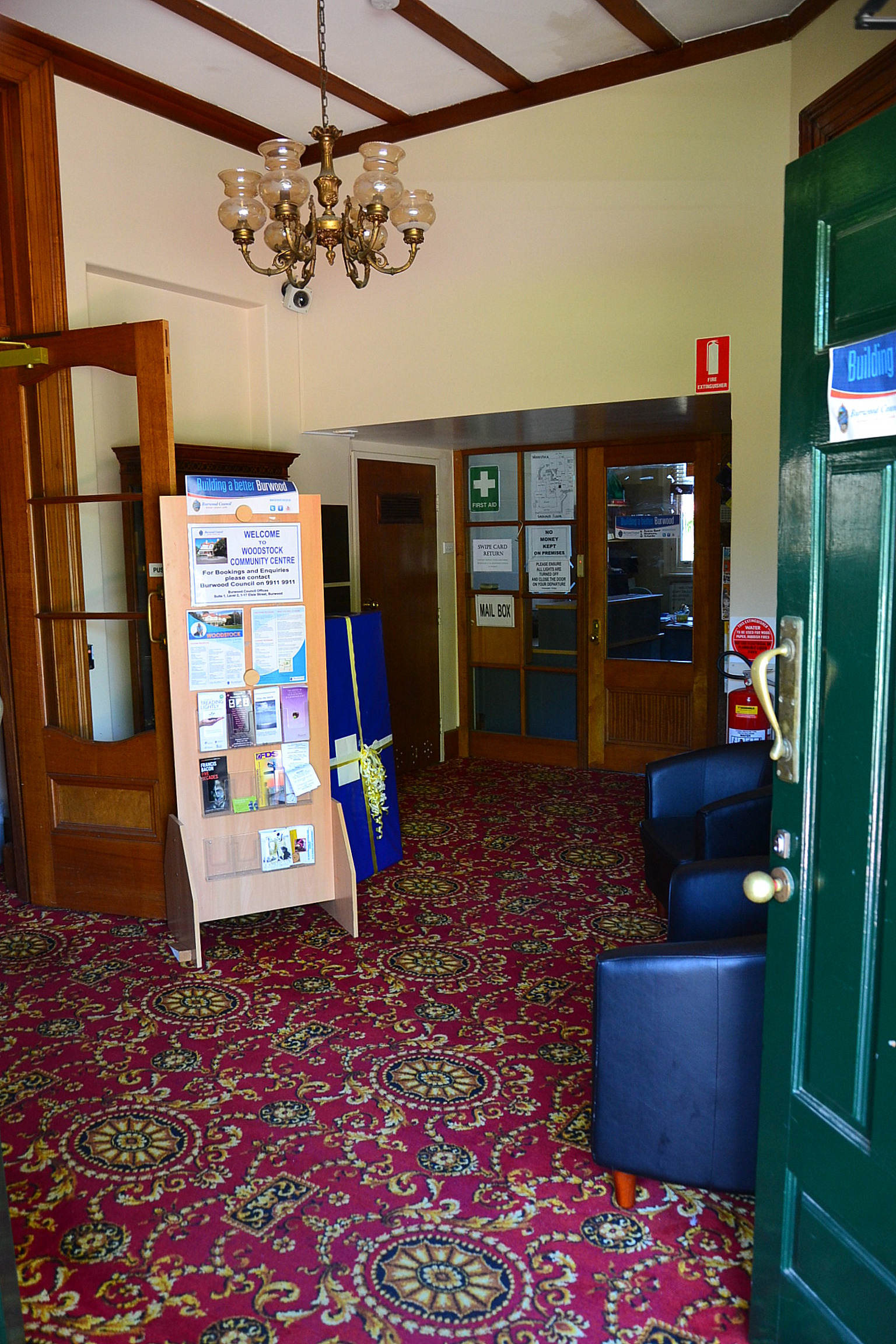
Hallway

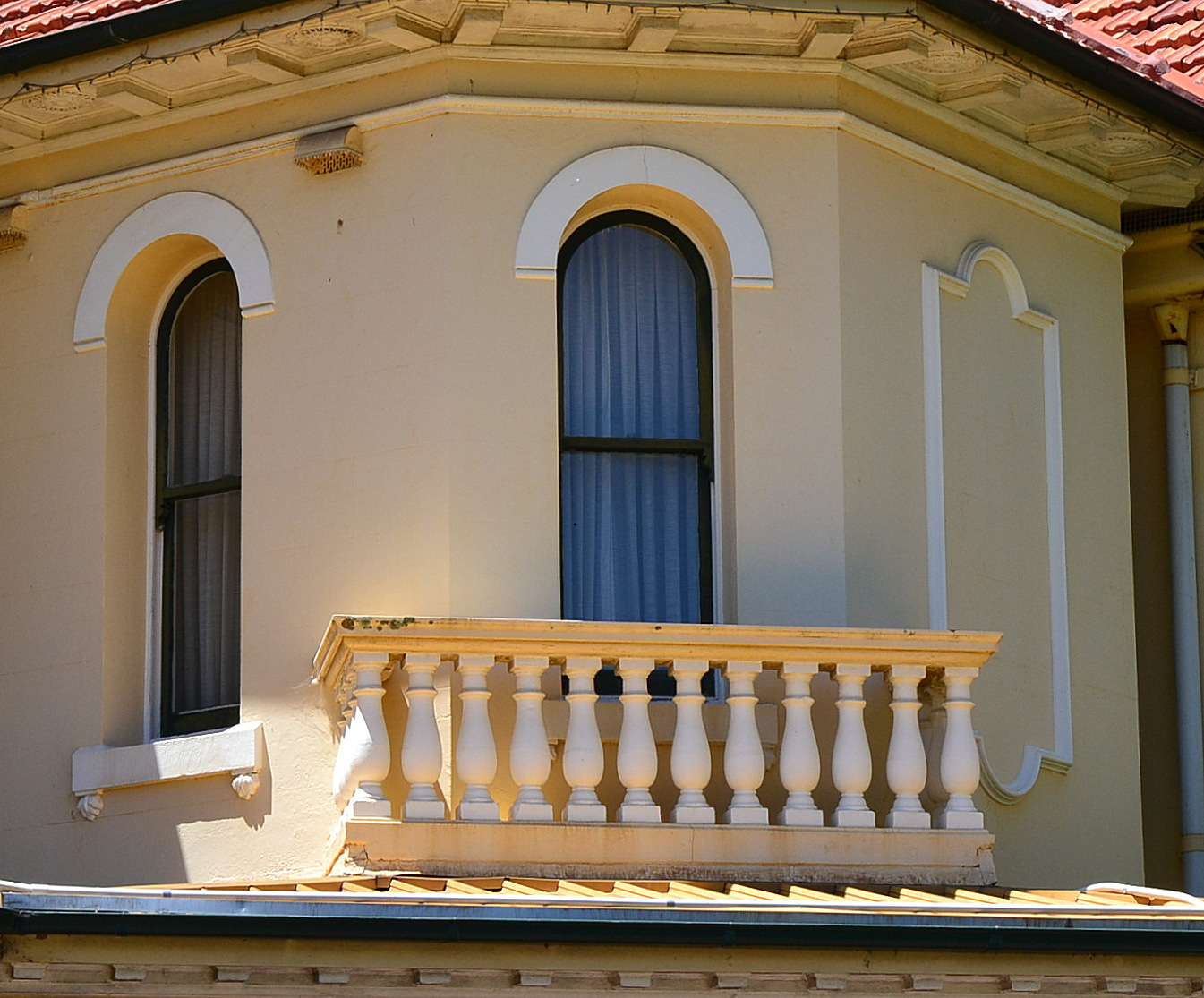
Upper floor with balustrade

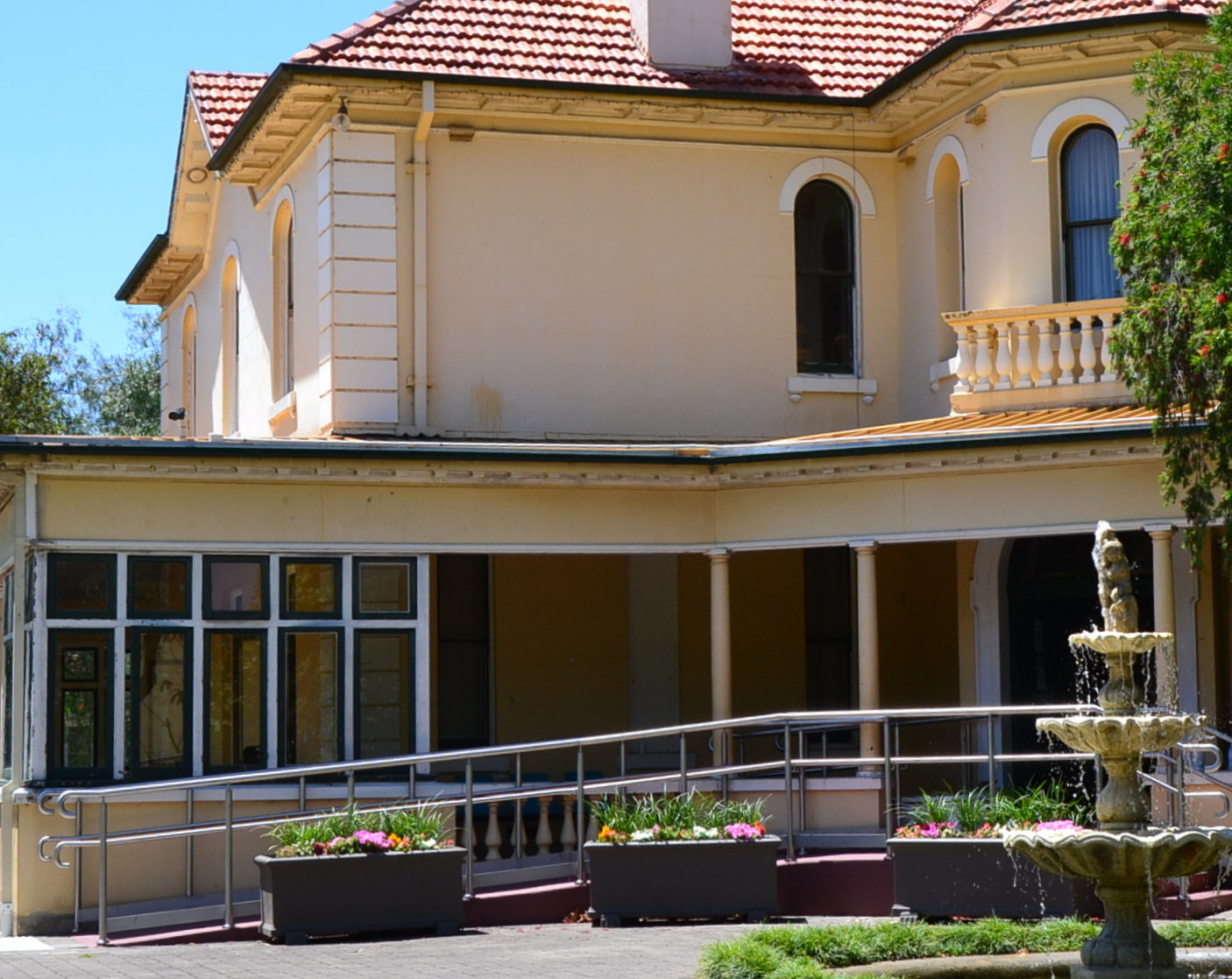
West side of house

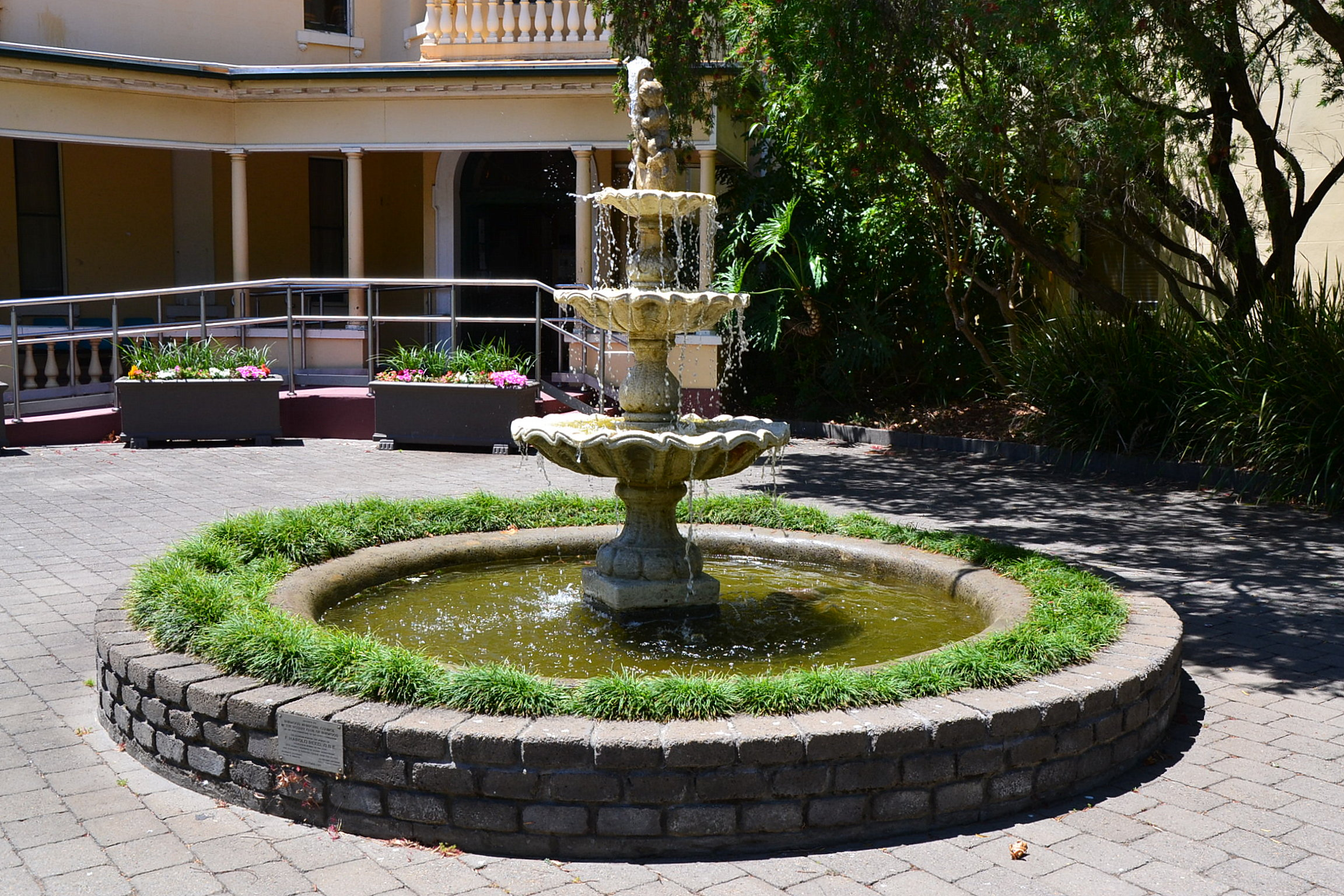
Fountain
