= Woodstock Road =

Woodstock Road may refer to:

- Woodstock Road (Oxford), in Oxford, England
- Woodstock Road railway station
- Woodstock Road Baptist Church, located in Summertown, Oxford, England
- Woodstock Road (Maryland), in Woodstock, Maryland
- The main road in Cregagh, Belfast
