= Woodstock Airport =

Woodstock Airport may refer to:

== Canada ==
- Woodstock Airport (New Brunswick) near Woodstock, New Brunswick, Canada (TC: CCD3)
- Woodstock Airport (Ontario) near Woodstock, Ontario, Canada (TC: CPR5)

== United States ==
- Woodstock Airport (Connecticut), in South Woodstock, Connecticut, USA (FAA: 64CT)
- Woodstock Airport (Florida), in Fort Myers, Florida, USA (FAA: FL86)
- Woodstock Airport (Maryland), in Chesapeake City, Maryland, USA (FAA: MD03)
- Woodstock Airport (Virginia), in Woodstock, Virginia, USA (FAA: VG55)

== Other places ==
- Donnington Airpark, also known as Woodstock Airport, in Woodstock, Queensland, Australia (ICAO: YDOP)
