= Woodstock Township, Schuyler County, Illinois =

Coordinates: 40°03′35″N 90°37′03″W

Woodstock Township
- Township
- Location in Schuyler County

- Schuyler County's location in Illinois
- Country: United States
- State: Illinois
- County: Schuyler
- Established: November 8, 1853

Area
  - Total: 37.32 sq mi (96.7 km^{2})
  - Land: 37.31 sq mi (96.6 km^{2})
  - Water: 0.01 sq mi (0.026 km^{2}) 0.03%

Population (2010)
  - Estimate (2016): 357
  - Density: 10.4/sq mi (4.0/km^{2})
- Time zone: UTC-6 (CST)
  - Summer (DST): UTC-5 (CDT)
- FIPS code: 17-169-83362

Woodstock Township is located in Schuyler County, Illinois. As of the 2010 census, its population was 388 and it contained 177 housing units.

== Geography ==
According to the 2010 census, the township has a total area of 37.32 square miles (96.7 km^{2}), of which 37.31 square miles (96.6 km^{2}) (or 99.97%) is land and 0.01 square miles (0.026 km^{2}) (or 0.03%) is water.

== Demographics ==
Historical population
Census	Pop.	Note	%±
2016 (est.)	357
U.S. Decennial Census
