= Woodstock Elementary School =

Woodstock High School can refer to:

- Woodstock Elementary School, part of Bibb County School District in Woodstock, Alabama
- Woodstock Elementary School (Georgia), in Woodstock, Georgia
- Woodstock Elementary School (Maine), in Bryant Pond, Maine
- Woodstock School (Portland, Oregon), also known as Woodstock Elementary School, part of Portland Public Schools (Oregon) in Portland, Oregon
- Woodstock Elementary School (Utah), in Murray, Utah
