= Woodstock High School =

Woodstock High School may refer to:

- Woodstock High School (Georgia)
- Woodstock High School (Illinois)
- Woodstock High School (New Brunswick)

== See also ==
- Woodstock North High School (Illinois)
- Woodstock Union High School (Vermont)
