= Shubra Hall =

Suburban estate in New South Wales, Australia

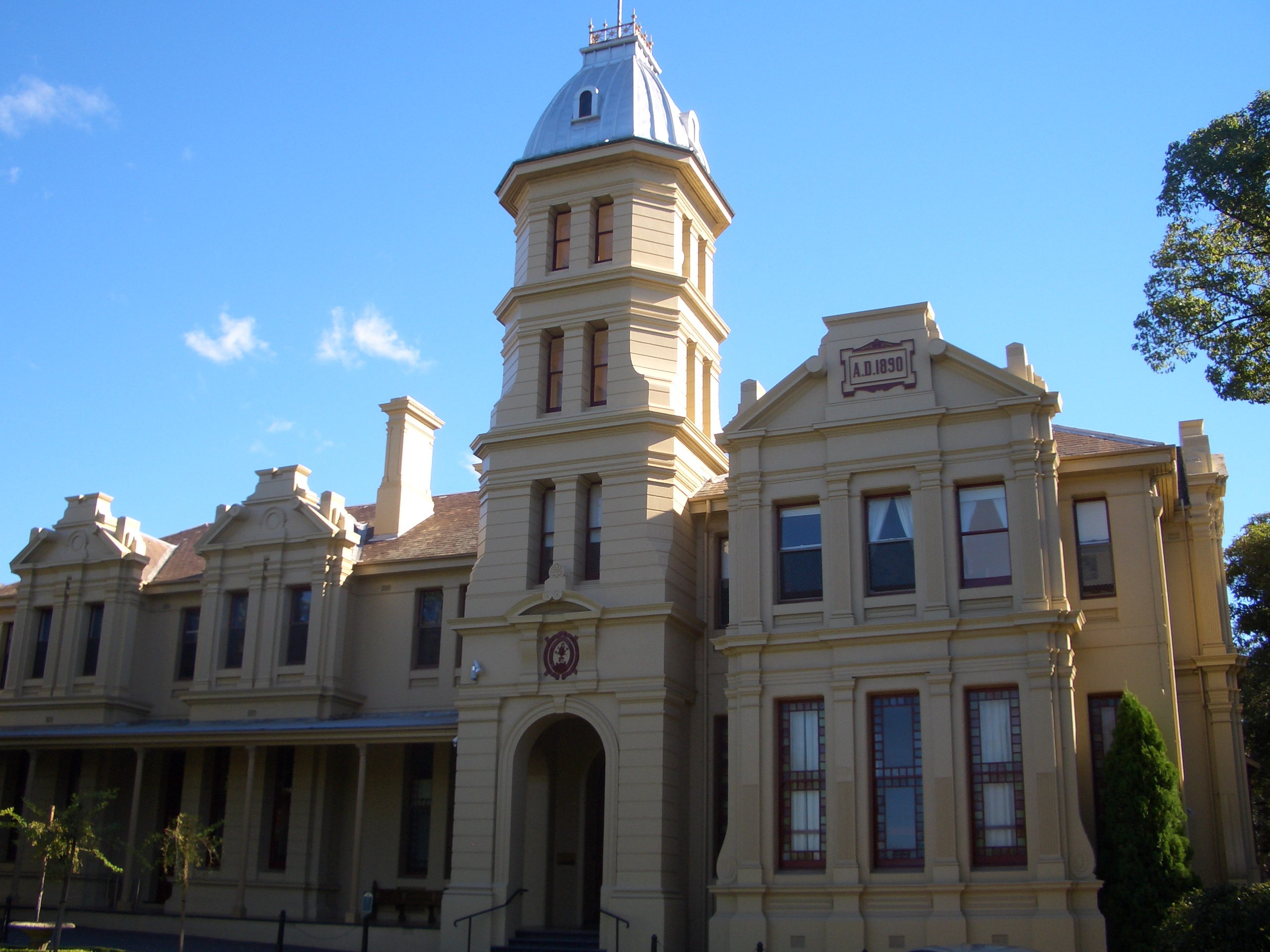
- Shubra Hall, 2007

- Location within Sydney Location within Australia
- 33°52′54″S 151°06′59″E
- Location: Boundary Street, Croydon, Municipality of Burwood, New South Wales, Australia

History
- Built: 1869–1888
- Built for: Anthony Horden III

Site notes
- Architect: Albert Bond
- Architectural style: Victorian Second Empire
- Owner: Presbyterian Ladies' College, Sydney

New South Wales Heritage Register
- Official name: Shubra Hall, including stables and garden; Presbyterian Ladies College; PLC Croydon; Hordernville
- Type: state heritage (built)
- Designated: 19 December 2014
- Reference no.: 1939
- Type: Mansion
- Category: Residential buildings (private)

Shubra Hall is a heritage-listed former semi-rural suburban estate and mansion residence and now administration building for school purposes at Boundary Street in the Sydney suburb of Croydon, Municipality of Burwood, New South Wales, Australia. It was designed by Albert Bond and built from 1869 to 1888 in the Victorian Second Empire architectural style. It is also known as Presbyterian Ladies' College, PLC Croydon and Hordernville. The property is owned by the Presbyterian Ladies' College, Sydney and was added to the New South Wales State Heritage Register on 19 December 2014.

== History ==
Shubra Hall is located on part of 304 hectares (750 acres) granted to Captain Thomas Rowley on 9 August 1803 (Burwood Estate) and on part of 40 hectares (100 acres) granted to Augustus Alt, Surveyor General to the Colony (Ashfield Park Estate). These two grants covered most of Burwood and Croydon.

Thirteen acres and two roods of land were consolidated under a single Certificate of Title on 4 August 1868 in the name of Anthony Horden III, draper, in the City of Sydney. Tertius, as he was known, owned the fabulous Hordern department store in Sydney with his brother Samuel. Their father noted that Tertius "has bought a farm at Ashfield for A£1200 – he has agreed to pay £500 cash, the rest on mortgage." He moved out of his cottage near his father's home at Darling Point and lived initially in the stables at Croydon 'in order to supervise the work more closely' including the fencing of 10 hectares (25 acres) of land. This suggests that the stables pre-date the main house; however, there are no known original design drawings for house, stables or garden.

The design of "Shubra Hall" has been attributed to architect Albert Bond, who achieved prominence as City Architect between 1873 and 1877, and was long associated with the Hordern brothers. He designed the Anthony Hordern and Sons department store building in the Haymarket and their New Palace Emporium on Brickfield Hill, as well as Sam's home at Bowral. He also designed the school buildings adjoining Shubra Hall for PLC in 1889–90.

Shubra Hall was a "Villa Garden", based on the notion of "a country mansion built together with farm-buildings and occupied by a person of some position and wealth". The architectural style of the residence is identifiable as "Victorian Second Empire" and unusual for being found in a domestic residence. H. G. Woffenden discussed the design in his PhD on nineteenth-century architecture in NSW:

'Two ornate Sydney suburban villas may be regarded as heralds of the Boom Style that reached a climax in the mid-eighties. The larger (Shubra Park) built for Anthony Hordern at Croydon, reflected the influence of second empire style, popular at the time in Sydney public buildings . . . Although the tower with its steep, fish-scale patterned roof was nominally second-empire, the lavish decoration applied to the entire exterior as s a three dimensional non-structural layer was a mixture of crude Romanesque and Byzantine. Plaster ornaments, chamfers, blind arcading, polygonal columns and strange capitals in the entrance, as well as balconies and verandahs bedecked with cast-iron-admittedly limited in extent-these made an exotic display. Excesses of this kind prompted the comment attributed to Professor Leslie Wilkinson, that architecture at the time "added ten percent for pomp".'

— H. G. Woffenden

Anthony III named his new home "Shubra Hall" for reasons that are now obscure; "Shubra" was also used as a middle name for members of the Hordern family at that time. the place was also known as Shubra Park and Hordernville in the Sands Directory. The house appears to have been completed by September 1869 when the birth of a son to Mrs. Anthony Hordern III "at her residence, Shubra Park, Ashfield" was announced in The Sydney Morning Herald. A short time before, Hordern had put his signature on a counter petition opposing the formation of Burwood Municipal Council, identifying himself as a resident of the district.

The Hordern family "created many celebrated gardens around their residences". Anthony ('Tertius') Hordern III's Shubra Hall is described by Tanner and Britton in their entry on the family's gardens in The Oxford Companion to Australian Gardens as'a high-Victorian villa on a landscaped hilltop (now Presbyterian Ladies' College) at Croydon'. There is also mention of his father Anthony Hordern's Retford Hall at Darling Point and country seat Retford Park in Bowral, his brother Samuel Hordern's Babworth House at Darling Point, and other close relatives, Anthony Hordern's Milton Park at Bowral, Lebbeus Hordern's Hopewood House, Edward Carr Hordern's Chislehurst at Chatswood and Alfred Hordern's Highlands house designed by John Horbury Hunt at Wahroonga.

Within three years of purchasing the land in 1868, Hordern undertook the first subdivision of his property. A proposed second subdivision of his property, "Hawthordern Estate" was cancelled in December 1880. Shubra Hall was located on the largest parcel Anthony Hordern advertised for an auction sale on 14 April 1882, where it was described as "that delightfully situated and tastefully designed family mansion on the hill, north of Croydon Railway Station, comprising a magnificent mansion and improved grounds; area about 5 acres". The advertisement contained a detailed description of the house and grounds. Tertius appears to have remained in occupation of Shubra Hall until September when he advertised the auction sale of "the whole of his very elegant and recherche household furniture and effects ... in consequence of his projected departure for England". The Mutual Provident Land Investing and Building Society (Limited) sold Shubra Hall and grounds (comprising four acres and three roods) in December 1882 to John Coghlan of Pitt Street, Sydney, Diamond Drill owner, for a sum of £6,489.

John Coghlan and his family had moved into Shubra Hall by June 1884. The Australian Town and Country Journal published an illustrated feature article in which Shubra Hall was depicted with the following description:

'Mr. Coglan's (sic) residence, situated in one of the highest parts of the town or surroundings, and a really fine mass of architecture, and a lofty tower at the back caps the pile... A fine view of the surrounding country is obtained from here.'

— Australian Town and Country Journal

Coghlan was an active member of the Croydon community. In May 1886 he attended a large public meeting of residents and property-holders to demand the Government provide better station accommodation, formation of a goods siding and purchase of a public park at Croydon. He was elected to the executive committee which was formed at this meeting. In the same year a notice appeared reporting the birth of a daughter to Mrs J. Coghlan of Shubra Hall, Croydon. Coghlan experienced severe financial stress in 1889, on the eve of the 1890s depression, and was unable to sustain the mortgage payments on Shubra Hall. Coghlan and family moved to Glebe Point where he died in July 1896 aged 61, leaving behind a widow and seven children.

The auction sale of Shubra Hall was advertised on 3 September 1889, and it sold to John Hay Goodlet, Alexander Dean and James Balfour Elphinstone, guarantors of the Presbyterian Church in New South Wales, for the reported sum of £7,500.

=== Presbyterian Ladies' College and Shubra Hall ===
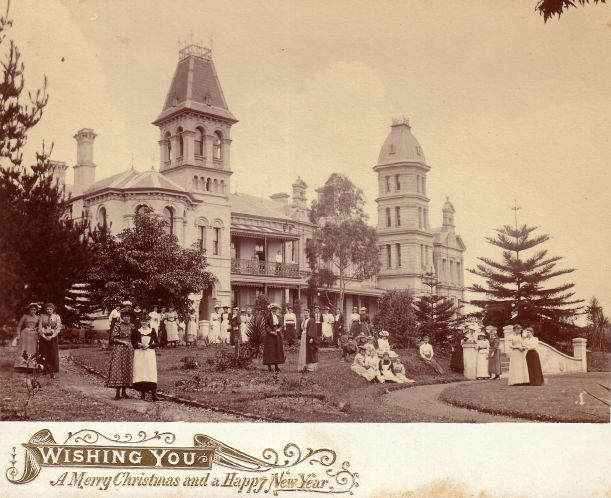
Shubra Hall, 1892

In 1883 the General Assembly of the Presbyterian Church in New South Wales resolved to locate a site, obtain funds and establish a Ladies' College in New South Wales. In 1887 several gentlemen from the Presbyterian Church signed a lease on a gentleman's residence at Ashfield, "Femlea", commencing on 7 January 1888. The General Assembly appointed Dr John Marden principal of the College and he and his family took up temporary residence there while seeking a permanent site for the school.

Within the first month there were 30 students enrolled in the Presbyterian Ladies' College (PLC), of which 15 were boarders. By year's end student numbers had increased rapidly and accommodation for boarders was stretched. The church continued looking for permanent accommodation for the school. About this time Shubra Hall at Croydon was advertised for sale, and was duly purchased at auction by Church representatives, Goodlet, Dean and Elphinstone. Following the acquisition, a committee was formed in November to decide upon the requirements for additional school buildings needed on the site and select an architect. Documentation confirms that Albert Bond was appointed architect for the extension (even if it cannot be confirmed that he was the original architect of Shubra Hall). 'By the beginning of the school year of 1891 the new site was complete and ready to commence functioning as the permanent home of P.L.C. The total cost of the new buildings and renovations was £25,000.'

The new Presbyterian Ladies' College at Croydon was officially opened in March 1891 by the Governor of New South Wales. The main college building, comprising Boarding House, Dining Room and College Hall, "adjoins the residence of the principal, Dr John Marden" (Shubra Hall) and stands "in the midst of a spacious block of ground, six acres in extent, which is being laid out in lawn tennis courts, gardens, etc, in an elevated position, it forms, with its tower 26 metres (84 ft) high, a very conspicuous feature in the landscape".

The Australian Dictionary of Biography entry on "John Marden" mentions that he trained as a lawyer but was "keenly interested in horticulture" and "laid out beautiful gardens and playing fields" for the Croydon campus. He did the same again when he moved to Pymble in 1916 after 20 hectares (50 acres) were purchased for an additional campus for the school. An anonymous historical account describing the fostering of science at PLC in part through the nurturing of the gardens explains:

'An ex-student of PLC remembers Dr Marden as a keen horticulturist who was responsible for planning the gardens at Croydon. He directed that both native and exotic shrubs and trees be planted to help the young ladies in the practical aspects of botany. Many photographs capture these early plantings which very quickly replaced the grapevines which had originally occupied the area directly in front of Shubra Hall. In the 1894 collage which shows the grapevines, it is also possible to discern a bush-house or a large bird-cage in the garden near the tennis courts. Photographs from 1905 show changes in the growth patterns of the gardens; the pines are noticeably taller, new fruit trees have replaced the grape vines and palms are flourishing near the science wing (now the archive). Albert Evans was employed as Head Gardener. He stayed in that position for 43 years and, for part of that time, lived in the stable loft (above the archive and the shop). . . It became popular in the 1920s, 1930s and 1940s to hold garden parties, plays and pageants in the gardens. The 50th Anniversary of the college was celebrated in 1938 by the staging of a pageant, "Under this Gum Tree" written by Flora Eldershaw as the item to close the celebrations. The entire school performed the garden below the great white gum.'

An anonymous short history of Shubra Hall dating from around 1986 describes the different uses of the mansion within the school:

'Shubra Hall, which has only recently regained currency as the name of the original building, has had its own history within that of the College. Built in about 1868 for Anthony Hordern by Albert Bond, it was used by the Horderns and their six children before being sold to James Coghlan, diamond drill merchant, and by him to the Presbyterian Church. In 1891 it became the home of Dr. Marden and his family, with his study downstairs and the "front and back" sitting-rooms for entertaining.' A 1905 photo shows these, the dividing doors pushed back, with their wealth of furniture and ornament. The youngest Hordern daughter, Ruth, was married during the 1914–18 war in the main bedroom, where her mother was confined after breaking both knee-caps.

'In 1918, Dr and Mrs. Marden moved to Pymble to enable him to devote most of his time to the P.L.C. opened there in 1916, of which he was Principal jointly with Croydon until his retirement in 1919. 'As Dr E. Neil McQueen, the Vice-Principal who succeeded him.as Principal at Croydon, was already established in the "Red House", (now the site of the primary school), "Shubra Hall" was used for reception rooms, study and offices and for the Kindergarten under Miss Froggatt, upstairs. It was also the home of Mrs. Wallace, Mrs Marden's sister, who was the centre of the College's musical life from its Ashfield days, the moving spirit of its Student Christian Union and long-time editor of the school magazine. 'From May, 1942, until the war ended in 1945, Shubra Hall served a rather different purpose as the administration block of No. 1 Radar Development and Installation Unit of the R.A.A.F., and the Principal's study became the commanding officer's office, while the Kindergarten gave way to the Sergeants' recreation room.

'In 1946, Miss Macindoe shared the first floor with dormitories and it continued as the Principal's quarters, being extensively renovated during Miss Dyson's tenure in 1978. (From the sixties, Shubra Hall was also home to a succession of labradors, Principals' companions). Downstairs, the back sitting- room was used for most of Miss Whitlam's time as the Bursar's office. . . The Principal's study is now upstairs in Shubra Hall . . . where the remaining rooms are offices, while the downstairs sitting-rooms and study are reception and conference rooms, the whole still presenting the pleasant, well- cared-for atmosphere of its earlier days.'

=== Anthony (Tertius) Horden III, (built and occupied Shubra Hall 1868–1882) ===
Anthony Horden III (known as Tertius) was born on 24 July 1842 at Melbourne, the eldest son of Anthony Hordern (1817–1876). He was educated in Sydney, Melbourne and at Rugby, England. By 1869 his father (also Anthony) had taken him and his brother into partnership in the family department store business, which was then vigorously expanded. In 1878 "The Warehouse" and the "Palace Emporium" were constructed and commenced operation. According to the Bulletin, 22 May 1880, they "fairly ruled the retail trade of the metropolis and the colony in general". They adopted the trade-mark of the spreading oak over the motto, 'While I live I'll grow'. In 1881–82 the company opened offices in Britain, the Continent, America and China. In 1883 Tertius proposed a scheme to the Legislative Council of Western Australia called the Beverly-Albany Railway Scheme, for which he formed a syndicate in England to construct a railway line and encourage migration. Tertius died at sea from brain fever on 16 September 1886 on his return voyage to Australia, aged just 44. He left an estate of £190,800, and was survived by four children and his wife Elizabeth.

=== John Francis Coghlan (occupied Shubra Hall 1882–1889) ===
John Francis Coghlan was born in Ireland in 1835 and may have arrived in Australia with the Victorian gold rush in the 1850s. According to an obituary which appeared in the Freeman's Journal, Coghlan's connection to mining commenced in the early 1850s in Victoria "and what money he made then and subsequently was employed in the development of mining". By 1874 he was in Sydney where he married Josephine Murphy in St Mary's Church. Four years later he formed the Australian Diamond Rock Drill and Boring Company Limited to manufacture diamond rock drills and commenced his own boring experiments at the Sydney Coal Company's works at Newington on the Parramatta River. The experiment was not successful and he turned his attention to other sites in the vicinity of Sydney, drilling bores at Port Hacking, Holt-Sutherland, Moorebank, Heathcote, and Moore Park and Rose Bay. He discovered two fine seams of coal at Stockton and Cockle Creek in Newcastle. In 1889, Coghlan was declared insolvent and was forced to sell his residence at Croydon. With his large family he moved to Glebe Point where he died on 10 July 1896, aged 61 years.

=== Albert Bond (attributed architect of Shubra Hall) ===
Albert Bond was appointed the first full time architect to the Municipal Council of Sydney and served in that position from 1873 to 1877. He is believed to be responsible for the detailed design of the turrets, addition of the stained glass dome and for the decoration of the Vestibule of the Sydney Town Hall. Following his resignation he formed his own architectural practice with offices in Bell's Chamber, 129 Pitt Street. He was responsible for the design of a large number of stores and commercial buildings, but his most notable buildings were the two Anthony Hordern and Sons department stores in Sydney. Bond died on 27 March 1923 at Omrah Private Hospital. He never married. His substantial body of work includes:

- Anthony Hordern and Sons, The Palace Emporium and The New Palace Emporium
- Harrison, Jones & Devlin, wool and produce store (1882)
- Farmer & Co store (1883)
- Presbyterian Church, Botany (1879)
- Athanaeum Club, Sydney (1887)
- Retford Park, Old South Road, Bowral, for Samuel Hordern in a Victorian Italianate style (1887)
- Congregational Church, Pitt Street (internal alterations) (1879)
- Congregational Church, Hunters Hill
- Sydney Female Refuge, Glebe (1902)
- Ragged School, Harrington Street (1873)
- Agricultural Society Show – pavilions for Anderson & Co at Moore Park (1899)
- Scot's Church Manse, Sydney (1882)
- Equitable Permanent Benefit Building, Land and Savings Society Building (1886) "Southall", 88 Barney Street, Armidale (1886).

Comparative places

Comparable mansions include Tertius' father Anthony Hordern's Retford Hall designed by Edmund Blacket, Darling Point (demolished 1967) and Tertius' brother Samuel Hordern's Retford Park, Old South Road, Bowral, 1887, designed by Albert Bond. Glenworth, Victoria Street, Ashfield is an Italianate mansion with tower designed by G A Morell and a later example of suburban mansion originally built in a semi-rural setting in Sydney's inner west. Yaralla, Concord, is an Italianate house built c. 1857-59 with tower. The Second Empire style is more commonly found in public and commercial architecture, including the Sydney Town Hall.

== Description ==
=== Context ===
Shubra Hall is situated within the grounds of Presbyterian Ladies' College (PLC Croydon), which is located on the border and thus within both of the Ashfield and Burwood municipal local government areas, in the inner western suburbs, approximately 11 km from the city centre of Sydney.

=== Shubra Hall ===
Shubra Hall is a grand two-storey mansion dating from 1864, which is designed in the "Victorian Second Empire" architectural style. The centrepiece of a private secondary school campus since 1889 it is now surrounded by school buildings of various ages. The SHR listing encloses the original residential building in its garden setting and including its original stables building.

The general form of Shubra Hall consists of the original two storey residential building facing east, which features well-detailed, high-ceilinged rooms designed for living and entertaining. On the ground floor there were two drawings rooms, a dining room and a breakfast room and on the first floor there were three large bedrooms with anterooms.

On the rear, western side of the building are two service wings extending towards the west. The northern wing is considered to be part of the original 1869 design while the southern wing is thought to have been added by the Coghlan family in the 1880s.The northern wing held the original kitchen, provision rooms and laundry on the ground floor, with servants' bedrooms on the first floor.

The house was finely detailed with costly materials and decorations. The brick walls are rendered inside and out. The exterior decoration includes moulded entablatures and rounded arches and pilasters, to which the architect has added idiosyncratic detailing including Romanesque dentils in the arches, French Renaissance eaves and chimney corbels, and Aesthetic Movement column capitals under the entry arch. The tower has banded patterns of slate. The entry steps are in black slate. The floors of the veranda and entry are elaborately patterned in tessellated tiles.

The interiors are decorated with fine joinery, likely cedar, in the grandly scaled skirtings, doors, windows and the main staircase that has helix-shaped balustrade and newel posts that reference the columns under the entry arch. The joinery is simpler within the service wings and tower. All the cornices are moulded plaster profiles. Decorative cast plaster is featured in the consoles, decorative panels and colonnettes under the arches, and also in the ceiling roses. The ceilings are commonly lath and plaster, but the drawing rooms have a shallow pattern that may be pressed metal. The marble mantelpieces are commonly white, with a dark grey in the dining room, typical of those constructed in Australia using imported stone, coloured tiles and cast iron grates.

=== Stables and gardens ===
The stables are extensively altered within, but retain their external form seen from the east and north.

The gardens retains some typical Victorian period landscape devices. The oval-shaped driveway and garden bed on the east side of the house (not included in the curtilage) give a formal sense of arrival. This shape is repeated in the eastern lawn with its original steps, arranged on an axis from the front door. The massive scale of araucarias is used as landmark planting, featuring Norfolk Island pines. The camphor laurel south-east of the house is likely to have been planted by the Hordern Family. The Victorians' love of exotic plant collections is demonstrated by cold climate trees such as blue deodar cedar, and deciduous trees such as oak (Quercus petraea), elm (Ulmus glabra), which contrast with warm climate plants such as Strelitzia nicolai. The palm groves are typically Victorian as a collection of many species arranged like a tropical forest, but they were likely planted in the Federation period. Key species include jelly palm (Butia capitata), Canary Island palm (Phoenix canariensis), cabbage palm (Livistona australis), Chinese fan palm (Livistona chinensis), kentia and curly palms (Howea forsteriana and Howea belmoreana), Bangalow palm (Archontophoenix cunninghamiana), windmill palm (Tracycarpus fortunei), and California fan palm (Washingtonia filifera).

=== Condition ===
As at 10 September 2014, the house, stables and gardens are in generally good condition. Highly intact to its state at the end of the nineteenth century. There is no visible sign of original service ducting.

=== Modifications and dates ===
- Mid-1880s: Construction of the two-storey southern service wing.
- c. 1890. Construction of PLC school buildings adjacent to Shubra Hall.
- c. 1900: high quality Art Nouveau glasswork installed in the entry doors and side lights at both ends of the entry hall. The reasoning for replacing the glass is unknown. It is thought that perhaps the original glass was broken or it contained imagery unsuited to a Presbyterian school.
- 20th century: Various partitions have been constructed inside to enable the mansion to be used as school offices.
- 1949: The courtyard was redesigned when garden beds were put in limiting the open space available for walking and sitting.
- Early 1980s: Tanner and Cox Architects, working with landscape architect Catherin Bull (an alumnus of the school) conserved buildings and grounds over several years, for example, taking out the garden beds planted in 1949 to allow more space in the courtyard. A new pergola-covered walkway was designed to link the buildings on either side and provide the fourth wall for the quadrangle.
- 1984: James Indsto, a landscape gardener, did a survey of the gardens as part of his studies.
- 1987: Miss Lambie of the Royal Botanic Gardens listed garden specimens.
- 1997: horticulturist Anne Fraser was documenting the gardens.

== Heritage listing ==
As at 10 September 2014, Shubra Hall is of state aesthetic significance as a grand and largely intact example of the Victorian Second Empire style applied to a domestic residence. On an elevated site retaining some views to the harbour from its tower, it retains its relationship with its remnant stables and its garden landscaping which includes elements dating from the late nineteenth century to the present. Shubra Hall also has state significance for its association with the life of Anthony (Tertius) Hordern III, a leading retailer in New South Wales in the mid Victorian period. Together with his brother Samuel, he was responsible for the vigorous expansion of the Hordern department store business. Shubra Hall also has association and social significance for its ongoing association with the Presbyterian Ladies' College (PLC Croydon) for over 120 years.

Shubra Hall was listed on the New South Wales State Heritage Register on 19 December 2014 having satisfied the following criteria.

The place has a strong or special association with a person, or group of persons, of importance of cultural or natural history of New South Wales's history.

Shubra Hall has state significance for its association with the life of Anthony (Tertius) Hordern III, a leading retailer in New South Wales in the mid Victorian period. Together with his brother Samuel, he was responsible for the vigorous expansion of the Hordern department store business. Shubra Hall also has significance for its ongoing association with the Presbyterian Ladies' College at Croydon for over 120 years.

The place is important in demonstrating aesthetic characteristics and/or a high degree of creative or technical achievement in New South Wales.

Shubra Hall is of state aesthetic significance as a grand and largely intact example of the Victorian Second Empire style applied to a domestic residence. On an elevated site retaining some views to the harbour from its tower, it retains its relationship with its remnant stables and its garden landscaping which includes elements dating from the late nineteenth century to the present.

The place has a strong or special association with a particular community or cultural group in New South Wales for social, cultural or spiritual reasons.

Shubra Hall has a special association with the community of the Presbyterian Ladies' College, Croydon. This association reaches the threshold for local listing, but is unlikely to reach the threshold for State listing.

The place has potential to yield information that will contribute to an understanding of the cultural or natural history of New South Wales.

Shubra Hall may have research potential to provide information useful to a study of the Hordern Family, the architecture of Albert Bond, mid-Victorian construction techniques, and the domestic and working life on a large estate. Shubra Hall satisfies this criterion at a local level, but is not so rare as to satisfy this criterion at a state level.

The place is important in demonstrating the principal characteristics of a class of cultural or natural places/environments in New South Wales.

Shubra Hall has state significance as a representative example of a nineteenth-century garden villa estate surviving in what is now the inner-western suburbs of Sydney. It demonstrates the popularity of land along the Redfern-Parramatta Railway for residential development by the wealthy, relieved to be away from the poor conditions then found in the harbour port and city area. With business interests in the central business district, owners could easily access their businesses via the railway. Its subsequent history of being acquired by a private school and adapted to institutional use is also representative of similar nineteenth century NSW estates.

== See also ==
- Australian residential architectural styles
- Presbyterian Ladies' College, Sydney
