= Hordern family =

Australian retail dynasty

Hordern
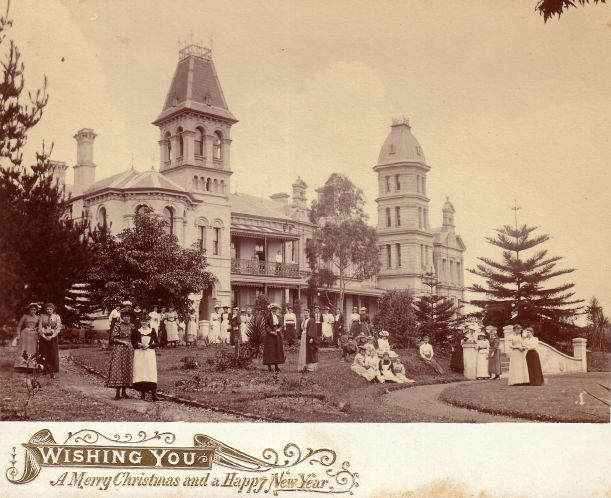
- Shubra Hall in PLC Croydon grounds in 1892, home of Anthony Hordern III.
- Current region: Australia
- Origin: Retford, Nottinghamshire, England
- Members: Anthony Hordern, Snr.; John Hordern; Anthony Hordern, Jnr.; Anthony "Tertius" Hordern, III; Samuel Hordern; Sir Samuel Hordern; Sir Anthony (Tony) Hordern; Samuel "Sam" Hordern
- Connected families: Myer family; Baillieu family
- Traditions: Anglo-Celtic Australian; British; Anglicanism

The Hordern family is an Australian retailing dynasty who established the Anthony Hordern & Sons department store. The Hordern family first came to prominence in Sydney as merchants and retailers, and then gained notability in rural pursuits, stockbreeding, stockbroking, fashion, cricket and parliament. The Hordern name is still seen in Sydney through the naming of the Hordern Pavilion, Hordern Towers within World Square and the Hordern Fountain in memory of Samuel Hordern, in the Sydney suburb of Pyrmont.

== Legacy ==
As wealthy merchants and graziers, members of the extended Hordern family owned and built many important, and now heritage-listed, homes in Sydney and the Southern Highlands of New South Wales. Family homes often carried names such as Retford celebrating the Hordern family links to Retford in Nottinghamshire, England; and Stramshall, the birthplace of Anthony Hordern. Major dwellings are:

- Retford Hall, 19-23 Thornton Street, Darling Point, was built by Anthony Hordern II in 1865 to a design by Edmund Blacket, demolished c1967, now two apartment towers.
- Retford Park, Bowral, was built in 1887 and was owned by three generations of Samuel Horderns until 1960. James Fairfax acquired the property in 1964 and, in 2016, gifted the property to the National Trust of Australia. The old dairy was transformed into an art gallery, Ngununggula (meaning "belonging" in the local Gundungurra language), which opened in October 2021.
- The Highlands, Wahroonga, was commissioned in the 1890s by Alfred James Hordern and was designed by John Horbury Hunt.
- Tuxedo, Strathfield, was an early home of Sir Samuel Hordern and is also thought to have been designed by Horbury Hunt.
- Babworth House, Darling Point, was the second home of Sir Samuel. It was designed by Morrow & de Putron in 1912 and is located in substantial harbourside grounds. In 2004 the house was adapted into five large apartments.
- Jenner House, Potts Point, was originally known as "Stramshall", and was built by Lebbeus Hordern in 1871 to a design by Blacket. It was later added to by Thomas Rowe and is listed by the National Trust of Australia.
- Shubra Hall, Croydon, is the oldest building on the campus of the Presbyterian Ladies' College, Sydney, and was the home of Anthony Hordern III.
- Hopewood House, 13-17 Thornton Street, Darling Point, built c1924 for (Billie) Lebbeus Hordern (1891–1928) on 2.5 acres beside Retford Hall, sold 1930, demolished c1966, now apartment tower and houses. Lebbeus also owned 700-acre Hopewood House in Bowral c1912-30, and stations Touree and Casslin.
- Zanobi, Petersham, was given to Percy Hordern as a wedding present from his family.
- Kalua, Palm Beach, was owned by the Hordern family from its construction in the 1920s until 1978.

== Family tree ==
- Gilbert Hordern (1718-1774) m. Beatrice née Devy
- Anthony Hordern, Snr. (1788 – 9 June 1869) m. Ann née Woodhead (c. 1791 – 18 January 1871) in 1817, migrated to Sydney in 1823, moved to Melbourne in 1839.
  - John (1819 – 27 March 1864) m. Rebecca née Carr (c. 1827 – 15 July 1875) on 5 July 1845. They lived in Charlotte Place, Sydney then "Kingston", Newtown. He is also mentioned as living at O'Connell Town – this may be the same place. He worked in the family business then on his own account from around 1845. He committed suicide with a razor at the Brickfield Hill home of his brother Lebbeus after an extended period of insanity.
    - John Lebbeus Hordern (c. 1848 – 23 February 1910) m. Caroline (– 9 September 1938). He founded Hordern Brothers in Pitt Street. He died of pneumonia in Auckland, New Zealand after being thrown from a horse.
      - Roy Alfred (c. 1892 – 21 December 1935) died after an accident in Perth, Western Australia
      - Bruce Alexander (– 24 June 1943) m. (1) Winifred Frances née Perryman in March 1921, divorced 1931; (2) Ailsa Sylvia née Scholer on 22 July 1937. Home "Kalua" at Palm Beach
    - (Edward) Carr Hordern (1853 – 24 July 1940) m. Frances Lillie née Dryland on 14 October 1885. After a family dispute, he founded in 1922, with his three sons, Hordern Brothers Limited, drapers, "Horderns in Pitt Street". Their home was "Chislehurst", Centennial Avenue Chatswood
      - (Cowra) Stewart Hordern (1891 – c. 10 February 1970) was involved in the family business from 1916.
        - (Samuel) Carr Hordern (1929–2023) was a successful stockbroker and alderman for the City of Sydney, Macquarie Ward 1969 to 1974.
    - Alfred James Hordern (c. 1859 – 15 August 1932) home "Highlands" Myra Street, Wahroonga or Waitara
  - Anthony Jnr. (1819 – 21 August 1876) m. Harriett née Marsden (c. 1820 – 21 January 1872), daughter of one Samuel Marsden Esq. (not the Rev. Samuel Marsden) on 17 July 1841 Homes "Retford Hall" (probably named for his mother's birthplace), Darling Point and 756 George Street. He was an alderman 1868 to 1879.
    - Anthony III "Tertius" (24 July 1842 – 16 September 1886) m. Elizabeth Mary née Bull (c. 1847 – 21 November 1919) on 12 October 1864 Home "Shubra Hall", Croydon later "Drummoyne House", Drummoyne. He left Sydney for Western Australia, where he made his mark as an entrepreneur in association with Sir Julius Vogel and founding the Albany–Beverley "Great Southern" railway and developing much of the surrounding land. He died aboard the steamer R.M.S. Carthage on the Red Sea while returning to Australia after several years conducting his business affairs from London. A memorial to him was erected at the top of York Street, Albany. He was nominated by A. J. H. Saw, the Chancellor of the University of Western Australia, as one of the fifteen greats in the development of the State.
      - Naomi Eveline (9 March 1873 – 1937) m. Colonel R. B. Firman of London
      - Arthur Gilbert (1877–1937) m. Henrietta née Gordon on 5 July 1899.
      - Frieda Elsa (– 1956) m. lawyer A(rthur) Victor Worthington (c. 1871 – December 1928), of Caversham, England on 28 April 1908, lived at Turramurra, then "Jersey", Potts Point.
      - Anthony Shubra Hordern (1879–1934) m. (1) Edith née Campbell on 4 September 1901; (2) May née Brogan
        - Hugh Cecil Shubra (1906–1944) engaged to Marian Seton in May 1936
        - Basil Colin Shubra (1910–1969) was a prominent bank shareholder
      - Miriam Harriet (1878–) m. Claude Thirkell of London on 3 November 1892
    - Harriett (c. 1843 – 24 August 1904) m. Nathaniel George Bull J.P. (1842 – 7 November 1911) on 9 February 1861. They lived at "Cabramatta Park", Cabramatta then "Lugano", Potts Point. Her will was the subject of legal argument. N. G. Bull was three times Mayor of Liverpool and M.L.A. 1885–1887
      - Anthony Hordern Bull (– 20 June 1950) . Gertrude née ??, residence "Merrimba", Beecroft. He was previously engaged to Brenda Banks of "Tudor", Mosman in September 1936. He had a twin, of which no details yet to hand.
      - Harriet "Tinie" Bull (1868 – 22 June 1947) m. William Hordern (1862 – 29 June 1911), a cousin, on 8 June 1887 – see his entry below.
    - Hannah (1846 – 16 September 1884) m. Henry Bull on 29 November 1862
    - Samuel (14 July 1849 – 13 August 1909) m. Jane Maria née Booth (– 19 October 1945) on 11 November 1875; residence Retford Hall, Darling Point.
      - Sir Samuel Hordern (24 September 1876 – 3 June 1956) m. Charlotte Isabel "Lottie" née See (– 30 June 1952) on 14 March 1900; residence "Tuxedo", Strathfield, "Babworth House" Darling Point. She was the eldest daughter of Sir John See.
        - Doreen F. (1901) m. Oscar M. Peall of Marlborough, Wiltshire on 13 March 1935. Doreen was noted as a socialite and ornithologist.
        - (Charlotte) Audrey (1904–) m. writer William A. "Bill" Winter-Irving (1900–1990) on 24 May 1933.
          - Celia Winter-Irving (1941 – 26 July 2009) was an authority on Shona art.
        - Major Samuel "Sam" Hordern OBE (16 May 1909 – 25 July 1960) m. June née Baillieu (11 June 1909 – 1999), youngest daughter of (Richard Percy) Clive Baillieu, of Melbourne on 12 April 1934. Home at Bellevue Hill.
          - Sara June (1935 –) m. Sidney Baillieu Myer (11 January 1926 –) on 15 December 1955, son of Sidney Myer, thus uniting two of Australia's wealthiest families. Sara was, in 1936, described as "Australia's richest baby". Her estate, valued at $20 million, was the subject of litigation.
      - Jane Mabel "Janey" "Dollie" (3 December 1878–1956) m. Leslie Nicholl Walford (1869–1928) on 5 February 1902, divorced 1913. Competitive marksman of Botany Gun Club, father with Dora Alexander (1895–1972) of interior designer Leslie Walford AM (1927–2012).
        - Phyllis Hordern Walford (1903–1953) m. Rupert Will Moses (1898–1966) on 26 February 1925.
          - Pamela Jean Moses (1925–2009) m. Clement Manuel Hornibrook (1919–1990) on 12 March 1948, son of Sir Manuel Hornibrook.
          - Prudence Mary Moses (1931–1987) m. James Selby Robson-Scott (1930–1978) on 14 May 1953.
      - Harriet (9 August 1880–1945)
      - Minnie Sarah (1882 – 15 August 1931) m. (1) (William Walker) Russell Watson (– 1924) on 7 November 1904; (2) Dr. Herbert Vivian Holdern (10 February 1883 – 17 June 1938), a cousin, in 1930.
      - John Booth Hordern (15 May 1884 –), was written out of his father's will.
      - Sir Anthony (Tony) Hordern (21 February 1889 – 18 April 1970) m. (1) Viola Sydney née Bingham (– 14 February 1929) on 27 February 1911. Viola was a niece of the Chief Justice of Victoria, Sir John Madden; (2) (Ursula) Mary née Bullmore (1 April 1911 – 1961) on 3 March 1932. Mary was fashion editor of Australian Women's Weekly. Their home was Retford Hall, Darling Point.
        - Dinah Bingham Hordern was engaged to Henry John Marks in April 1935
  - Elizabeth (1821–1906) m. James S(tewart) Dismorr (1821–1895) in 1844, lived in Gravesend, Kent.
  - Lebbeus (1826 – 1 November 1881) died in Naples en route to Australia
  - Mary Ann (1829 – 19 April 1872) m. Robert Clowes. They lived at Lebbeus's home "Stramshall", Potts Point.
    - Mary Ann Rebecca (– 1926) m. John Stewart Dismorr of London on 30 April 1874.
  - William (1831 – 8? 9? October 1881) m. Cecilia née Monger (c. 1835 – 8 December 1914) and lived in Melbourne, home in 1873 "Stramshall", Victoria Parade, East Melbourne and in 1887 family lived in "Stramshall" on Burwood Road, later Auburn Road, Hawthorn.
    - William Hordern (1862 – 29 June 1911) m. Harriet "Tinie" née Bull (1868 – 22 June 1947), a cousin, on 8 June 1887, lived at "Cabramatta", Riversdale Road, later Princess Street, Kew, Victoria. William, solicitor of 339 Collins Street, was appointed a commissioner of the Supreme Court of South Australia in 1903
      - (Harriet) May Hordern (11 March 1888 – 5 May 1951) m. Rev. Nigel a'Beckett Talworth Backhouse, Major-Chaplain AIF (18 April 1888 – 26 December 1966) on 10 December 1919. Nigel was chaplain at The Shore School.
    - Lebbeus Hordern m. Louie Dewson née Smith on 25 May 1887, lived at Hawthorn, Victoria then "Pontefract", Balwyn, had daughters 18 September 1889, 7 September 1894, sons 28 February 1908, 4 April 1914
  - Edward (1838 – 14 August 1883) m. (1) Emily Jane née Grose (c. 1842 – 19 December 1865) on 8 February 1860; (2) Christiana Matilda Stack (– 24 April 1904) on 17 November 1866. They lived at 676 George Street South, Brickfield Hill, Sydney then "Milton House", Darlinghurst Road, then "Chatsworth", Potts Point. He was an alderman 1879 to 1882.
    - Edward Hordern (20 April 1861 – 27 May 1913) m. Elizabeth Jane Scantlebury (10 February 1866 – 10 June 1947) on 30 April 1884.
    - Percy Grose Hordern MLC (1 January 1864 – 1 April 1926) m. Annie Wright (1865 – 8 June 1939) on 17 February 1885. He was a Labor Party member of the New South Wales Legislative Council between 1921 and 1926.
    - Cecilia Matilda (1870–1942) m. Frank Mallon McElhone (27 June 1866 – 10 July 1925) on 6 November 1886.
    - Florence Amelia Hordern (1873–1912) m. Captain Christian Martin Crone Rovsing R.E. K.C.B. (14 November 1858 – 16 January 1930) on 2 April 1897 Rovsing was consulting engineer to the King of Siam.
    - Cecil (c. 1868 – 14 September 1931) m. Eva Connell née Laycock OBE on 26 August 1889, home at "Ripley Lodge", Elamang Avenue, Kirribilli. Cecil was partner with Mr. H. H. McNall in the firm of McNall and Hordern and was a respected member of the Sydney Stock Exchange. In recognition of her work for the Red Cross Society during World War I, Eva was awarded an OBE in 1920 and the Tip Tree Red Cross Convalescent Home for women at Strathfield was renamed Eva Hordern Home in 1943 in recognition of her work for Red Cross during World War II.
    - Beatrice Maude (– 16 February 1953) m. John Patrick Garvan Sheridan, a barrister and later Justice Garvan Sheridan, (c. 1869 – 5 September 1938) on 9 January 1901. They divorced in 1918. She remarried, to Baron Henri de Tuyll in 1930.
      - Beatrice Garvan Sheridan m. Lieutenant-Commander Mortimer Durand RN (retired) in 1931.
    - Dr. Herbert Vivian Hordern (10 February 1883 – 17 June 1938) m. (1) Norah Ebsworth née White (1892 – 6 July 1938) in 1913. They separated in 1923 and were divorced in 1929. She died as the result of a motor vehicle accident. (2) Minnie Sarah née Hordern (1882 – 15 August 1931), a cousin and daughter of Samuel and Jane Maria Hordern (see above), in 1930.

== Gallery ==
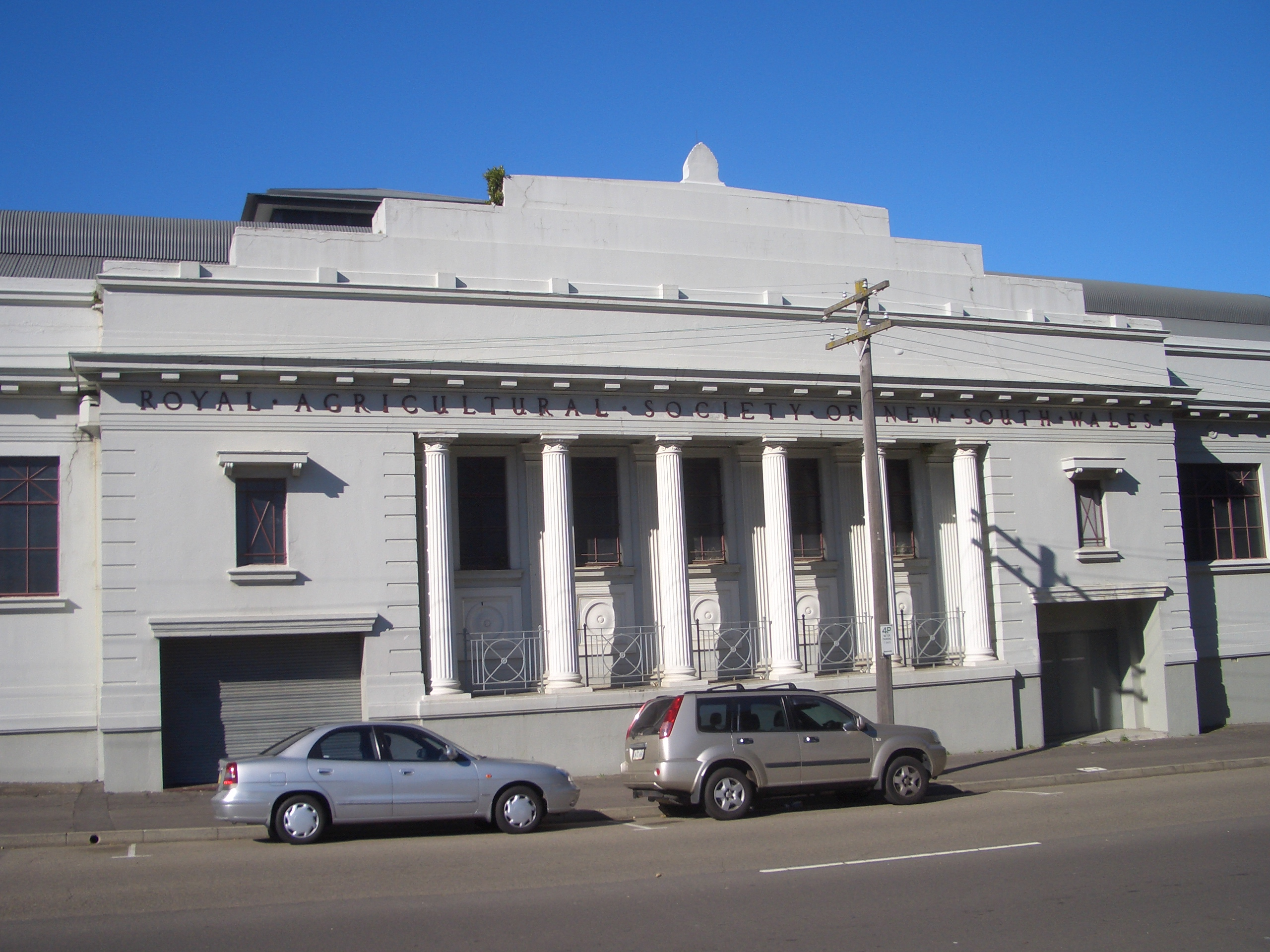
The Hordern Pavilion, Moore Park

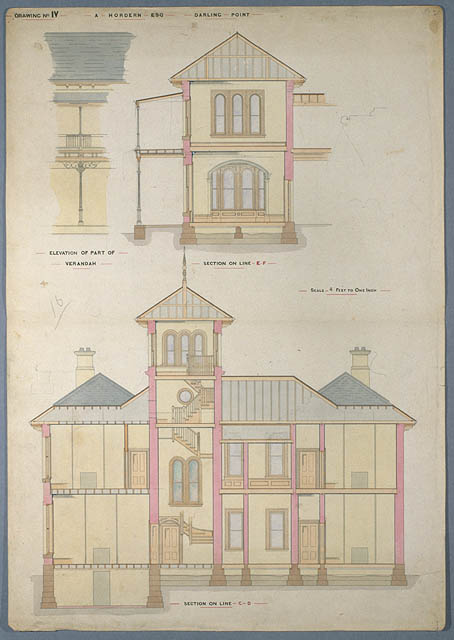
Plans for Retford Hall, Darling Point

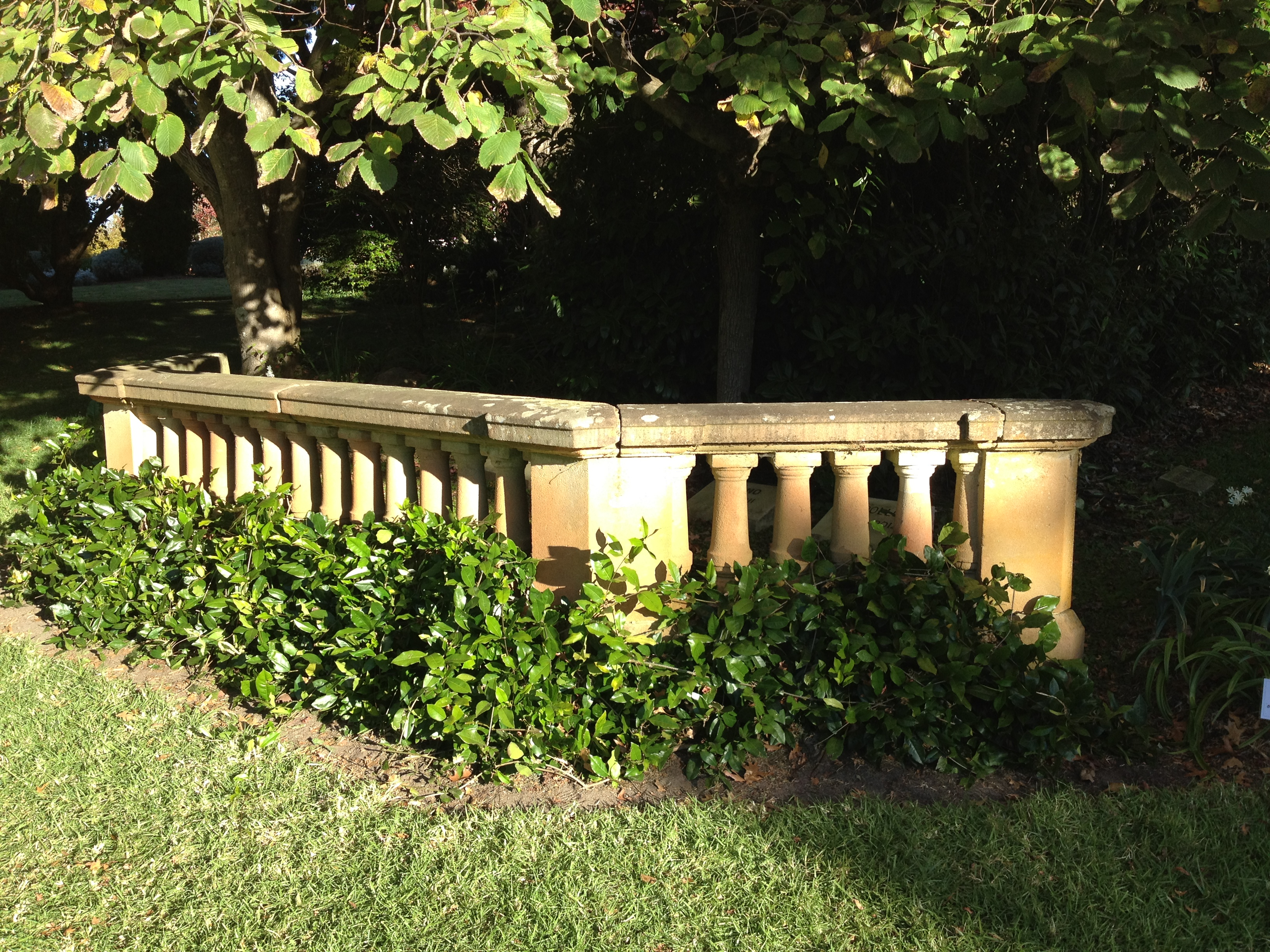
The stone balustrade from the demolished Retford Hall, Darling Point, is now in the garden of Retford Park, Bowral

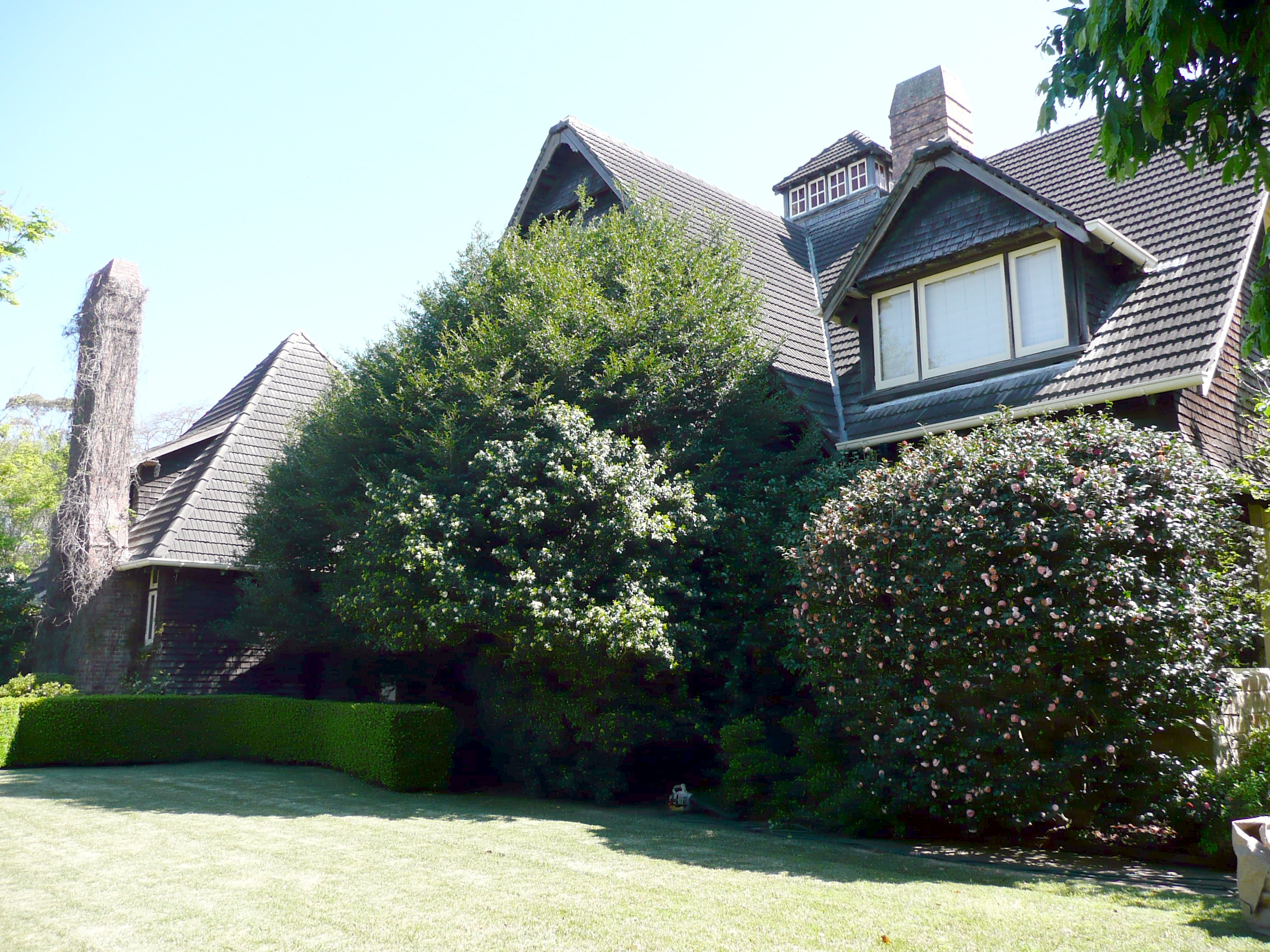
The Highlands, Wahroonga

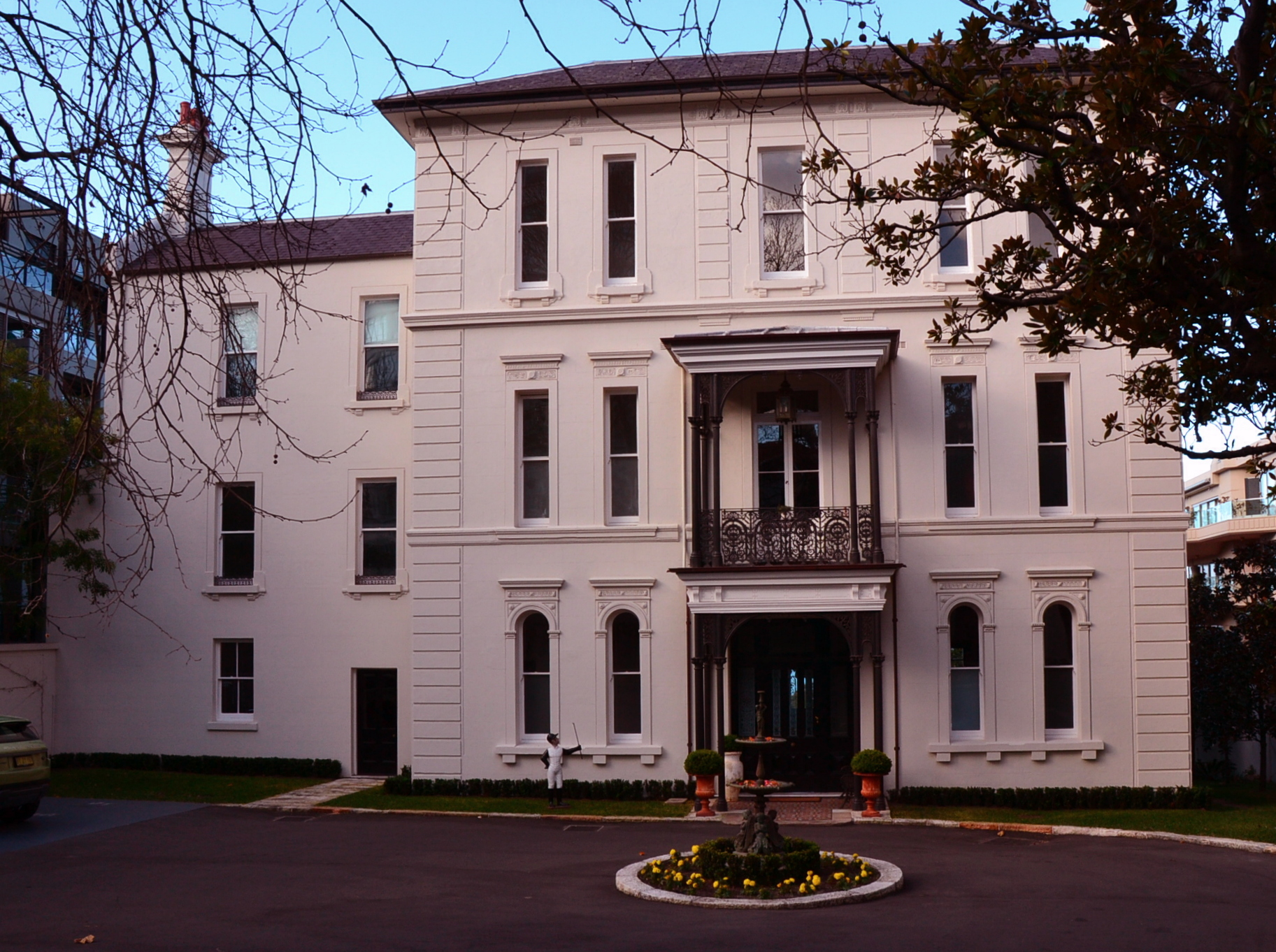
Jenner House, Potts Point

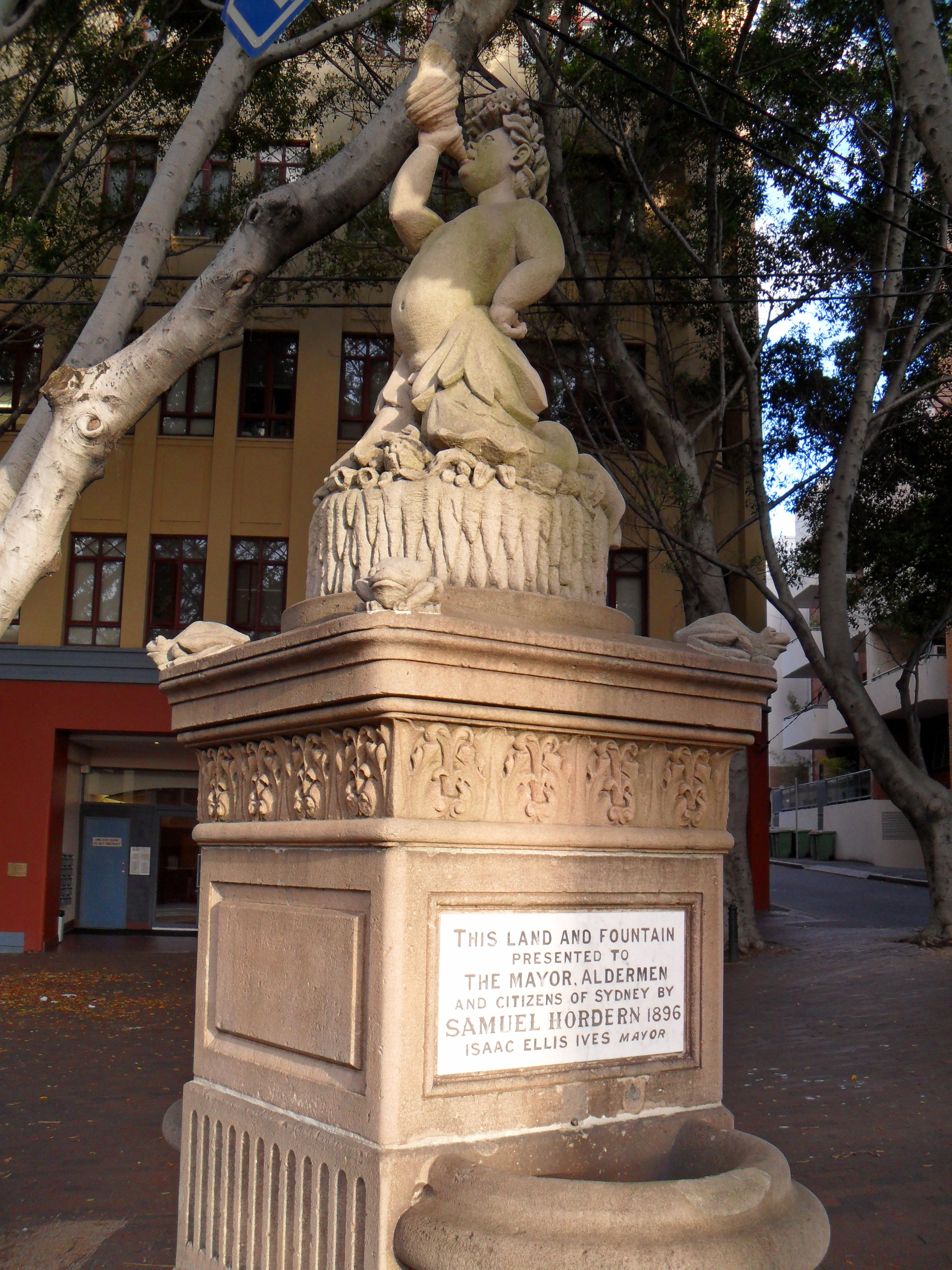
Hordern Fountain, Sydney

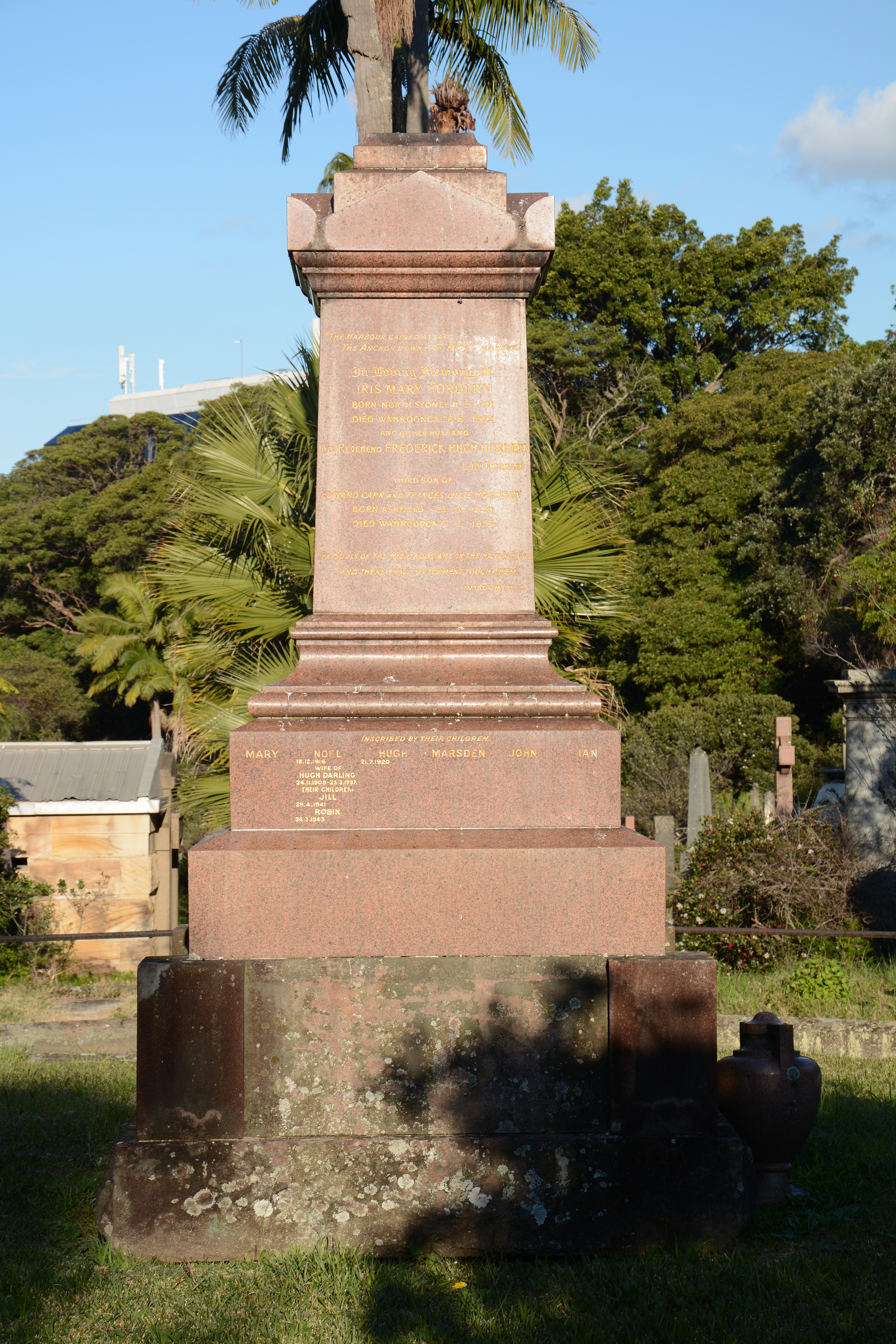
Hordern family grave in Gore Hill Cemetery, St Leonards, New South Wales
