= Anthony Hordern & Sons =

Department store in Sydney, Australia

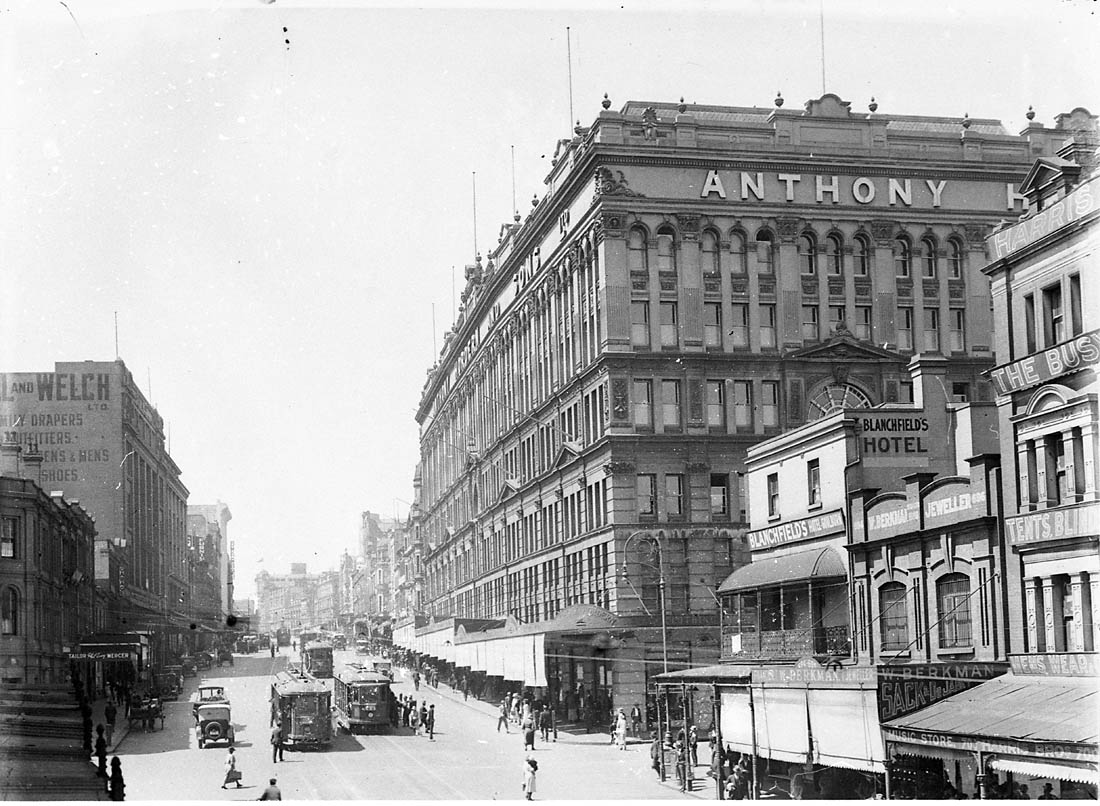
- Type: Public company
- Traded as: Anthony Hordern's (1823–1966); Hordern's (1966–1973)
- Industry: Retail
- Founded: 1823; 203 years ago
- Founder: Anthony Hordern
- Defunct: February 1973; 53 years ago
- Fate: Acquired by Waltons
- Headquarters: Sydney, Australia
- Number of locations: Brickfield Hill (1905–1966, Horderns HomeWorld from 1966 to 1970); Mid City Pitt Street (1963–1973 – serving as the company's flagship store, leaving the Brickfield Hill store to deal with homewares only from July 1966 – a former Hordern Bros. store); Canberra (1956–1963); Wollongong (1960–1972); Goulburn (1960–1970); West Ryde (1959–1969)
- Key people: Sir Samuel Hordern, Governing Director 1909–26
- Products: Department Store
- Owner: Waltons (1969–1973)
- Divisions: Hordern's Homeworld (Brickfield Hill, 1966–1970)

Anthony Hordern & Sons was a major department store in Sydney, New South Wales, Australia. With 52 acres (21 hectares) of retail space, Anthony Hordern's was once the largest department store in the world. The historic Anthony Hordern building, which was located on a block bounded by George Street, Liverpool, Pitt and Goulburn Streets, on what was a small hill called Brickfield Hill in the Sydney central business district, was controversially demolished in 1986 to make way for the World Square development.

== History ==
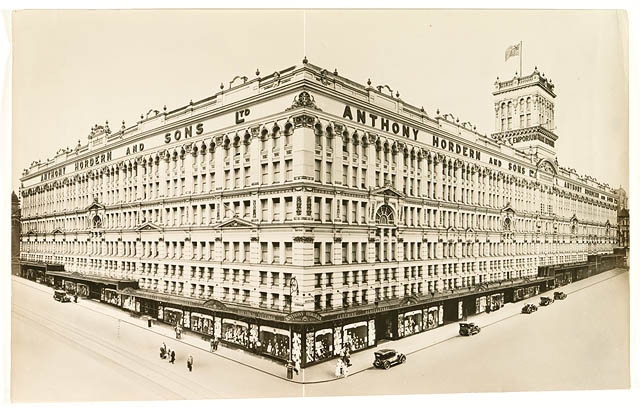
The Palace Emporium

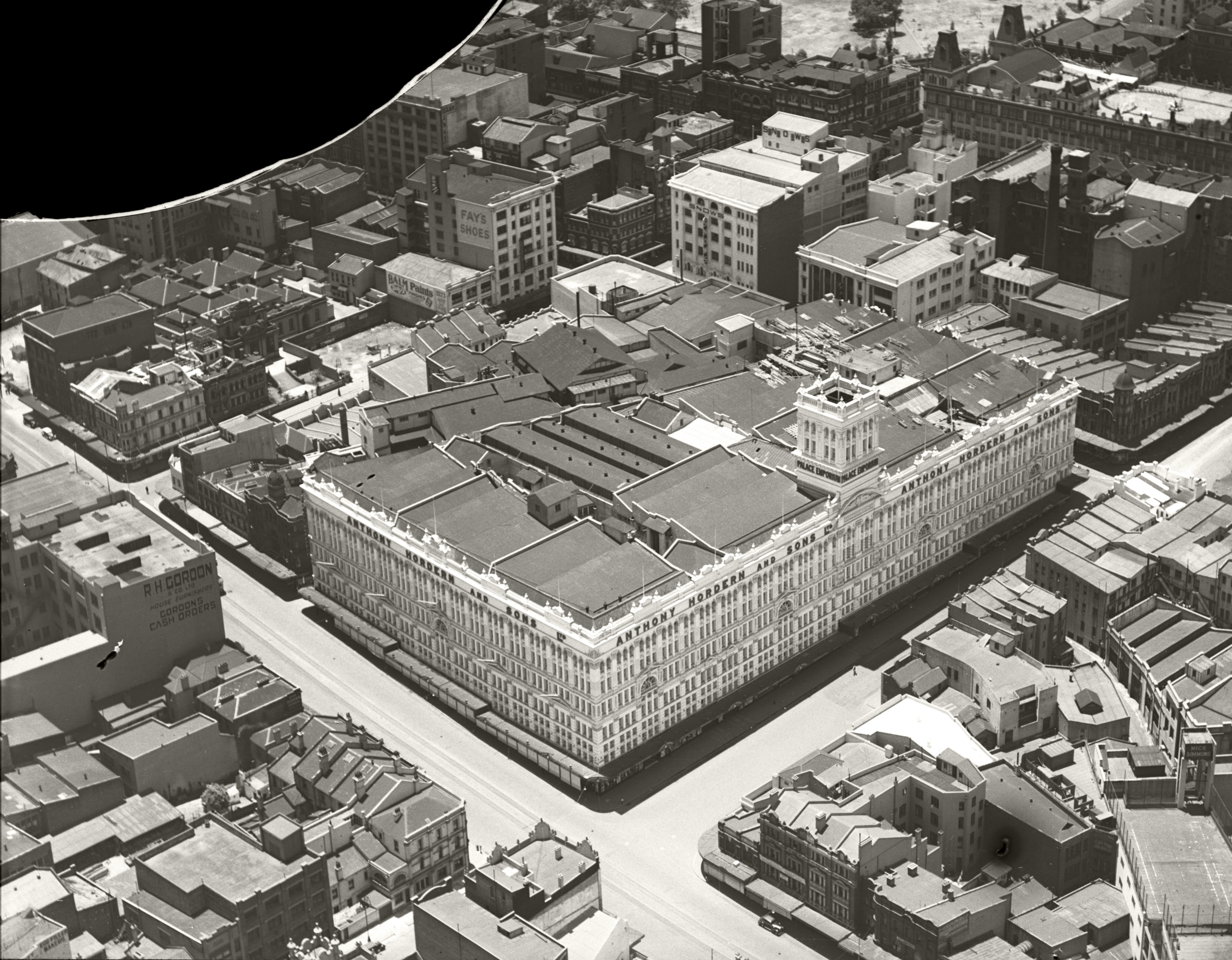
The Anthony Hordern Palace Emporium was once the largest department store in the world

The business was originally established by a free immigrant from England, Anthony Hordern, in 1823, as a drapery shop. He was the founding member of the Hordern family in Australia. A further large menswear store was in upper George Street, and Hordern's also operated one of the largest mail order businesses in Australia. The business remained in family hands for a century, and a substantial six-storey building was opened by them in 1905, called The Palace Emporium, the main entrance being completely fitted out in imported Italian marble. The store was located on the corner of George, Pitt and Goulburn Streets in the south end of the CBD. One of its advertising slogans was that it sold "anything from a needle to an anchor". The crest on their coat of arms was a budding tree, the motto: "While I live I'll grow". It appeared above all the store's window fittings and on all its stationery.

=== Early years: Anthony Hordern senior ===
Anthony Hordern sen. (1788–1869) came from Staffordshire, where his family was prominent in Wolverhampton banking circles. He and his wife Ann (ca.1791–1871) and four children arrived in Sydney on the Phoenix on 6 August 1823 (one reference has 16 June 1824) and set up a drapery business "Mrs. Hordern's" at 12 King Street, between Pitt and Castlereagh Streets on the eastern corner of Terry Lane (later Truth Lane); (He may have initially set up as a coachbuilder.) An advertisement for her shop in the Sydney Morning Herald of 3 April 1834, is said to have been the first display advertisement in any Australian newspaper. They moved to Melbourne in 1839, and Anthony jun. (1819–1876) found employment as a cabinetmaker, but was shortly to return to Sydney. Anthony Hordern senior remained in Melbourne, living at 86 Russell Street. His son William (1831–1881) also remained in Melbourne.

=== Expansion: Anthony Hordern junior ===
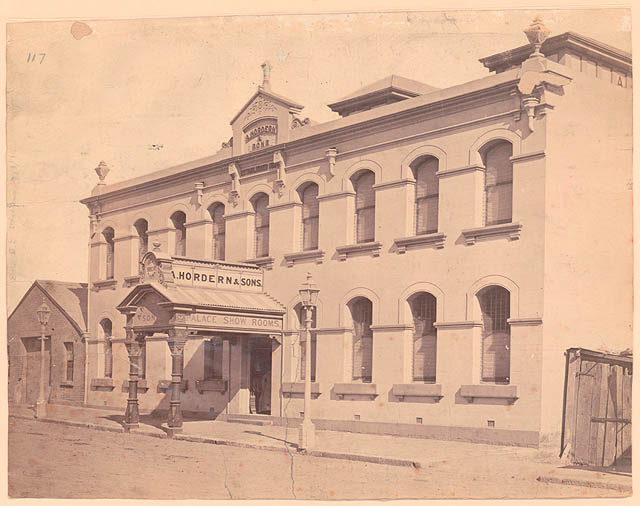
A. Hordern and Sons, Palace Show Rooms, George St, Haymarket, c. 1878

In 1842 Anthony jun. purchased a block of land by the corner of George Street and Charlotte Place and in 1844 he and his brother Lebbeus set up business as L. & A. Hordern at 689 George Street, Brickfield Hill. Anthony jun., his wife, and family lived above the store and it was there that Samuel Hordern (1849 – 1909) was born. They purchased the site for a second store at 557 (later renumbered to 756) George Street, Haymarket. The King Street shop was closed by Anthony Hordern sen. in 1845, leaving John (1819–1864) running the Lower George Street shop "Nottingham House" and Anthony jun. running the Brickfield Hill shop. Lebbeus and Anthony dissolved their partnership in 1855 with Lebbeus setting up business for himself in 489 George Street.

In 1856 the new three-storey Haymarket store was opened and Anthony jun. took his elder son Anthony III (1842–1886) into partnership as Anthony Hordern and Son. In 1869 Samuel (ca.1849–1909) was admitted to the partnership and the business was renamed Anthony Hordern and Sons. Anthony III and Samuel expanded the business vigorously. "The Warehouse" and the "Palace Emporium" were built and put into operation in remarkable time.

Anthony Hordern III ("Anthony Tertius") (1842–1886) left Sydney for Western Australia, where he made his mark as a railway entrepreneur. He died aboard the steamer R.M.S. Carthage while returning to Australia after several years conducting his business affairs from London.

With Anthony's death, Samuel became sole owner of Anthony Hordern and Sons Ltd, and under his control the business continued to expand, as did his personal wealth. Anthony's share of the business was however not disposed of by dissolution of the partnership, a fact that was the subject of a considerable legal tussle. Samuel Hordern argued that the sum of £158,232/15/10d paid to Anthony Hordern junior's estate was the outcome of a fair stocktaking and was accepted by his trustees. This view was shared by the Privy council and an appeal was rejected. The principal claimants, sons Anthony Shubra Hordern (1879–1934) and Arthur Gilbert Hordern (1877–1937), who were business associates based in England, were also subjected to an injunction preventing them using "Anthony Hordern" in their trading name.

=== New Palace Emporium ===
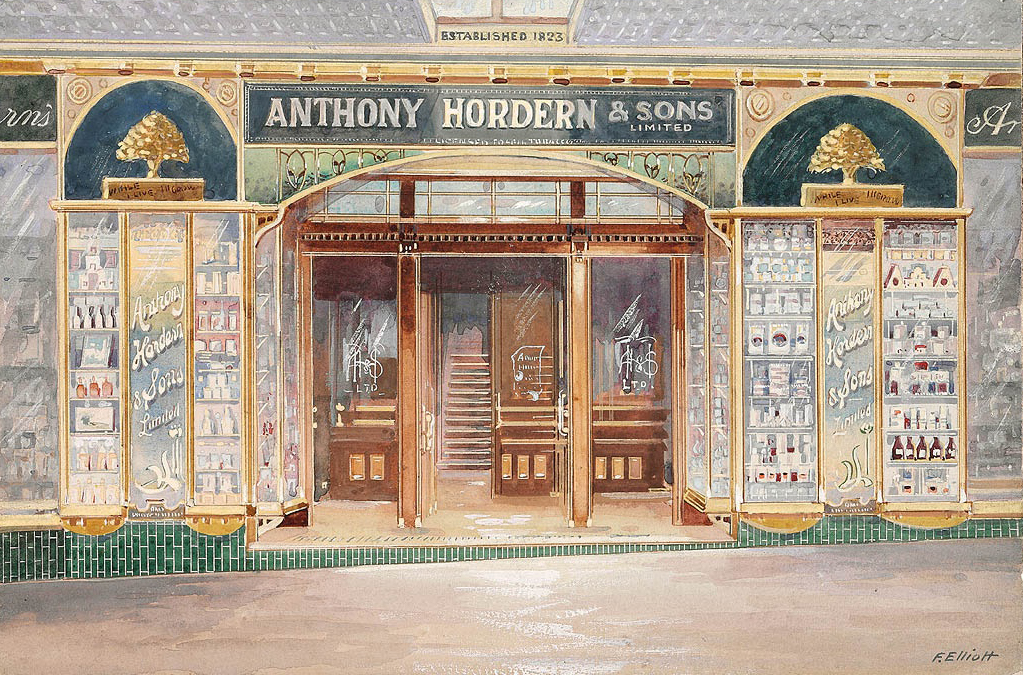
Store entrance, Anthony Hordern and Sons, Sydney, 1933–1936

On 10 July 1901 the Haymarket premises was destroyed by fire. Business was resumed almost immediately in the Exhibition Building, Prince Alfred Park, and a new building "New Palace Emporium" or "Senior Store" erected on the site of the original Brickfield Hill store in 1905. A further storey was added a few years later. In 1912 the business was sold to a private limited liability company with Samuel Hordern jun. as governing director. Samuel Hordern jun. was knighted in 1919.

The New Palace Emporium offered a range of services to attract and keep customers. These included a branch of the Commonwealth Bank, Tea rooms, a post and parcels office, rest rooms, public phone booths, and a Thomas Cook & Son travel agency.

The company established factories across Sydney which produced a diverse range of items from clothes and baked goods to pressed metal ceilings.

Anthony Hordern & Sons produced general catalogues from 1894 to 1935 to tap into the country market and mail order trade. These catalogues were distinctively bound in red cloth.

Several staff social clubs were organised. The Hordernian Dramatic Society ("The Hordernians") achieved some stage successes in the 1920s–1930s, as did the Hordernian Musical Society, led by Frederick Mewton and from 1926 Arnold R. Mote; also teams competing in cricket, women's hockey and rifle shooting.

=== Other Hordern family businesses ===
Other sons of Arthur and Ann had their own drapery businesses in competition with Anthony and Samuel: John left Anthony Hordern & Sons around 1922 and with his sons John Lebbeus (1848–1910), Edward Carr (1853–1940) and Alfred James (ca.1859–1932) founded Hordern Brothers Limited, "Horderns in Pitt Street". Lebbeus (1826–1881) was originally in partnership with Anthony, then alone from 1855 at 489 George Street. John joined him for a while, then Edward, at 676 George Street South (near Liverpool Street) from around 1870; Edward bought out his brother and the partnership was dissolved in 1875.

=== Public company ===
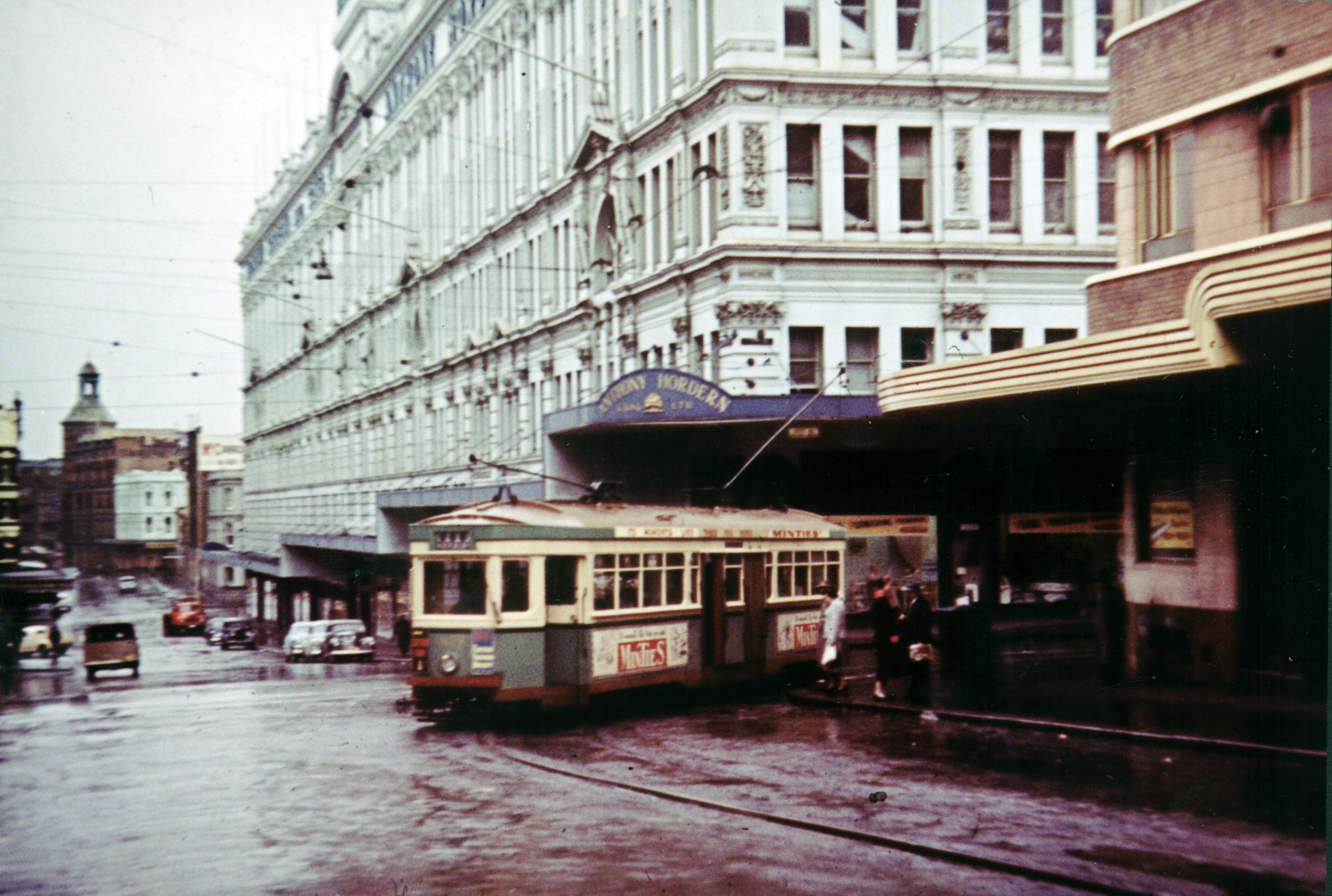
The southern end of Palace Emporium in 1953. The tram is turning into Goulburn St from Pitt St.

In April 1926 the mostly family owned business was sold to a public company set up for the purpose for £2.9 million, the highest sum paid for an Australian business to that date. The sale was approved by governing director Sir Samuel Hordern, with Sir Mark Sheldon appointed chairman, and Justly Rawlings promoted from general manager to managing director of the new company.

In 1966 Anthony Hordern & Sons combined under one general management with Hordern Bros.

=== Demise of Anthony Hordern's city store and retailing ===
On 6 December 1960, Anthony Horderns opened a store in Keira Street, Wollongong. The store included automatic opening doors, an escalator to the second floor and roof top parking for 160 vehicles. The company's logo was paved in grey and green/brown toned terrazzo at the store's front door. This tile is now part of the collection of the Illawarra Museum. The store traded for nine years before becoming a Waltons store and closing in July, 1972. The building was used by Norman Ross before passing to Bing Lee. The building was redeveloped by the GPT Group in 2008.

Anthony Horderns also opened a store in West Ryde. It was a Waltons store from 1970 to 1987. It then became a Norman Ross store and today the site is West Ryde Marketplace with a Woolworths supermarket as anchor tenant.

By the early 1960s Anthony Hordern and Sons began to accumulate yearly losses instead of profits. By 1965/66, this had become noticeable and restructuring was underway. Most notable were the losses from the Brickfield Hill Flagship store and the Anthony Hordern store in Wollongong. A number of the upper levels of the Brickfield Hill store were closed, as the management of Anthony Hordern's tried to restructure the business.

By mid-1969, the situation had not improved and the situation was dire. Things had come to a head and drastic action was needed. Waltons launched a bid for the retail operations of Anthony Hordern, whilst Stocks and Holdings Ltd, launched a bid for the significant Anthony Hordern city Brickfield Hill site.

=== Takeover by Walton's ===
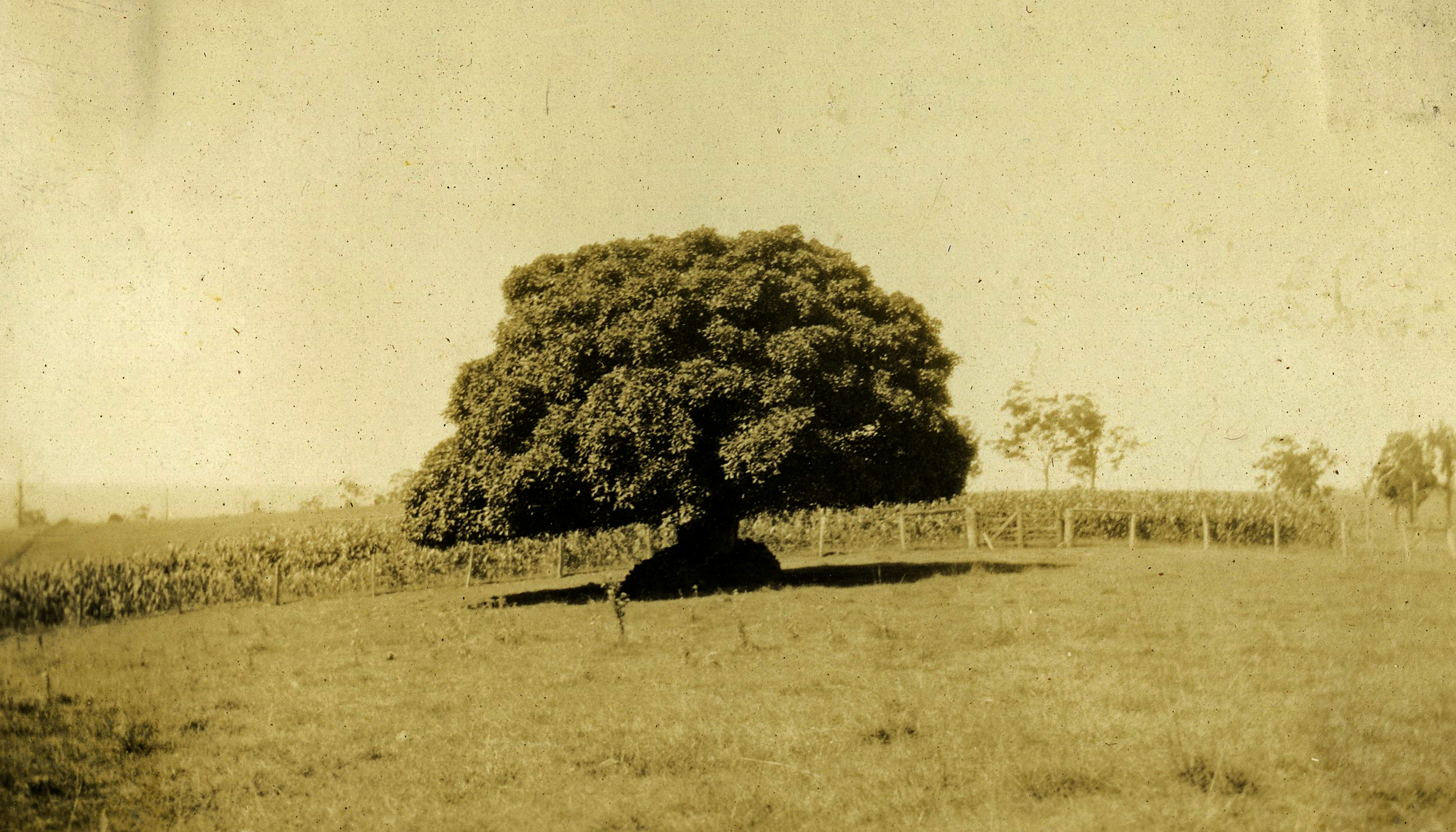
The Port Jackson fig, on the Hordern estate at Camden, that inspired the company crest (actually showing an oak tree) and the motto "While I live, I'll grow."

Despite some counterbidding from Buckingham's Holdings Ltd, Walton's succeeded in gaining control of Anthony Hordern and Sons Ltd by 6 January 1970.

After the takeover of Anthony Hordern's by Walton's, the Brickfield Hill site was then sold to Stocks and Holdings Ltd, for $8.5 million. It turned out Stocks and Holdings Ltd were acting for their client, The State Superannuation Trust. It was then leased back by The Superannuation Trust, to Stocks and Holdings Ltd, for retail space. This was completed by Christmas Eve 1969, ending 64 years of retail pioneering and ownership of the building by Anthony Hordern's Ltd, even though the Brickfield Hill store had already transferred most of its functions to the Mid-City store on Pitt Street by this time, focusing on home furnishings and appliances instead as a Hordern's Homeworld store.

The development of American-style suburban shopping malls during the later 1960s, coupled with fiercer competition in the city and a lax attitude towards heritage buildings, is said to have sealed the fate of the store. The Port Jackson fig tree on the Hordern family's estate at Camden, upon which idea of the crest was based, was merely vandalised, having been poisoned in 1966, and did not "die soon afterwards" but was rescued and looked after and is still growing in its pride of position today on Razorback Mountain, surrounded by a fence thus ensuring its enduring security. For many years the building stood idle, and eventually part of it was made into a car park.

== Hordern Brothers ==
Hunter and Ross Hordern, grandsons of Edward Carr Hordern, founded a new family business under the name of Horden Brothers in Windsor. It was operating until at least 1986 and sold hardware, manchester, haberdashery and clothing. It included old glass top display cabinets and a HCF agency in the back corner.

== Management ==
=== Family ownership ===
- Anthony Hordern II, 1844–1876
- Anthony Hordern III, 1876–1886
- Samuel Hordern, Governing Director 1886–1909
- Sir Samuel Hordern, Governing Director 1909–1926

=== Chairmen ===
- Sir Mark Sheldon, 1926–1947
- Septimus Rowe, 1947–1959
- Sir Ronald Irish, 1959–1967
- Frank Munro, 1967–1969

=== Managing directors ===
- Justly Rawlings, 1921–1936

== Legacy ==
The Anthony Hordern Brickfield Hill site, Palace Emporium, was subsequently used by the NSW Institute of Technology (now UTS) for some years. It (and surrounding buildings) was controversially demolished in 1987 for the World Square development, which remained a hole in the ground for nearly twenty years, before finally being completed in 2004.

Originally, in the early 1980s the building's new owner, Singapore based Ipoh Garden Development, planned to try to save the Anthony Hordern's building, but in the end it was found to be too costly after receiving independent advice from the CSIRO, on the state of the buildings concrete and other fittings. Ipoh Garden, however did refurbish the Queen Victoria Building back to heritage standard.

There are still some legacies left in Sydney, such as the Hordern Pavilion, Hordern Towers (within the World Square development), and the Presbyterian Ladies' College in Croydon of which its oldest building, 'Shubra Hall' was the home of Anthony Hordern III until 1889.

== See also ==
- Mark Foy's
- Queen Victoria Building

== Links as sources ==
- adb.online.anu.edu.au
- http://www.gabr.net.au/biogs/ABE0006b.htm
