= Highlands, Wahroonga =

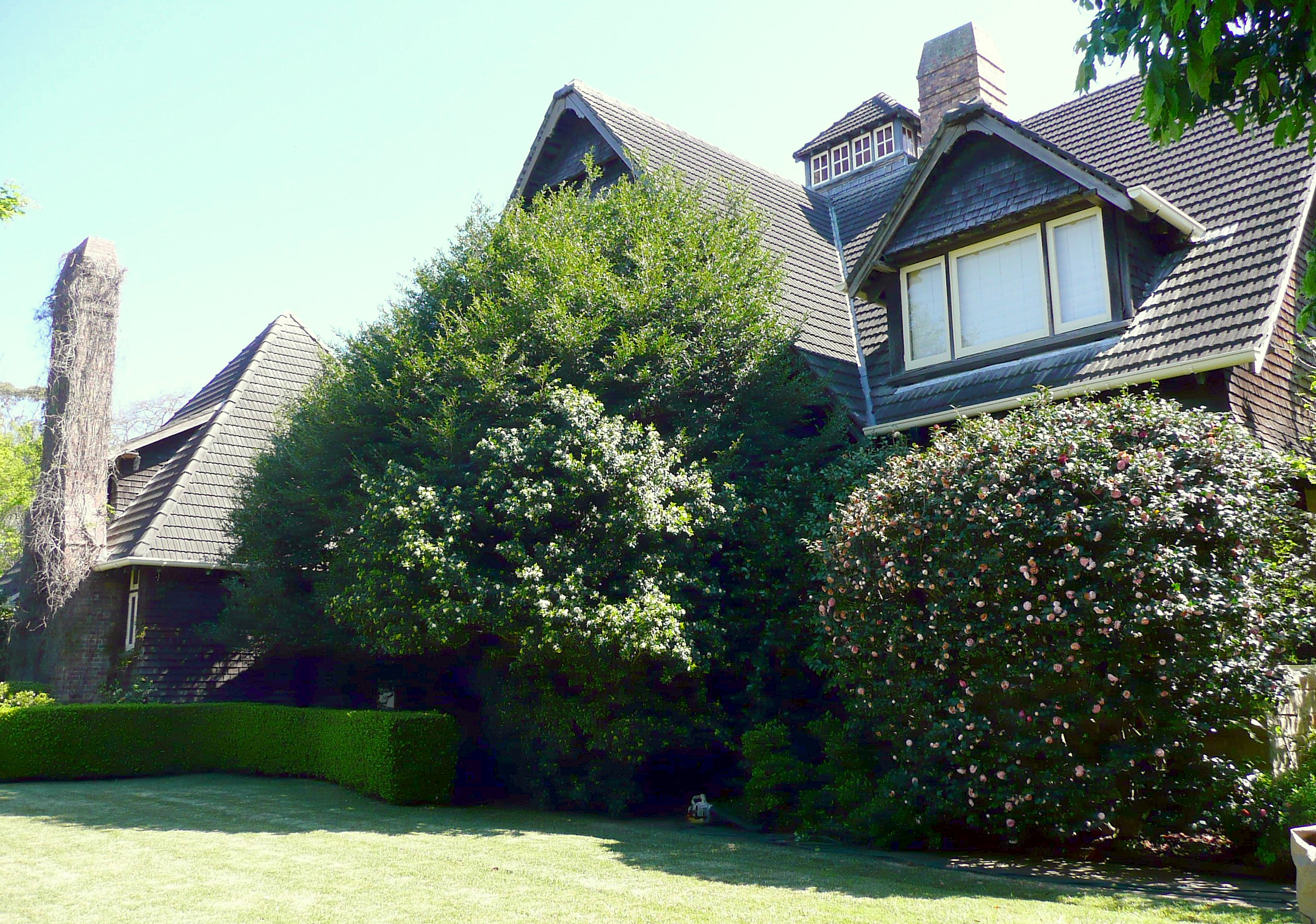
- Highlands, in January 2014.

- Location within Sydney Location within Australia
- 33°42′42″S 151°06′39″E
- Location: 9 Highlands Avenue, Wahroonga, Hornsby Shire, New South Wales, Australia

History
- Built: 1890–1893
- Built for: Alfred James Hordern

Site notes
- Architect: John Horbury Hunt

New South Wales Heritage Register
- Official name: Highlands
- Type: State heritage (built)
- Designated: 2 April 1999
- Reference no.: 34
- Type: House
- Category: Residential buildings (private)

Highlands is a heritage-listed private residence located at 9 Highlands Avenue, Wahroonga, New South Wales, a suburb of Sydney, Australia. It was designed by John Horbury Hunt and built from 1890 to 1893. It was added to the New South Wales State Heritage Register on 2 April 1999.

== History ==
The Highlands was built for Alfred James Hordern, a retail merchant, and his wife, Caroline. During the construction of Highlands the couple lived in a small cottage close to the construction site. It was in this cottage that their first son was born, Alfred Roy. Their second son, Bruce Alexander, was born six years later.

Alfred (1859–1932) married Caroline Doig (1870–1938) in 1890. Caroline was the daughter of Alexander, a planter in Levaka, Fiji, where she was born. Plans for Highlands would have already been drawn up or the house may already have been under construction. Caroline obviously had a hand in the plans. Lesley Horden said of Alfred that "There is nothing in his letters to suggest he had the aestheticism or the spirit of innovation which would move him to commission such an architect. He was not a man to take risks or flout convention, and the robust and distinctive style of this house... bears little relation to his nervous personality." Caroline, however, is described as an artistic and well-educated woman, attributes reflected in Highlands. Other evidence of her influence of the plans is the second kitchen, located next to the household kitchen, which allowed her to "indulge in a culinary orgy." For Caroline, cooking was a creative outlet and was not for the purpose of feeding her family. Once her masterpieces had been formed they were given to local hospitals to feed patients.

The garden was also created and maintained by Caroline, with the help of up to 14 gardeners. The original garden, how much modified, featured colour. Of note was the gravel driveway bordered by hydrangeas, in 1931 the garden was said to contain 100 varieties. Another feature was a 6.4-metre-long (21 ft) bed of lily-of-the-valley. The garden was not just ornamental, there were extensive kitchen garden beds and, in 1903, Caroline had a grape house constructed. She was also an avid collector and would bring back exotics from her travels in the Pacific Islands and Europe. This had its down side, it is said she introduced a weed of the Oxalidaceace family to Australia.

The Alfred junior and Bruce may not have maintained the house as when it was purchased by Mr and Mrs Norman Jones in 1948 it was in a dilapidated state. The Jones replaced the shingle roof with concrete tiles in the 1960s as part of the restoration.

== Description ==
This distinctive two-storey house comprises two conjoining components. The prominent part is the house proper, the kitchen wing sits a separate pyramidal roof. The separation of these two functional centres was advanced for its time. Both roofs were originally shingled, like the walls. The wall shingles curve out over verandahs and openings, to shed water away from the walls. This is a feature of several of Hunt's Shingle Style houses. The verandahs are supported by massive timber posts, minimally decorated. The verandahs are recessed under the eves, another design element commonly used by Hunt.

Internally, a small stair hall opens into the sitting room on the right and the drawing room on the left. The drawing room was formerly a dining room. Behind the hall was originally Mrs. Hordern's kitchen, but has since been converted into the dining room.

The bedrooms on the second floor open off the stairwell, with the verandah facing north off the main bedroom.

Extensive alterations have been made to the kitchen wing. This wing contains a feature not seen in Hunt's other houses - a wide half-glass door. Reynolds and Hughes describe "the structural brace is treated as a glazing member, to which the normal glazing bars are subservient."

The chimney stack is another unusual feature, "a tall, buttressed slab of brickwork which appears almost freestanding." Externally, the original roof shingles have been replaced by grey roof tiles.

The main framing, including window openings is of NSW hardwood, while the window sashes and doors are cedar.

The house was originally situated on 13.6 hectares (34 acres), but subdivisions have left it on a substantially smaller allotment, with the rear of the house to the street.

The garden, although significantly altered, contains a notable period Hoop Pine and provides a sympathetic setting to the house.

== Heritage listing ==
As at 20 September 2006, Highlands was a fine example of John Horbury Hunt's interpretation of the Shingle Style. The house displays many of the elements common to Hunt's Shingle Style houses, including recessed verandahs and sweeping skirts to deposit water well away from the walls. In contrast to these common elements, Highlands also displays several unusual features, a half-glass door and distinctive chimney stack being the most prominent.

Highlands is significant as evidence of women shaping architecture. Mrs Caroline Hordern was a keen cook and the two-storey kitchen wing was heavily influenced by her. The landscaping was also of her creation and Mrs. Horden introduced many exotics from the Pacific Islands to adorn the garden.

Highlands was listed on the New South Wales State Heritage Register on 2 April 1999 having satisfied the following criteria.

The place is important in demonstrating the principal characteristics of a class of cultural or natural places/environments in New South Wales.

Highlands is representative of John Horbury Hunt's interpretation of the Shingle Style. While each of Hunt's houses has distinctive elements, Highlands displays features common to his Shingle Style houses, namely recessed verandahs and shingles sweeping away from openings to carry water away.

Highlands is currently the only Shingle Style house of this scale on the State Heritage Register.

== See also ==
- Australian residential architectural styles
