= World Square =

Shopping centre in Sydney, Australia

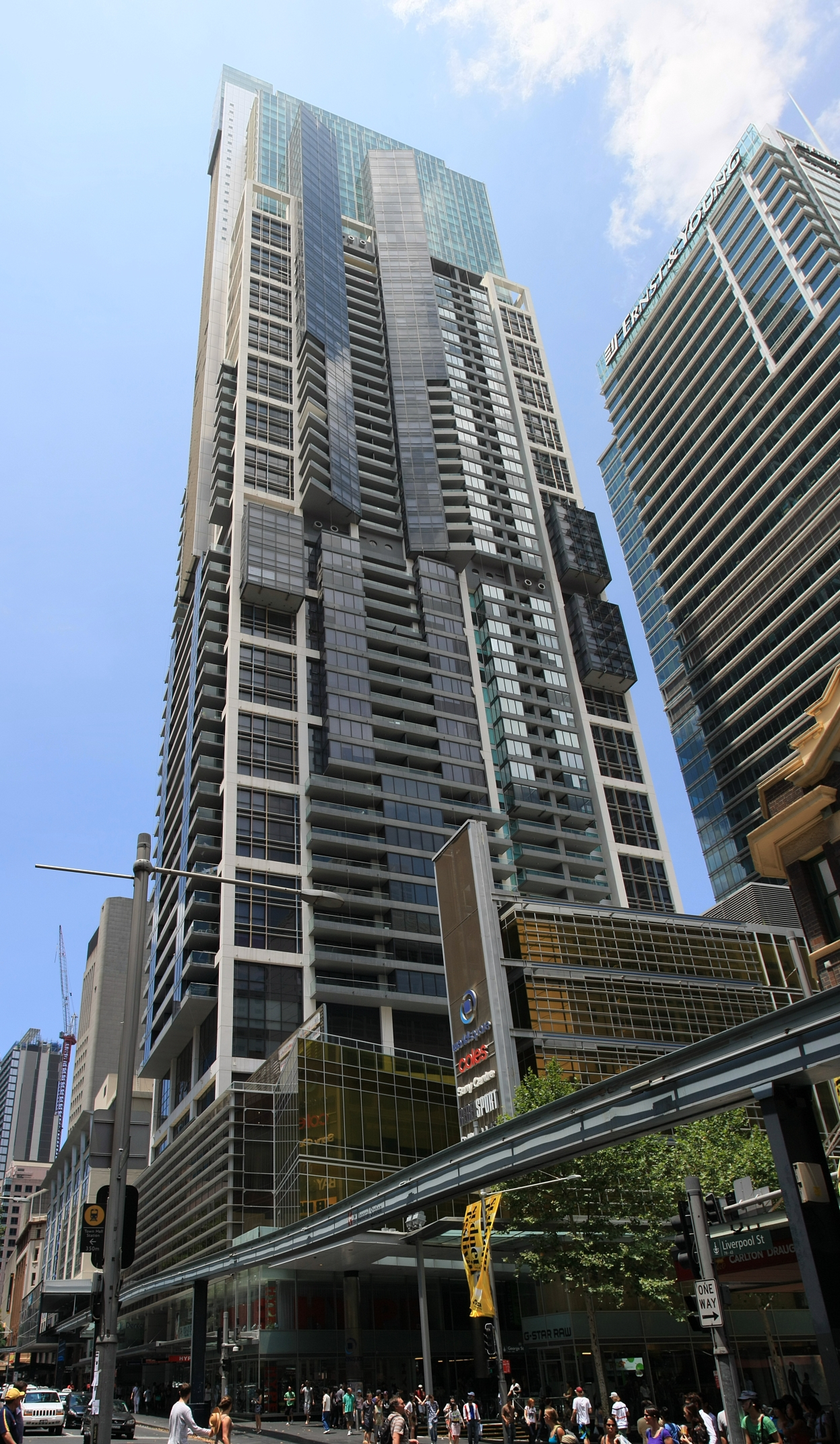
- World Square Tower from Liverpool Street in 2009 with the now demolished Sydney Monorail in the foreground

General information
- Architectural style: Modernist
- Location: Bounded by George, Liverpool, Pitt and Goulburn Streets, Brickfield Hill, Sydney CBD, Australia, 644 George Street
- Coordinates: 33°52′39″S 151°12′24″E
- Construction started: c. 1990
- Construction stopped: c. 2007
- Owner: IFM Investors (50%); Acadia Funds Management (50%)

Technical details
- Floor area: 16,567.5 square metres (178,331 sq ft)

Website
- worldsquare.com.au

World Square is a residential, shopping, dining and event precinct located in the Sydney Central Business District. It fills an entire Sydney city block, bounded by George, Liverpool, Pitt and Goulburn Streets, on what was a small hill called Brickfield Hill.

World Square features a shopping centre, hotels, office buildings and residential apartment towers. Liverpool Lane, off Liverpool Street, is part of World Square and features restaurants, cafes and take away shops. It is also the home of Southern Cross Austereo's Sydney radio stations Triple M and 2Day FM.

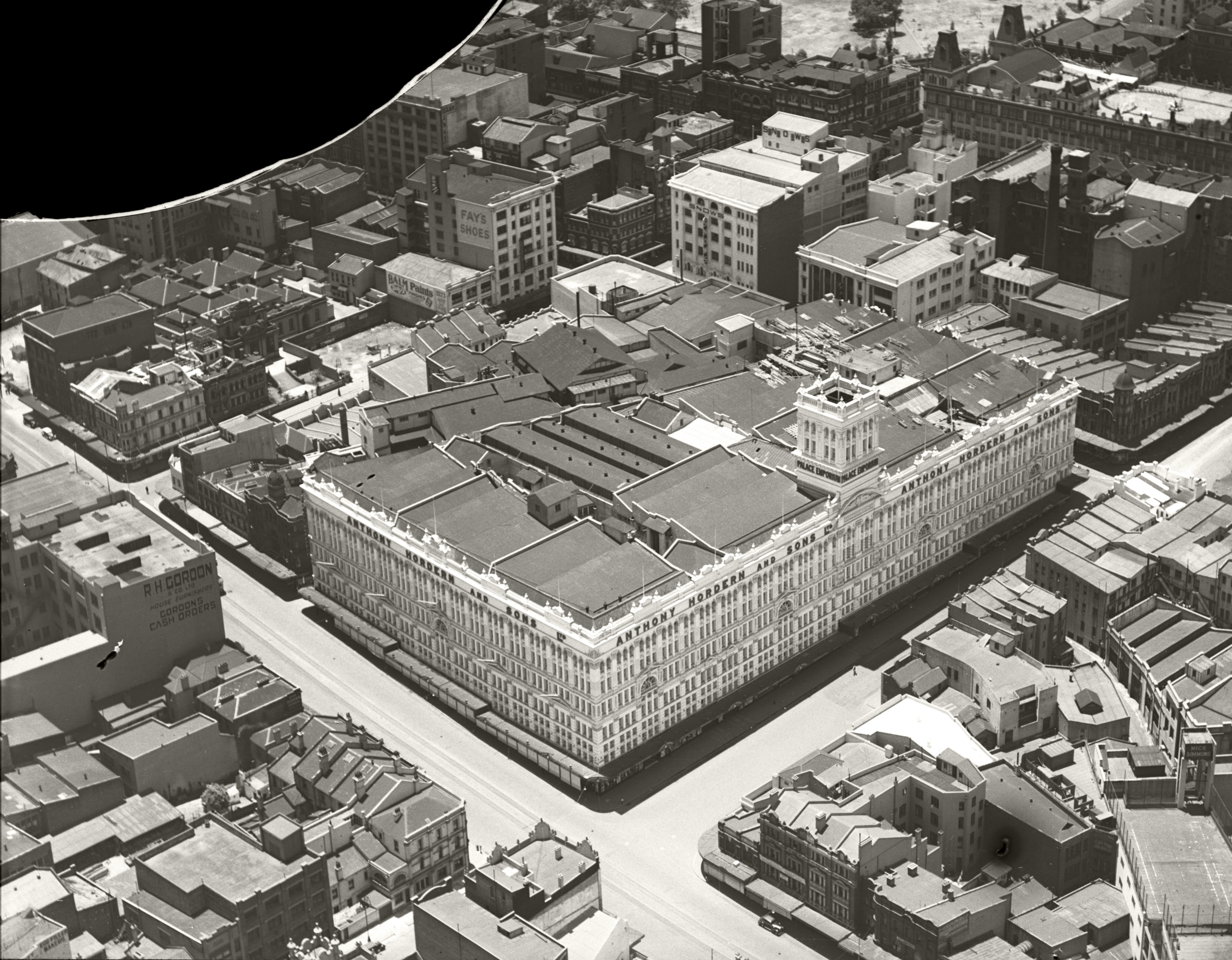
Aerial view of Anthony Hordern & Sons' Palace Emporium

== Buildings ==
- Rydges World Square Hotel (formerly the Avillion Hotel Sydney), corner of Pitt Street and Liverpool Street. 10 floors of hotel, restaurants and commercial space. Construction ended in 1999.
- Hordern Towers, on Pitt Street. 48 floors of residential apartments and commercial space Construction ended in 1999.
- World Tower, on Liverpool Street. 73 floors of residential apartments and commercial suites. Construction ended in 2004.
- Latitude, 680 George Street and 50 Goulburn Street. 51 floors of commercial space. Construction ended in 2004.
- Latitude East, corner of Pitt Street and Goulburn Street. 12 floors of commercial space. Construction ended in 2007.
- The World Square Shopping Centre is located on the Lower Ground floor and Ground floor of this development containing various retailers.

== History ==
World Square is located on an area of land which was once called Brickfield Hill. The first land grant of Brickfield Hill (George Street, between Liverpool and Goulburn Streets) was granted to Samuel Hockley in 1810 by Governor Macquarie, where Hockley set up a butchery. Hockley lived at Brickfield Hill until his death in 1859, where he was noted as one of the oldest colonists in Sydney.

The site was eventually sold. In 1905, the Anthony Hordern & Sons department store, a six-storey building opened on the former Brickfield Hill. At one point it was the largest department store in the world. The flagship store operated from 1905 until 1966 with the store converted to Horderns HomeWorld which operated until its closure in 1973. After the takeover of Anthony Hordern's by Waltons in January 1970, the Brickfield Hill site was then sold to Stocks and Holdings Ltd, for $8.5 million, ending 64 years of retail pioneering and ownership of the building by Anthony Hordern's Ltd.

Following the closure of the department store, the building operated as Palace Emporium and was subsequently used by the NSW Institute of Technology (now UTS). Palace Emporium and Institute of Technology operated in the building until the late 1970s. Since then the building remained vacant due to strict fire regulations changed and the building was no longer adequately fire-rated.

In the early 1980s the building's new owner, a Singaporean-based Ipoh Garden Development planned to try to save the Anthony Hordern & Sons building. However it was found to be too costly after receiving independent advice from the CSIRO on the state of the building's concrete and other fittings. The building was controversially demolished in 1986 which led to the site remaining undeveloped throughout most of the 1990s due to planning disputes. During the dispute, scenes for the 1995 film Mighty Morphin Power Rangers: The Movie were shot on the former property of Hordern & Sons and future site of World Square.

In 1988 the now defunct Sydney Monorail stopped at the development's temporary 'built-in' station. The station was incorporated into the new building in 2005 and operated until 2013.

In 1999 the Avillion Hotel Sydney, Hordern Towers and stage 1 of the shopping centre was completed. The World Tower, Latitude, Latitude East and the final stages of the shopping centre was completed in 2004.

The shopping centre featured a Coles supermarket, Sony Centre, Rebel Sport, BaySwiss, Retravision and 80 stores. Retravision closed in 2008 and was replaced by JB Hi-Fi. In April 2015 Rebel Sport closed down.

In 2016 ISPT acquired 50% stake of World Square with the other half owned by Arcadia Funds Management.

== Tenants ==
World Square has 16,567 m^{2} of floor space with major retailers including Australia Post, Coles, Gong Grocer Asian Supermarket, and JB Hi-Fi.

== Incidents and accidents ==
- On 7 March 2016, a man was critically injured after falling from an 18-storey building. Police were called to an apartment block around 2:45am following reports a man was throwing items from his balcony. Police negotiators talked to the man for a number of hours. Despite this the man, who is believed to be aged in his mid-40s, fell from the balcony just after 5am. He was treated at the scene before being taken to St Vincent's Hospital. The shopping and restaurant precinct was closed for a number of hours whilst police conduct inquiries.
- On 29 June 2020, a man was fighting for his life after falling off an escalator. Emergency services were called at 1am and the man was rushed to St Vincent's Hospital where he remained in a critical condition in intensive care.

== Gallery ==
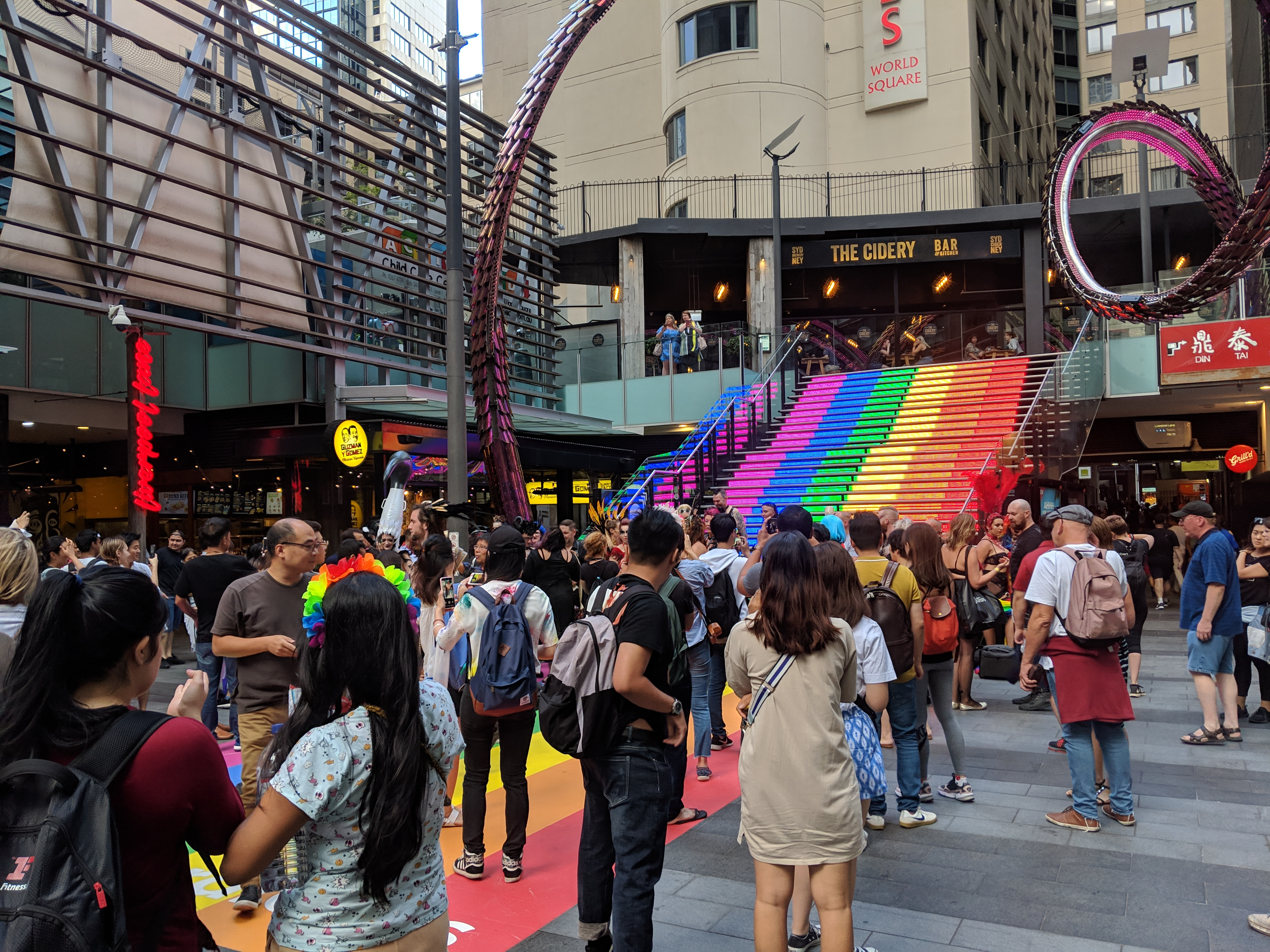
The centre of World Square during the Mardi Gras, 2019

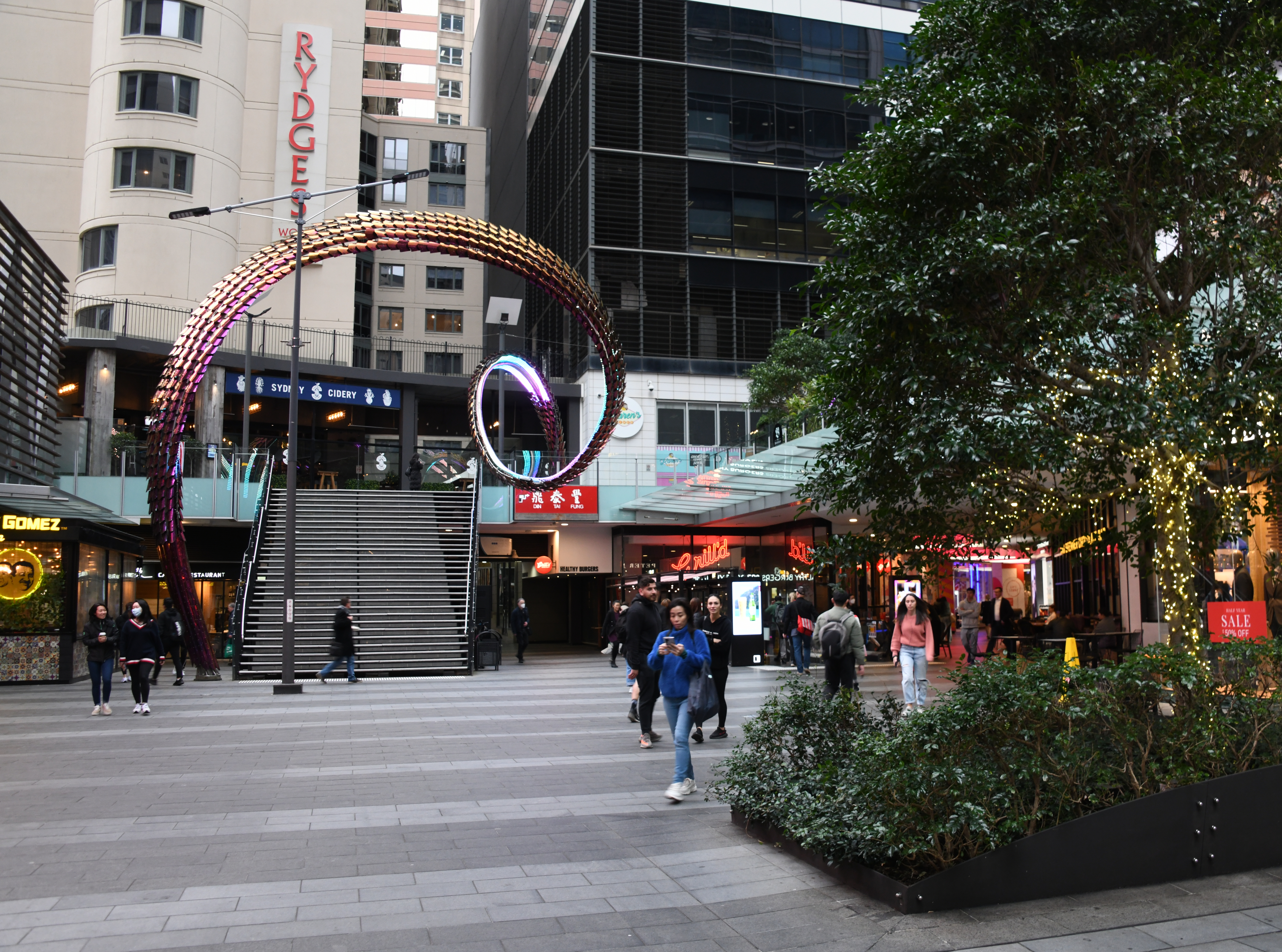
A second photo of the centre of World Square. 2022

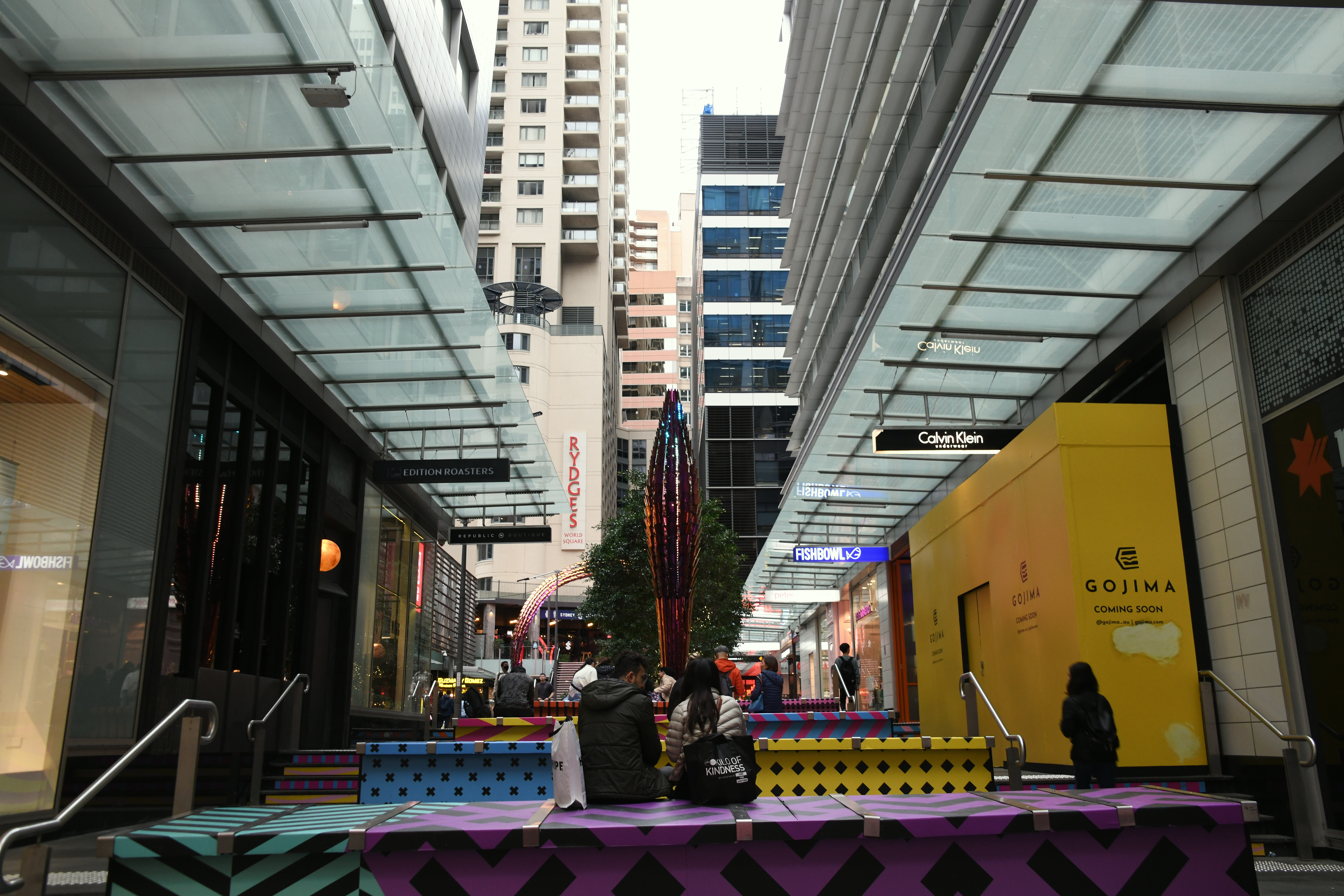
Steps leading up to the centre. 2022

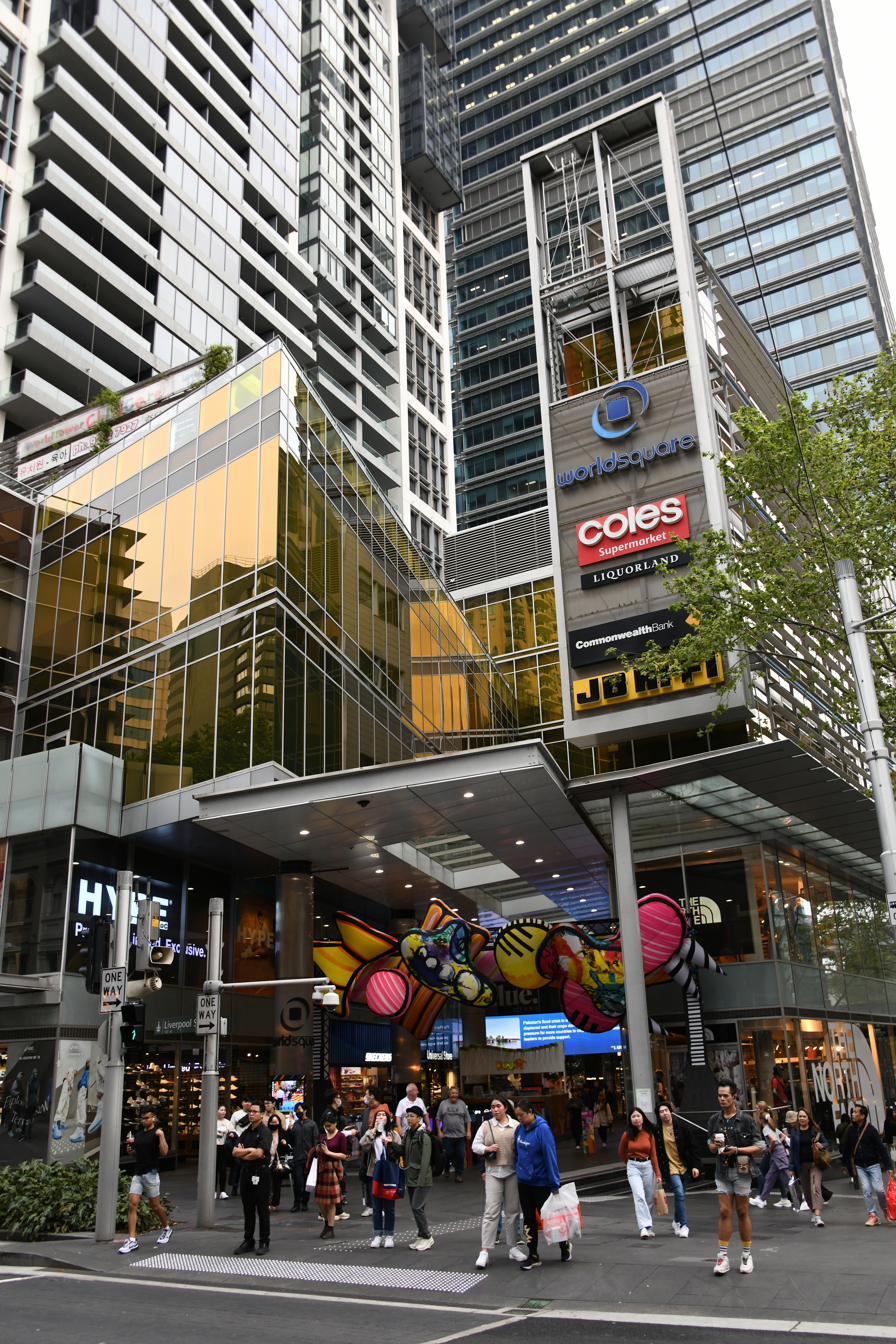
North-West entrance. 2022
