= Ronald Irish =

Sir Ronald Arthur Irish (26 March 1913 – 12 July 1993) attended Fort Street High School in the 1930s. He later became Chairman of Rothmans of Pall Mall (Australia), now British American Tobacco Australia. He is also the author of several books on auditing. He is an Honorary Fellow of the University of Sydney.
