= Brickfield Hill =

Locality in inner city Sydney, Australia

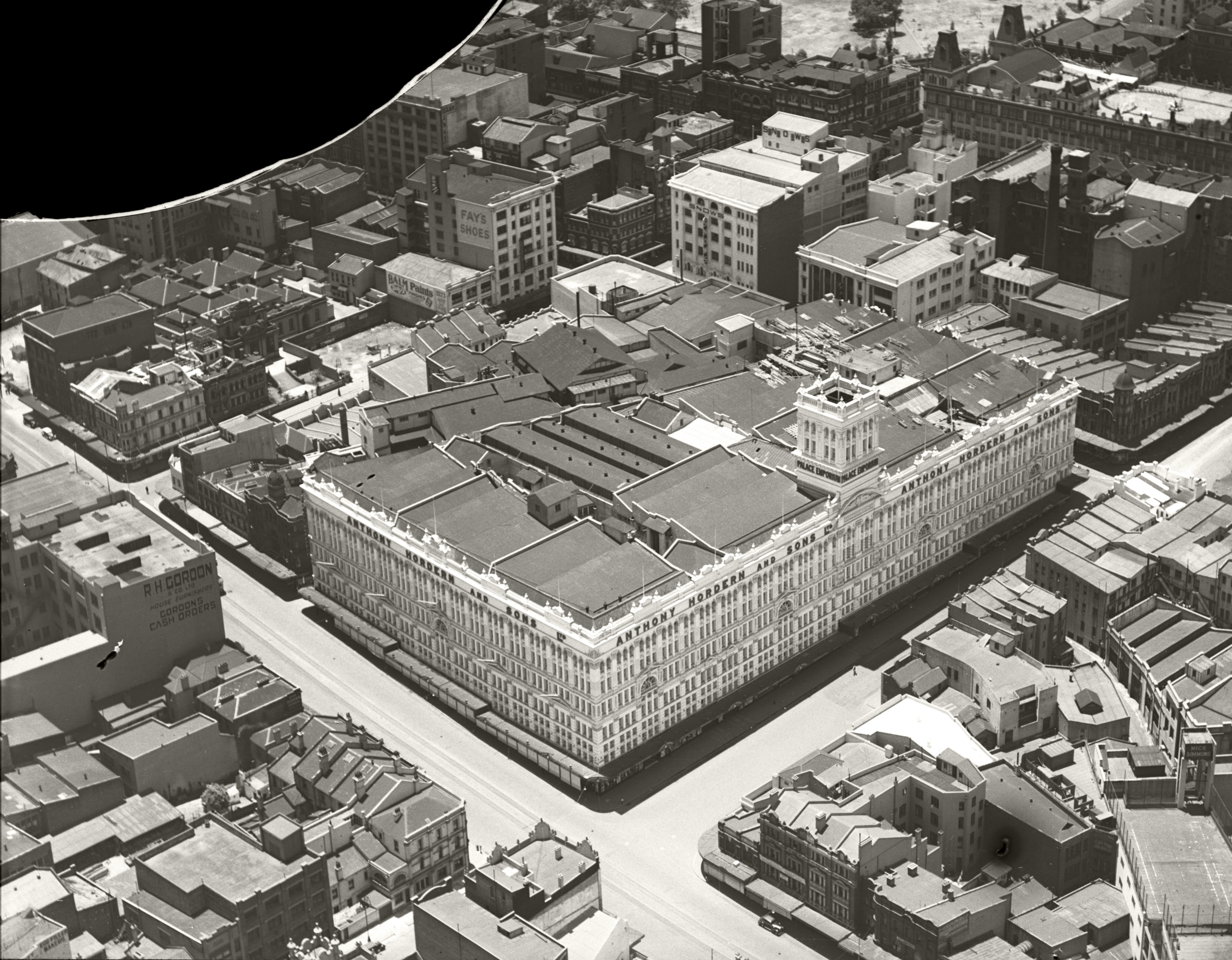
Aerial view of Anthony Hordern & Sons Palace Emporium on Brickfield Hill, December 1936

Brickfield Hill was the name of a locality in the Sydney central business district, Australia. The name was used until approximately 1970 for the surrounding settlement serving the colony's growing need for bricks, and today is part of the suburb of Surry Hills.

== History ==
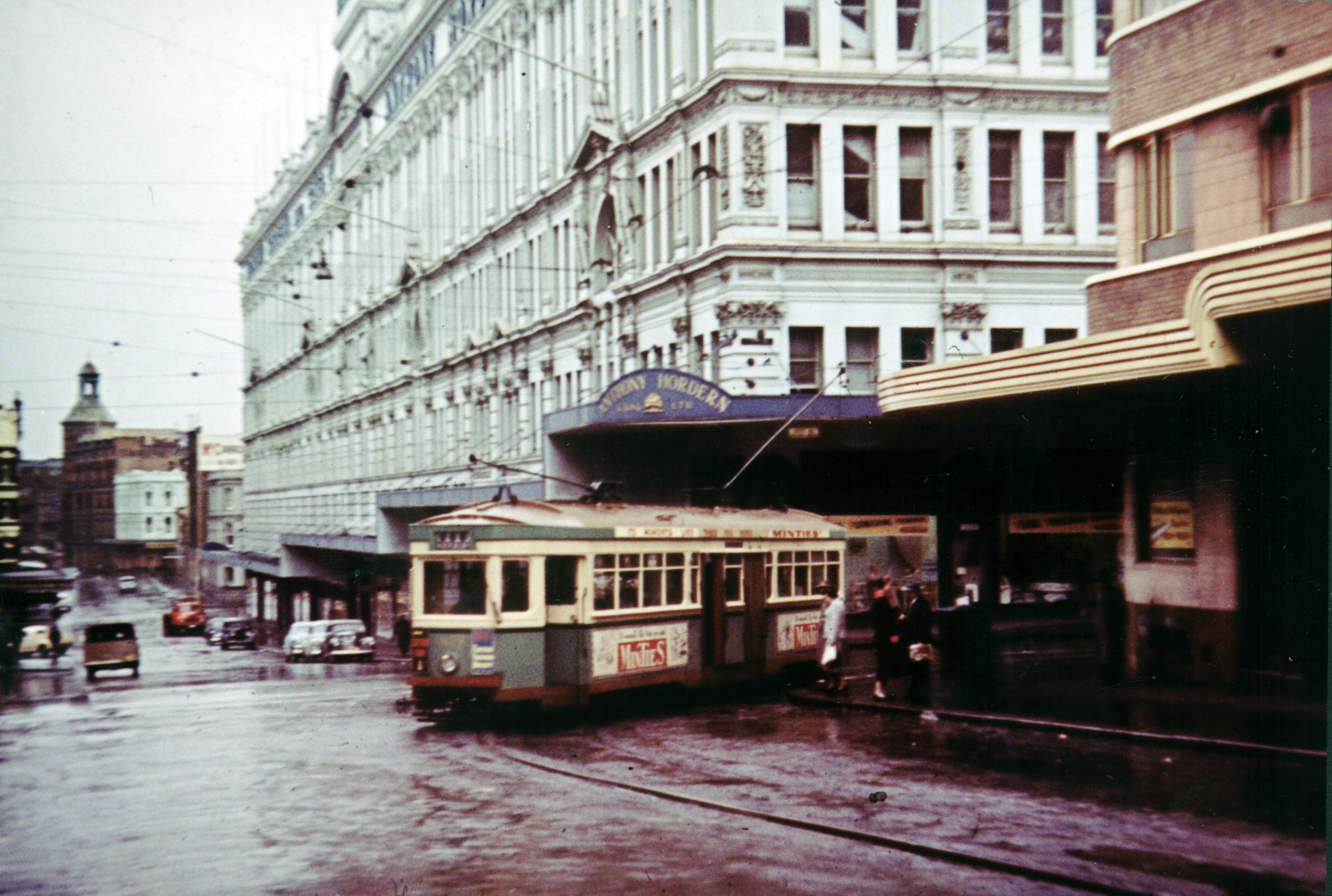
Tram in Goulburn Street, outside Anthony Hordern & Sons department store 1953

The first land grant of Brickfield Hill (George Street, between Liverpool and Goulburn Streets) was granted to Samuel Hockley in 1810 by Governor Macquarie, where Hockley set up a butchery. Hockley lived at Brickfield Hill until his death in 1859, where he was noted as one of the oldest colonists in Sydney.

Brickfield Hill was a Sydney postal address until postcodes were introduced in 1967, and roughly covered the area between Sydney Town Hall and Central station.

The area was used for brick-making, hence the term, up until the 1840s when land values rose and merchant stores, warehouses, and housing became more prominent, although the area remained a relatively poor 'slum' area of the city.

In 1905, following the destruction of their Haymarket store by fire in 1901, Anthony Hordern & Sons opened their new Palace Emporium on Brickfield Hill, the construction of which involved the demolition of several houses including Samuel Hordern's birthplace. Following the demise of the Hordern retailing empire, the building was used by the New South Wales Institute of Technology Faculty of Business and later also Faculty of Law, from 1967 to 1984. The building was controversially demolished in 1985–1986 and was eventually replaced by the World Square development.

== See also ==
- Jack Lang, 23rd Premier of New South Wales, was born in Brickfield Hill in 1876.
- Brickfielder, the hot wind, takes its name from Brickfield Hill
- Devonshire Street Cemetery, incorrectly known as Brickfield Hill Cemetery as it was located in this area.
- Athenaeum Theatre, Sydney, short-lived entertainment venue at 610 George Street
