= Samuel Hordern =

Australian businessman, animal breeder and philanthropist

Sir Samuel Hordern KBE
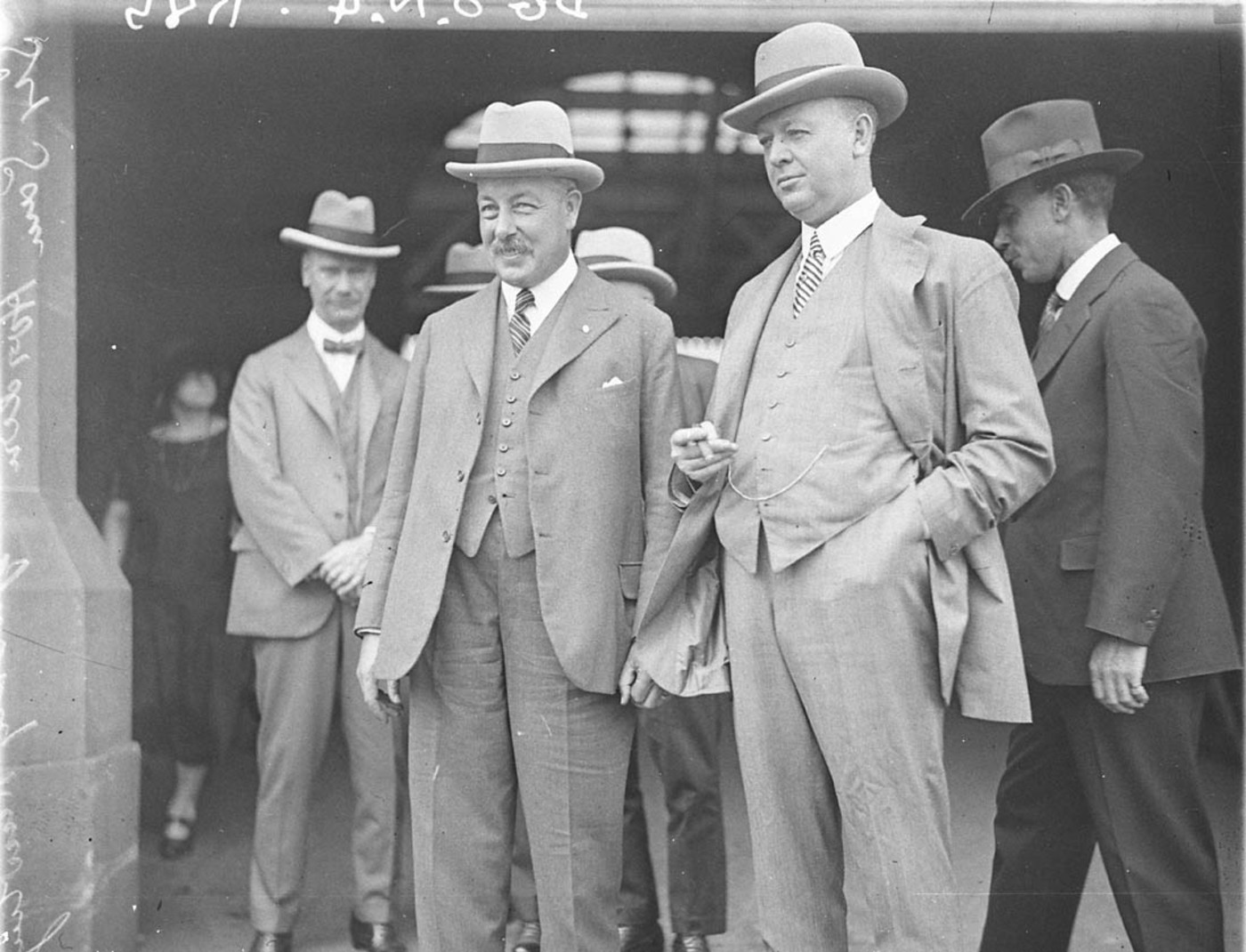
- Hordern (right) with Justly Rawlings, c. 1924
- Born: 24 September 1876; Retford Hall, Darling Point, Colony of New South Wales
- Died: 3 June 1956 (aged 79); Babworth House, Darling Point, New South Wales, Australia
- Occupations: Businessman; Animal breeder Philanthropist
- Title: Governing Director of Anthony Hordern & Sons (1909–26)
- Spouse(s): Charlotte Isabel Annie See (m.1900–1952; her death)
- Children: Sam Hordern; Doreen Hordern; Charlotte Audrey Hordern
- Relatives: John See (father-in-law); Celia Winter-Irving (granddaughter)

Sir Samuel Hordern KBE (24 September 1876 – 3 June 1956) was an Australian businessman, animal breeder and philanthropist. Born into the prominent Sydney trading family, Hordern directed the family company of Anthony Hordern & Sons from 1909 to 1926.

== Early years ==
Samuel Hordern was born on 24 September 1876 at Retford Hall, Darling Point in Sydney, the eldest son of Samuel Hordern and Jane Maria Booth. His father was the grandson of Anthony Hordern I, who founded Anthony Hordern & Sons as a drapery shop in 1823, and his mother was the daughter of prominent Sydney produce merchant and later Alderman, John Booth. Educated at Sydney Grammar School and Bath College in England, Hordern returned to Sydney in 1895 to take up employment in the family business. On 4 March 1900, Hordern married Charlotte Isabel Annie See, daughter of Premier John See, at St Jude's Church, Randwick and they had one son and two daughters. In the same month, Hordern purchased the 1890 Federation Arts & Crafts house, "Tuxedo", in Albert Road, Strathfield, which became the family's residence until July 1914 when Hordern sold it.

== Anthony Hordern & Sons ==
On the death of his father in August 1909, in accordance with his father's will, Hordern took over management of the family company, which employed more than 4,000 people in its store and mail-order business and imported, manufactured and sold a vast range of merchandise. In 1910, Hordern purchased the 1837 Darling Point mansion, Mount Adelaide, from the family of Henry Mort, and commissioned architects Morrow & De Putron to design and build a Federation Arts & Crafts mansion, which he named Babworth House and which became his family's primary residence from 1915 until his death in 1956.

Hordern publicly listed the company in 1912 and restructured it in 1920. Hordern retired from the business in 1926, when he sold it to a public limited liability company for the sum of AU£2,900,000, described at the time as the "largest business sale that has ever taken place in the history of Australia".

== Later career and philanthropy ==
Hordern was a director of the Australian Mutual Provident Society, from 1915, and was its Chairman for fifteen years, until 1947.

He was a keen cattle, dog and horse breeder, and owner of racehorses, including the 1919 Melbourne Cup winner 'Artilleryman'. Hordern was knighted in 1919, received the King George V Silver Jubilee Medal (1935) and the King George VI Coronation Medal (1937), and was made a Knight Commander of the Order of the British Empire (KBE) in the 1938 Birthday Honours.

Hordern was president of the Royal Agricultural Society of New South Wales (1915-1941) and developed the Sydney Royal Easter Show into a major national event. Prominent in the Sydney Chamber of Commerce and many other business associations, he was a director of the Commonwealth Bank, president of the Master Retailers' Association, and chairman of the Australian Mutual Provident Society (1932–1947).

On 1 December 1917 Hordern purchased on behalf on an interested group of benefactors, the former vice-regal residence, Cranbrook in Bellevue Hill, from the Government of New South Wales for a Church of England boys' school and contributed towards the establishment in 1926 of a Church of England girls' school in the same area: Kambala School. He was a director of Royal Prince Alfred Hospital (1913–1939) and served as chairman of the hospital board in 1933–1934.

== Later life and legacy ==
The Hordern Pavilion at the Sydney Showground was built in 1924 to commemorate the Hordern family business and Hordern's long-standing role as president of the Royal Agricultural Society. Cape Hordern (originally "Hordern Island") in Antarctica was named after him by Douglas Mawson of the 1911–1914 Australasian Antarctic Expedition to honour his philanthropic support of the expedition. Hordern died age 79 on the same day as his sister, Jane, at his Darling Point residence, "Babworth House", on 3 June 1956. Following his death in 1956 the contents of Babworth House were sold at auction and the mansion was sold to a trust to become a hospital.

Business positions
Preceded by Samuel Hordern	Governing Director of Anthony Hordern & Sons; 1909 – 1926	Succeeded by Mark Sheldon as Chairman
Preceded by Alfred Meeks	Chairman of the Australian Mutual Provident Society; 1932 – 1947	Succeeded by Cecil Hoskins
Non-profit organization positions
Preceded by Francis Suttor	President Royal Agricultural Society of New South Wales; 1915 – 1941	Succeeded by Archibald Howie
Medical appointments
Preceded by Cecil Purser	Chairman of the Royal Prince Alfred Hospital; 1933 – 1934	Succeeded by Herbert Schlink
