= St Paul's Anglican Church, Burwood =

- St Paul's Anglican Church and Pipe Organ
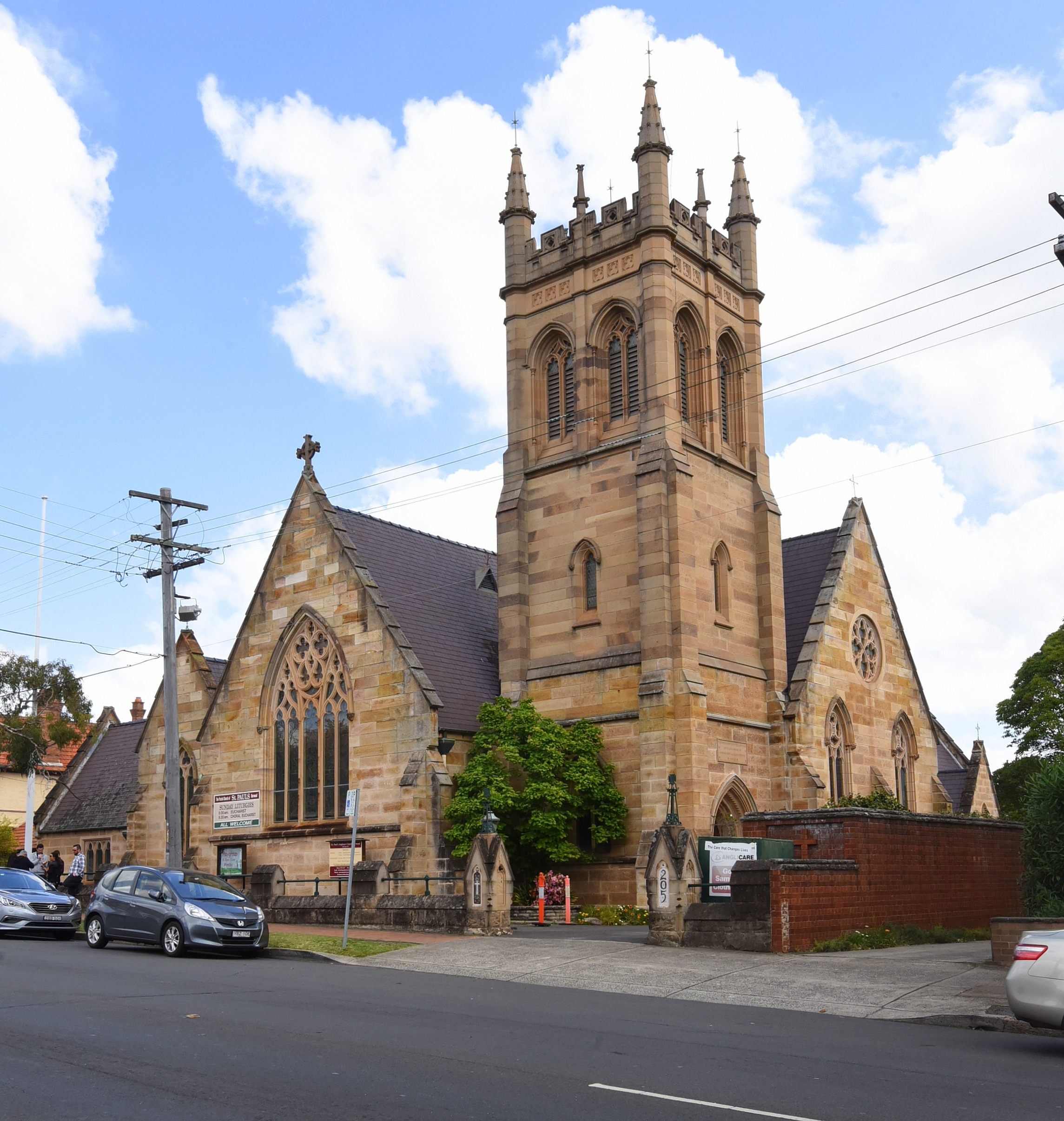
- St Paul's Church, Burwood, pictured in 2018

- Location in greater metropolitan Sydney
- 33°52′54″S 151°06′09″E
- Location: 205 Burwood Road, Burwood, Municipality of Burwood, New South Wales
- Country: Australia
- Denomination: Anglican
- Website: stpaulsburwood.org.au

History
- Status: Church
- Dedication: Saint Paul the Apostle

Architecture
- Functional status: Active
- Architects: Edmund Blacket (church); William Davidson; with some consultation from Montague Younger (organ)
- Architectural type: Church
- Style: Gothic Revival
- Years built: 1889–1891

Clergy
- Rector: Father James Collins

New South Wales Heritage Register
- Official name: St. Paul's Anglican Church and Pipe Organ; St Paul's Anglican Church; Davidson Pipe Organ
- Type: State heritage (built)
- Designated: 2 April 1999
- Reference no.: 436
- Type: Church
- Category: Religion
- Builders: W. Davidson (organ)

St Paul's Anglican Church and Pipe Organ is a heritage-listed Anglican church building and pipe organ located at 205 Burwood Road in the Sydney suburb of Burwood in the Municipality of Burwood local government area of New South Wales, Australia. The church was designed by Edmund Blacket and the organ was designed by William Davidson, with some consultation from Montague Younger. The church and organ were built from 1889 to 1891. The church is also known as St. Paul's Anglican Church and Pipe Organ, St Paul's Anglican Church and Davidson Pipe Organ. The property is owned by Anglican Church Property Trust. It was added to the New South Wales State Heritage Register on 2 April 1999.

== History ==
=== Burwood ===
Parramatta Road was first created in 1791, a vital land (cf water) artery between Sydney Cove and Rose Hill's settlement and crops. Liverpool Road opened in 1814 as Governor Macquarie's Great South Road. Its winding route reflects pre-existing land grant boundaries. To Burwood's north over Parramatta Rd. was Longbottom Government Farm, staffed by convicts. This grew to over 283 hectares (700 acres) on heavily timbered flat, sloping to swamps on Hen & Chicken Bay. Commissioner Bigge recorded how valuable timber (ironbark) was cut and sawn on the spot, conveyed to Sydney in boats by the river. "Charcoal for the forges and foundries is likewise prepared here" he noted.

Two grants were critical on Burwood's clay: Captain Thomas Rowley's Burwood Farm estate and William Faithful's 405-hectare (1,000-acre) grant to its south in Enfield covered most of modern Burwood. Rowley, adjutant of the NSW Corps, named it after the farm he'd lived on in Cornwall. 1799 and subsequent grants brought it to 750 acres but he continued to live at Kingston Farm in Newtown until his death in 1806. He'd bought some of the first Spanish merinos brought from the Cape Colony in 1797, others being sold to Macarthur, Marsden & Cox. The southern boundary of his farm was approximately Woodside Avenue & Fitzroy Street.

Under Rowley's will the estate passed to his three underage children- executors Dr Harris & Major Johnstone were both involved in the 1808 Bligh rebellion and returned to England for the court martial. Governor Macquarie appointed Thomas Moore as guardian and executor. In 1812 he wrongfully auctioned the estate. It was bought by Sydney businessman Alexander Riley. He's believed to have built Burwood Villa in 1814 (perhaps on older (1797) foundations of Rowley's shepherd's cottage) and lived here until departing for England in 1817. In 1824 Joseph Lycett described the estate. 202 hectares (500 acres) had been cleared for pasture. Lycett in Views of Australia described "a garden of 4 acres in full cultivation, containing upwards of three hundred Trees, bearing the following choice fruits, viz. The Orange, Citron, Lemon, Pomegranate, Loquat, Guava, Peaches, Nectarines, Apricots, Apples, Pears, the Cherry, Plums, Figs, Chestnuts, Almonds, Medlars, Quinces; with abundance of Raspberries, Strawberries, and the finest Melons. &c;".

Until the 1830s Burwood consisted of a few inns along the highways and 2 or 3 huge, undeveloped estates within the next 20 years these began to break up, attracting settlers and encouraging the growth of embryo villages at Burwood & Enfield. Riley died in 1833 and Rowley's children, now of age, started legal proceedings and regained possession of the 304-hectare (750-acre) estate. It was divided between Thomas jnr., John, John Lucas* and Henry Biggs. Almost at once they subdivided into lots of 2–8 hectares (4–20 acres)4 for country homes and small farms. In 1834 Burwood estate was held by John Lucas, husband of Thomas's daughter Mary Rowley), who divided 46 hectares (113 acres) of his 86 hectares (213 acres) into small allotments for sale. Streets such as Webb, Lucas Road, Wentworth Road and Strathfield's The Boulevarde reflect the boundaries of these subdivisions/estates.

To the south (including the land later the Appian Way) was William Faithful's grant of 405 hectares (1,000 acres) (1808) at "Liberty Plains". Faithful was a private in the NSW Corps: discharged in 1799 he became Captain Foveaux's farm manager, and this connection got him the grant. Apart from 6 hectares (15 acres) of Sarah Nelson's on Malvern Hill (Croydon), Faithful's Farm extended from Rowley's farm to Cooks River and west to Punchbowl Road. The government retained a right to build a road through it (doing so in 1815: Liverpool or the Great South Road), and to cut "such timber as may be deemed fit for naval purposes" - the area was thick with tall ironbark. Faithful exchanged it in 1815. Alexander Riley bought his 81 hectares (200 acres) north of the new road incorporating it into his Burwood estate. This was jointly owned by the Rowley family after 1833 and had no streets across it, only a few tracks.

Despite opening up of the Rowley estate there was little settlement in Burwood between the two highways before 1860. Sydney Railway Company opened the first rail to Parramatta in 1855. Burwood "station" (just west of Ashfield station, one of the first stations) was a wooden platform near a level crossing over the grassy track that was Neich's Lane* (later Burwood Road). This was beside "the newly laid out township of Cheltenham". Speedy transport meant subdivision and consolidation followed, filling out the area. Burwood's biggest growth spurt was between 1874 & 1900 (Burwood's population was, respectively: 1200–7400, an increase not matched since. *1835 maps show this as the only track between Parramatta / Liverpool Roads in Burwood.

Burwood's first public school was c. 1838. In 1843 land on Burwood Road was granted to the Anglican Church for a school. St. Mary's Catholic Church opened in 1846, a Presbyterian Church in 1857 and St. Paul's Anglican in 1871. Mansions of the 1870s+ such as The Priory were due to a firm belief in its health-giving climate, compared to the smog and crowding of the city suburbs. They were built as quasi-ancestral estates, perhaps in blissful ignorance of how quickly suburbs can evolve. Living was primitive: no street lighting (1883+), home lighting by candle or lamp (oil, kerosene after 1860), no gas (1882+), no piped water (1886+), home wells/tanks, few bathrooms, no indoor toilets, with pans (1880+) replacing outdoor cess pits.

The 1880s+ was the era of the debates that led to Australia's fractious states combining into a single Federation, declared at Sydney's Centennial Park, in 1901. Skilled tradesmen and materials were plentiful and comparatively cheap, and combined with the improvement in building techniques associated with cavity walls, damp-courses and terracotta tiled roofs, provided the means for an era of intense building activity. Unlike the Victorian era's large commercial and Government building, the main thrust of the Federation era was constructing new suburbs around Sydney harbour with shops for the middle classes.

Between 1889 and 1918 Australia's population swelled from 3 to 5 million triggering an urgent need for housing. Suburban spread was greatly assisted by expansion of the public transport system of trams, ferries and trams, which formed a well-integrated pre-car transport system. Rapid suburban growth brought increased interest in town planning. Tree-lined streets such as Burwood Road, The Appian Way or The Boulevard in Strathfield were in marked contrast to most development in Australian cities of the late 19th century.

=== Church history ===
Of the 20 or more churches whose parishes or spheres of influence include parts of Burwood six are situated outside its boundaries, and even this does not include St. John's Ashfield, whose parish once included all of Burwood and Croydon.

Today the municipality is served by six other Anglican churches. The oldest, St. Thomas' (Enfield) was founded in 1848 and became a parish in its own right from 1868. The move to establish a parish church in central Burwood was sponsored by a group of gentlemen including the Rev. R. W. Young, incumbent of St. Thomas' Anglican church (Enfield). When St. Paul's was opened in Burwood Road (1872) Rev.Young left Enfield to become its first rector. At the time of its opening the church consisted solely of the nave with a temporary wooden wall where the transepts now cross it, but subsequent extensions - including the tower - have closely followed the design of ecclesiastical architect, Edmund Blacket.

Several parishioners liberally supported the church in its early years, either by direct contributions or by advancing funds, Mr H. E. Krater of Enfield making an initial loan of A£1000.

The present vicarage was added in 1897, and with the addition of the choir in 1905 and the tower in 1924 under the supervision of architect E. Lindsay Thompson, the church was virtually completed as Blacket conceived it. During the period of rector Rev. Ronald O'Brien (1957-1970s) a peel of bells has been installed in the tower in 1960 and stone fencing completed along the Burwood Road frontage.

The Pipe Organ was commissioned during the incumbency of Canon Bartlett, a period of growth and establishment of pattern of liturgy at St Paul's. It was at first intended as a rebuild of an earlier organ; builder decided to build a new, larger instrument. Completed, with suggestions from St Andrew's Cathedral organist Montague Younger, and opened with a recital on 30 April 1891 by the aforementioned organist. Some teething problems by the early 20th century, seen to by Richardson. It had long term use in the church's choral services, and frequent oratorio performances. The longest serving organist was Mr Tom Leah (+1970); another well known organist was Colin Sapsford, who became organist at Christ Church, St Laurence during the incumbency of Rev John Hope.

During the incumbency of Rev John Holle (organist Peter McMillan) an attempt was made to substantially rebuild the instrument, which was halted by a Government Heritage Conservation Order. The Rector, in frustration locked and barred the instrument from use, buying an electronic Rodgers Organ. This precipitated the resignation of the organist and the defection of the choir to St Anne's Strathfield (late 1980s). Under the current Rector, Rev John Kohler and organist Luke Green, the organ has been returned to complete use in the church services and recital/concert-giving. Some minor preventative measures (tying up trumpet resonators, tuning) was carried out in early 1997.

Unfortunate rebuilds of Davidson's larger St Thomas', North Sydney and St James', King Street, Sydney, make the Burwood organ the largest largely intact instrument of this builder and the largest of colonial NSW manufacture last century.

== Description ==
St. Paul's Church is of State significance as a fine example of Edmund Blacket's ecclesiastical work and as a focal point of the Municipality. This Gothic Church (1871, completed 1924) situated high on Burwood Road and constructed of sandstone. Its features are include a slate roof, a tower, stone tracery and stained glass arched windows.

A pipe organ of three manual, and one pedal, divisions; Mechanical action to the manuals, tubular pneumatic to the pedals. The great organ's chorus is of 16' to the III-rank mixture; also two large flutes of 8' and 4' pitch; a trumpet reed, 8'. The swell organ's chorus is of 8' to a II-rank mixture; also a 16' bourdon, an 8' gedackt, viola and voix celeste; a horn reed, 8', an oboe reed, 8' and a clarion reed 4'.

The church organ has an 8' gedackt, two 8' strings; an 8' flauto traverso, a 4' lieblich flute; and an 8' clarionet reed.

The pedal organ has: open bass, bourdon (both 16') and 8' flute and violonce. Standard manual and pedal couplers (no octave or sub-bases); the swell and choir are under expression.

=== Condition ===
As at 11 April 2000, presently poor but usable. The pipework and action, layout and decorative features are substantially the same (including the position) as when first installed.

=== Modifications and dates ===
- 1905 - The moving of the organ's console and great organ windchest 305mm out into the chancel (little or no intrusion on the instrument's integrity).
- Some additions to the stop list, 1905, 1915, 1930, before 1930 (little intrusion).
- Badly fitted balance pedals for swell and choir expression (some intrusion especially poorly designed tremulant on swell's old trigger pedal)

== Heritage listing ==
St Paul's Anglican Church and Pipe Organ was listed on the New South Wales State Heritage Register on 2 April 1999 having satisfied the following criteria.

The place is important in demonstrating the course, or pattern, of cultural or natural history in New South Wales.

Cultural artifact of the late 19th century colonial NSW; growing economic stability, and affluence in the garden suburb of Burwood, resulted in a public musical instrument of considerable size and power, yet taste and restraint as most fitting of the strongly conservative political alignment of the area; speaking of confidence and cultural attention.

The place is important in demonstrating aesthetic characteristics and/or a high degree of creative or technical achievement in New South Wales.

A very virile, powerful, yet always tastefully restrained tone emanates from this instrument, capable of some subtlety and sweetness in tone for accompaniment etc.

Strikingly fluid, curved display fronts into the chancel; handsome blue-green, dark red and gold stenciling on the pipes in an excellent state of preservation.

The place has a strong or special association with a particular community or cultural group in New South Wales for social, cultural or spiritual reasons.

The organ is used up to three times (2 Holy Communions, Evensong) every Sunday; up to three times a week in weddings, funerals, additional services and concerts. Provides congregational singing accompaniment in chamber and small orchestral settings, Civic services and dedicatory services also. When in better condition, the organ could serve as an excellent teaching instrument (especially with many schools in the area).

The place has potential to yield information that will contribute to an understanding of the cultural or natural history of New South Wales.

Beside G Rushworth's outstanding research, the construction techniques and material sources etc. of colonial organ builders has not been so thoroughly documented, especially their resourcefulness in periods of economic Depression, lack of code of fair practice in working relations and contractual agreements, etc. The Burwood organ could easily be an opportunity to carefully document this, especially given its excellent condition or could be lost in yet another restoration of a more invasive character.

The place possesses uncommon, rare or endangered aspects of the cultural or natural history of New South Wales.

Largest organ in (near) intact state surviving by a NSW colonial builder.

The place is important in demonstrating the principal characteristics of a class of cultural or natural places/environments in New South Wales.

A fine representative of local building (as opposed to imported instruments from Britain) of the late 19th century.

== See also ==
- Australian non-residential architectural styles
- List of Anglican churches in the Diocese of Sydney
