= Appian Way, Burwood =

Street in Sydney, New South Wales, Australia

Appian Way New South Wales
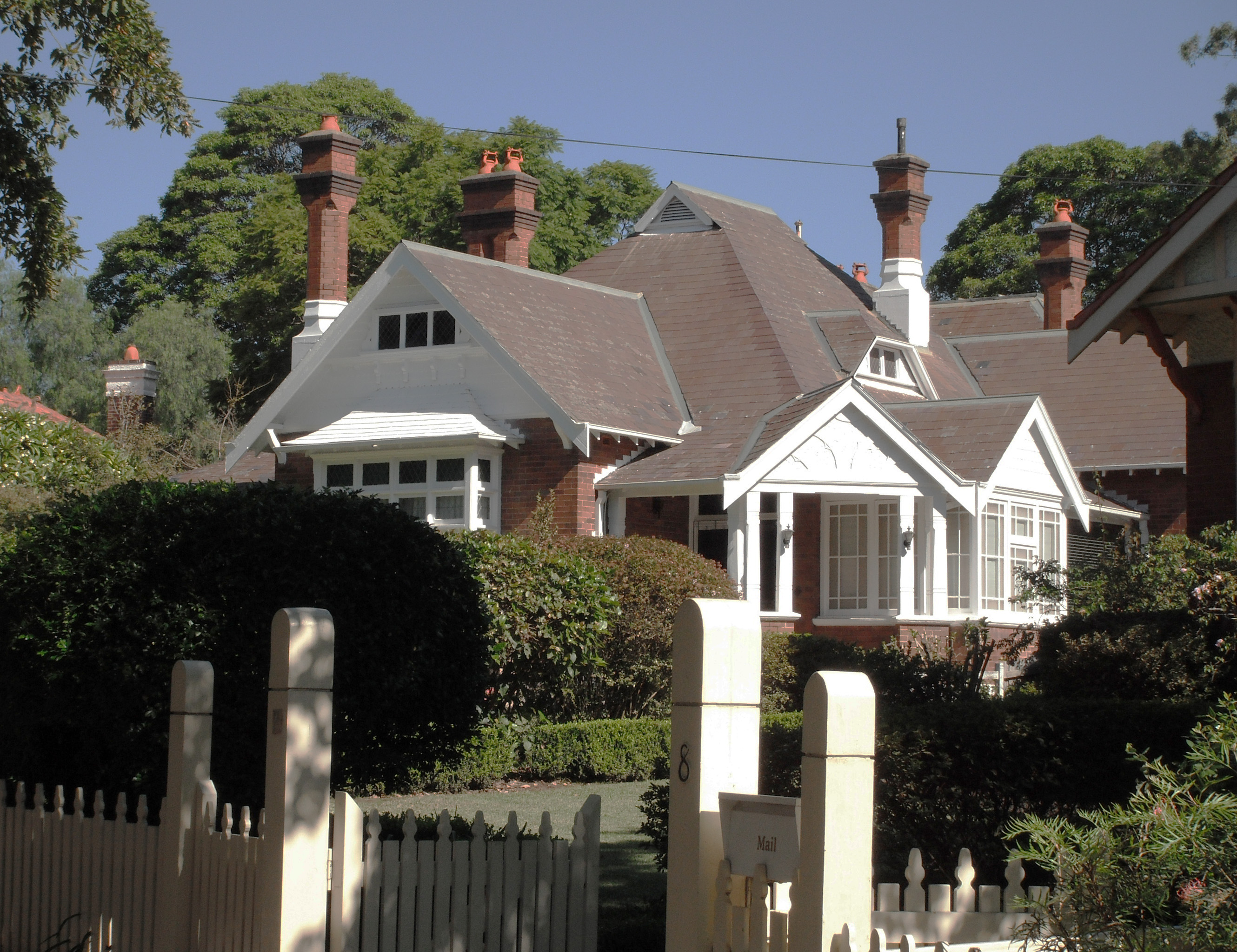
- 'Olevanus'

General information
- Type: Street

Major junctions
- West end: Burwood Road
- East end: Liverpool Road (A22)

Location(s)
- Suburb(s): Burwood

Appian Way is a street in the suburb of Burwood in Sydney, New South Wales, Australia.

The state heritage listed Appian Way has been described as one of the finest streets of Federation houses in Australia. The picturesque houses create an asymmetrical, multi-gabled roofscape with a variety of materials used such as slate and terracotta tiles and feature varied designs. The houses are complemented with landscaped gardens, manicured lawns and a nature strip with brush box trees. The serpentine street runs between Burwood Road and Liverpool Road with a communal reserve that has been converted into a lawn tennis club.

Homes in the street are designed in various Federation styles. Many are in the Federation Queen Anne style, but other styles are also represented. Erica and St Ellero are designed in the Federation Arts and Crafts style, while Casa Tasso and Ostia are just two out of several examples of the Federation Bungalow style.

== History ==
Also known as the Hoskins Estate, Appian Way was a model housing estate conceived by a wealthy industrialist, George J. Hoskins on 8 hectares of land that he purchased at the start of the 20th century. He bought the land, known as 'Humphreys Paddock' in April 1903, and submitted a proposal for an estate there by June of that year. Burwood Council approved the project in August. Built between 1903 and 1911, the estate of 36 Federation houses was created with his designer and builder William Richards to present an appropriate setting opposite the Hoskins St Cloud mansion on Burwood Road. They were not built to sell, but as a long-term investment to be occupied by selected tenants of appropriate social standing. The subdivisions were large (1,000–3,000 square metres), which allowed for spacious and low-set houses. The main thoroughfare itself, completed by 1905, is named after Appian Way (Latin and Italian: Via Appia), the most important ancient Roman road which connected Rome to Brindisi, Apulia in south-east Italy. Its meandering path heightened the informal tone of the estate, only now fully complemented by the mature trees.

Most houses focus on an oval-shaped village green that was originally intended for tennis, bowls and croquet. Additional tennis courts replaced the croquet lawn in 1909, and later the bowling green as well. Residents formed the Appian Way Recreation Club Limited in 1913, taking up 97 1 pound shares out of a capital of 200 pounds, with Hoskins' son Leslie (also a resident) holding the remainder as a majority shareholder. The green is surrounded by a picket fence and features hedges and an Edwardian pavilion clubhouse.

Of the original 45 allotments, 36 houses were built, and 30 are still standing. Hoskins allegedly planned for his niece to have them named after towns lying on the original Appian Way in Italy, but only four eventuated, a 'Roma', 'Brindisi', 'Capua', and 'Alba Longa'. All but two houses are single storey, 'Brianza' and the now-demolished 'Brindisi' gaining a second floor, so they could capture some aspect of the green.

The street has become the backdrop for movies and television advertisements, such as the 1987 mini-series Vietnam. Burwood Council welcomes filming in Appian Way.

== Gallery ==
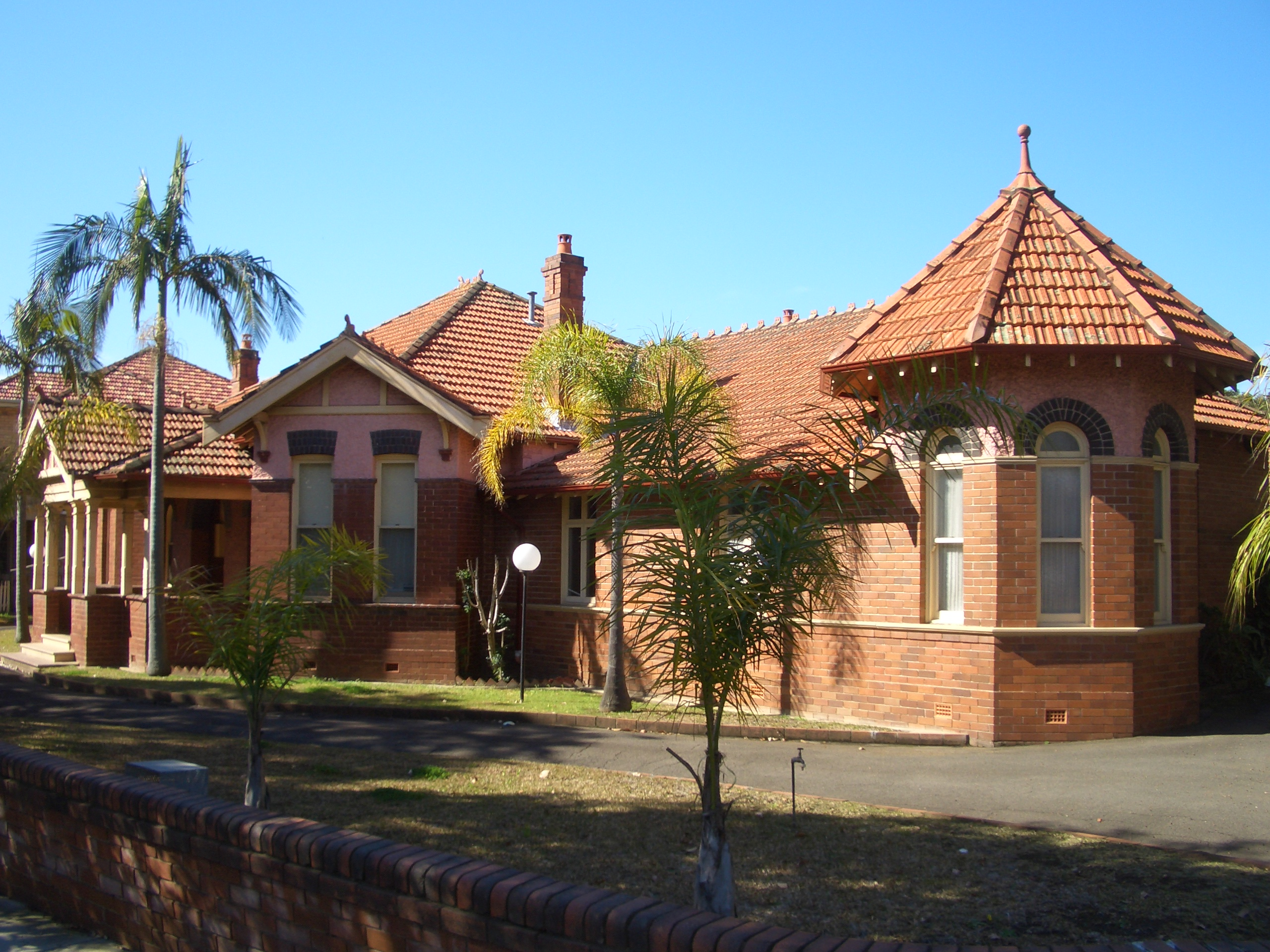
'Colonna', restrained Queen Anne style architecture

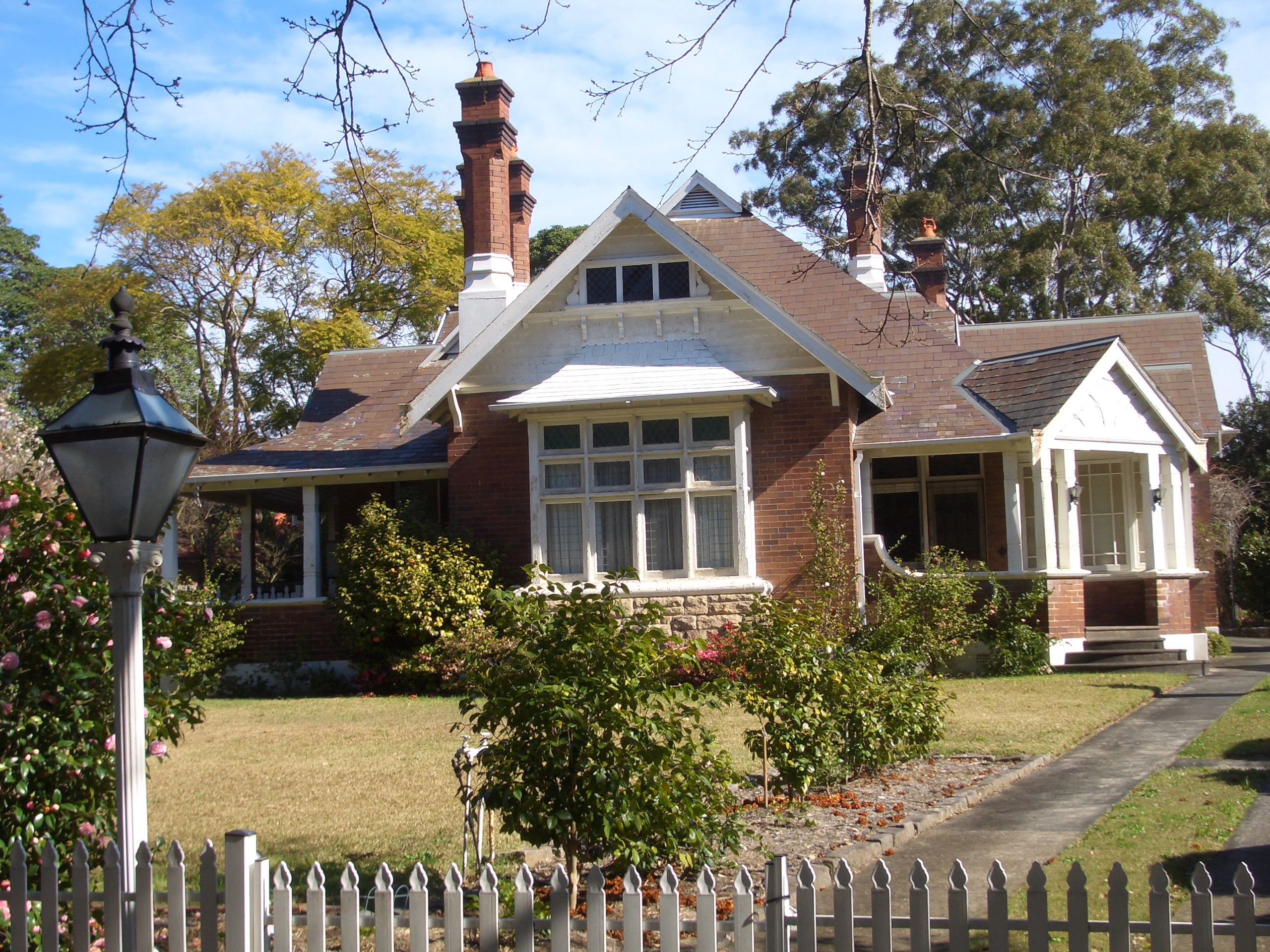
'Olevanus', also Queen Anne Style architecture

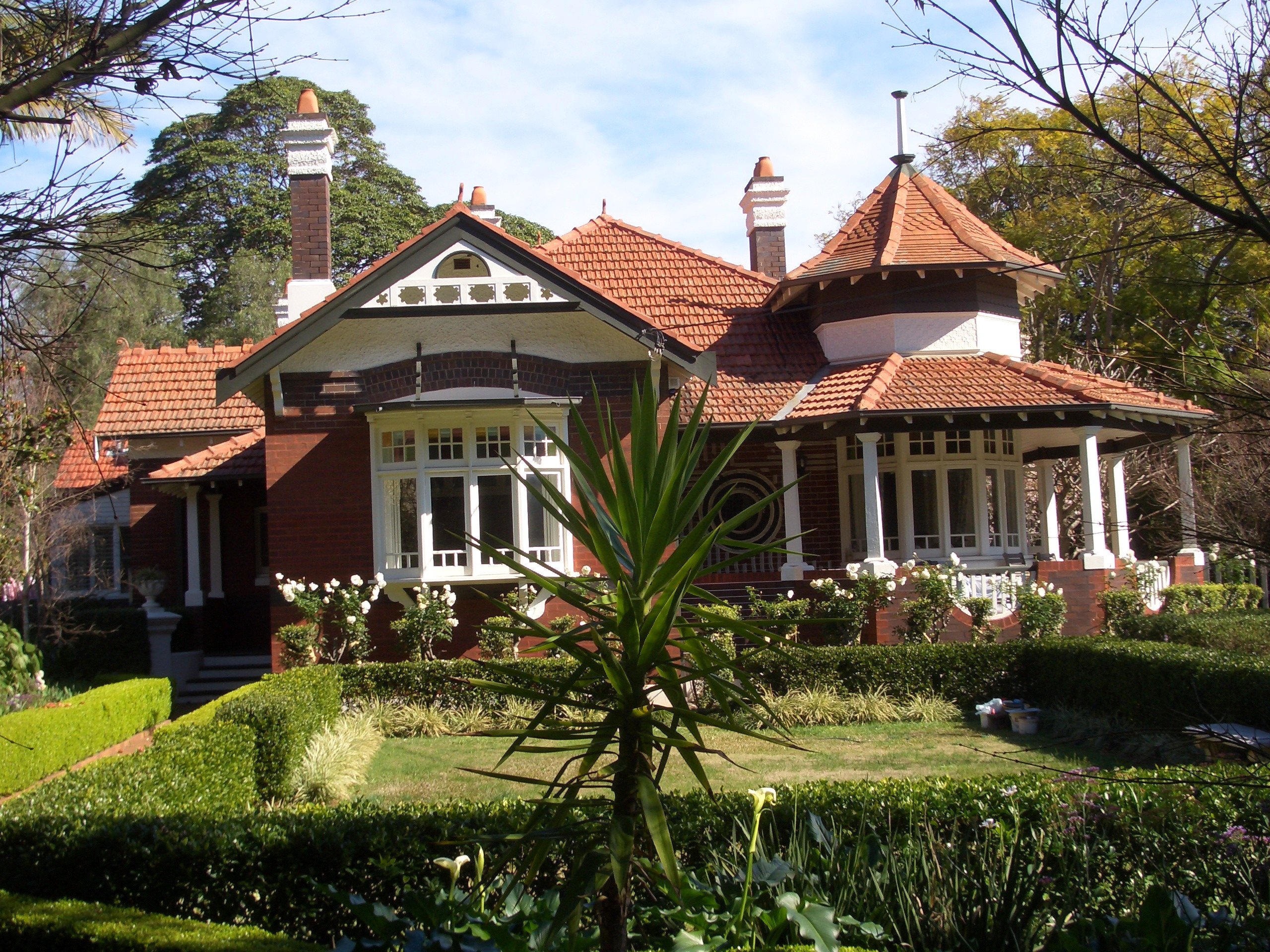
'Alba Longa', a very exuberant example of Queen Anne style architecture

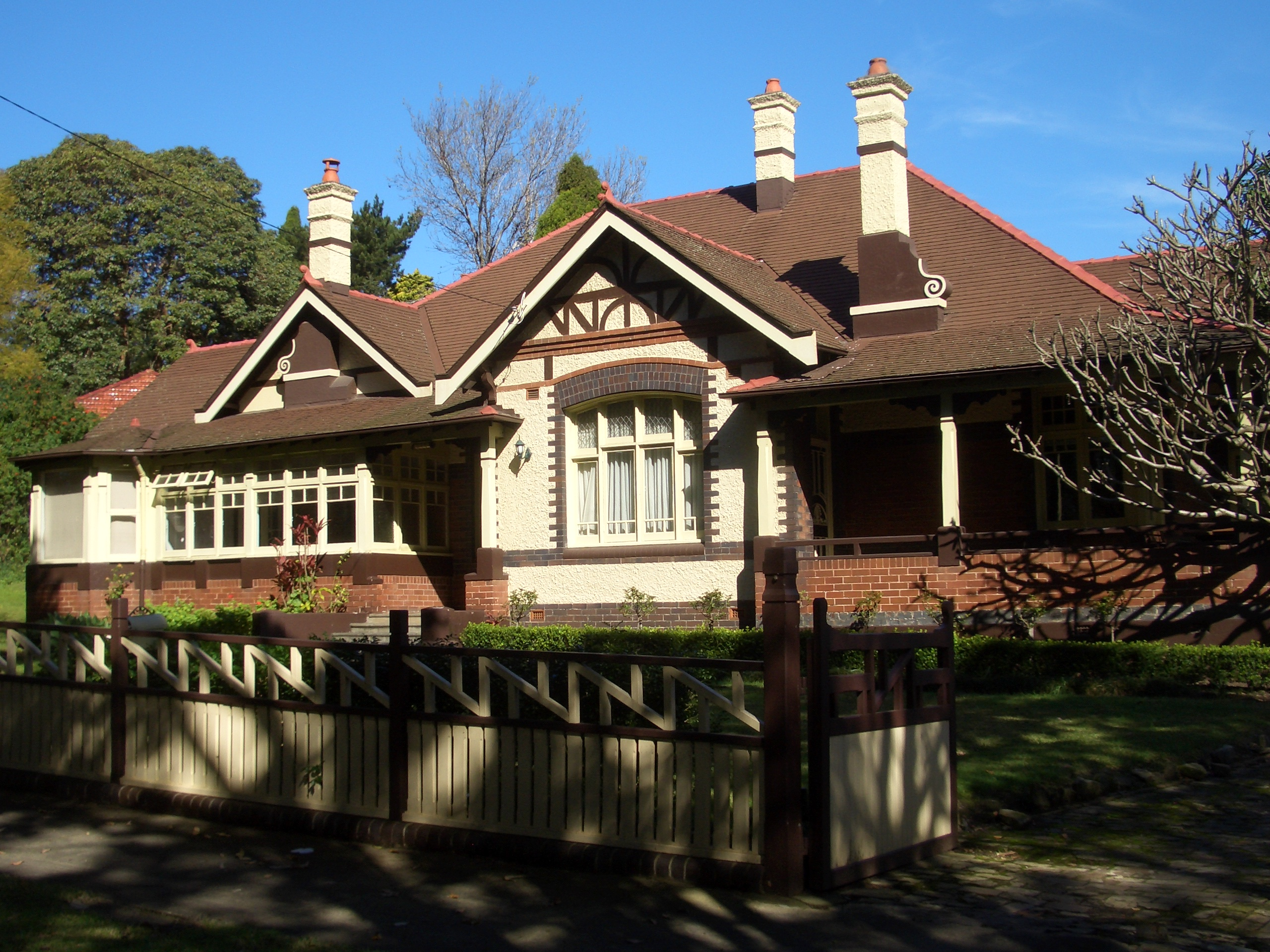
'Amalfi'

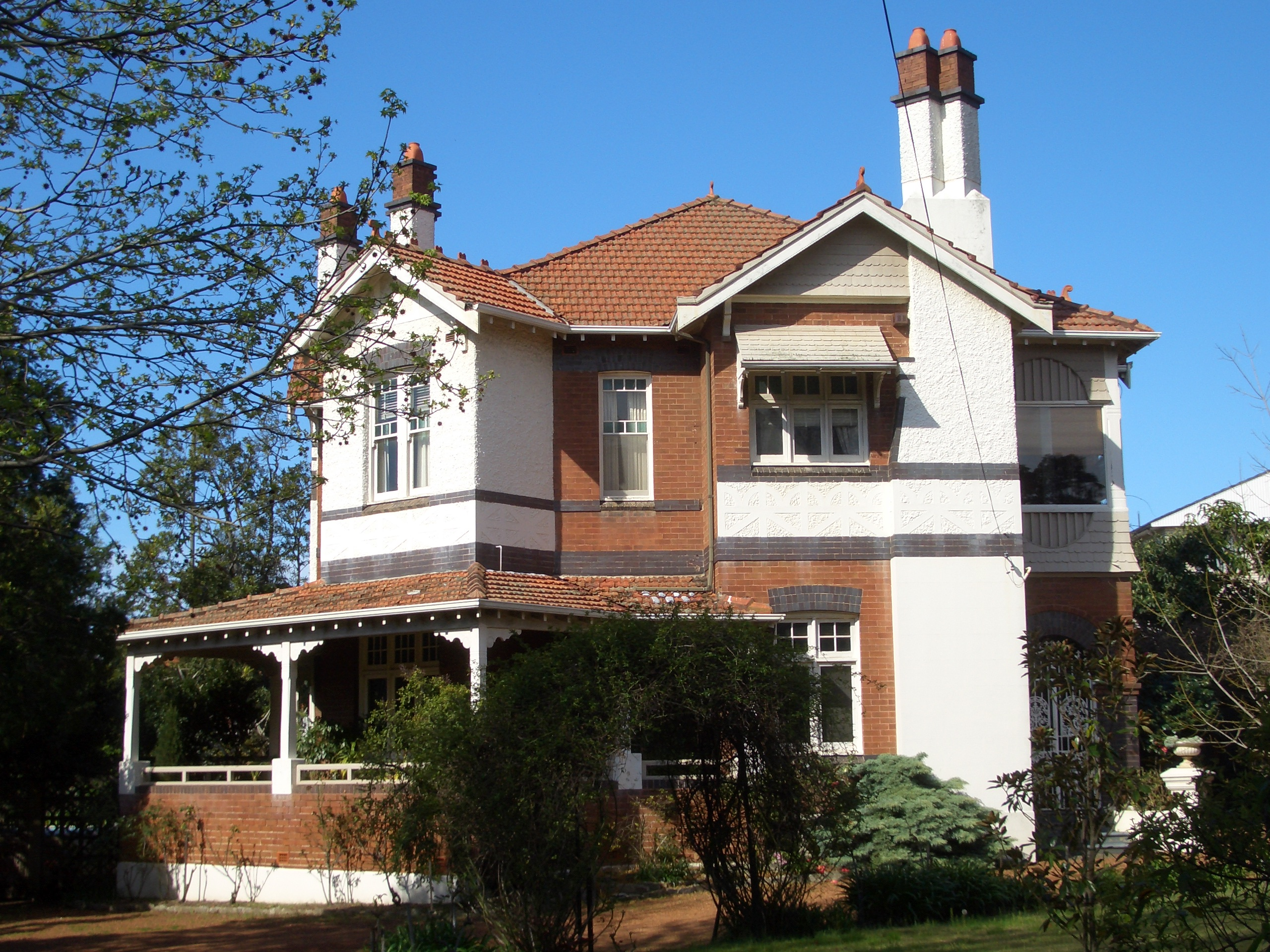
'Brianza'

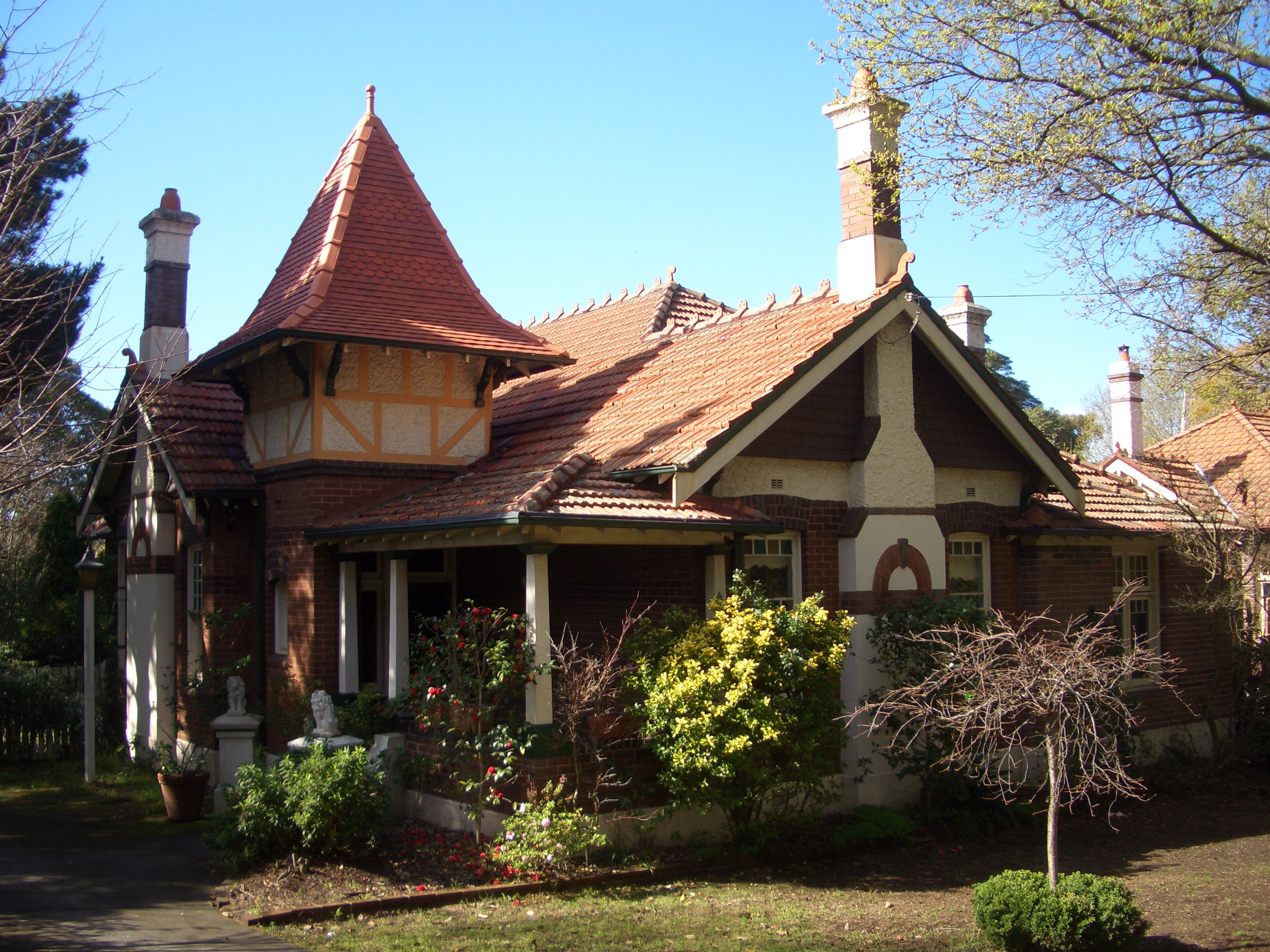
'Vallambrosa'

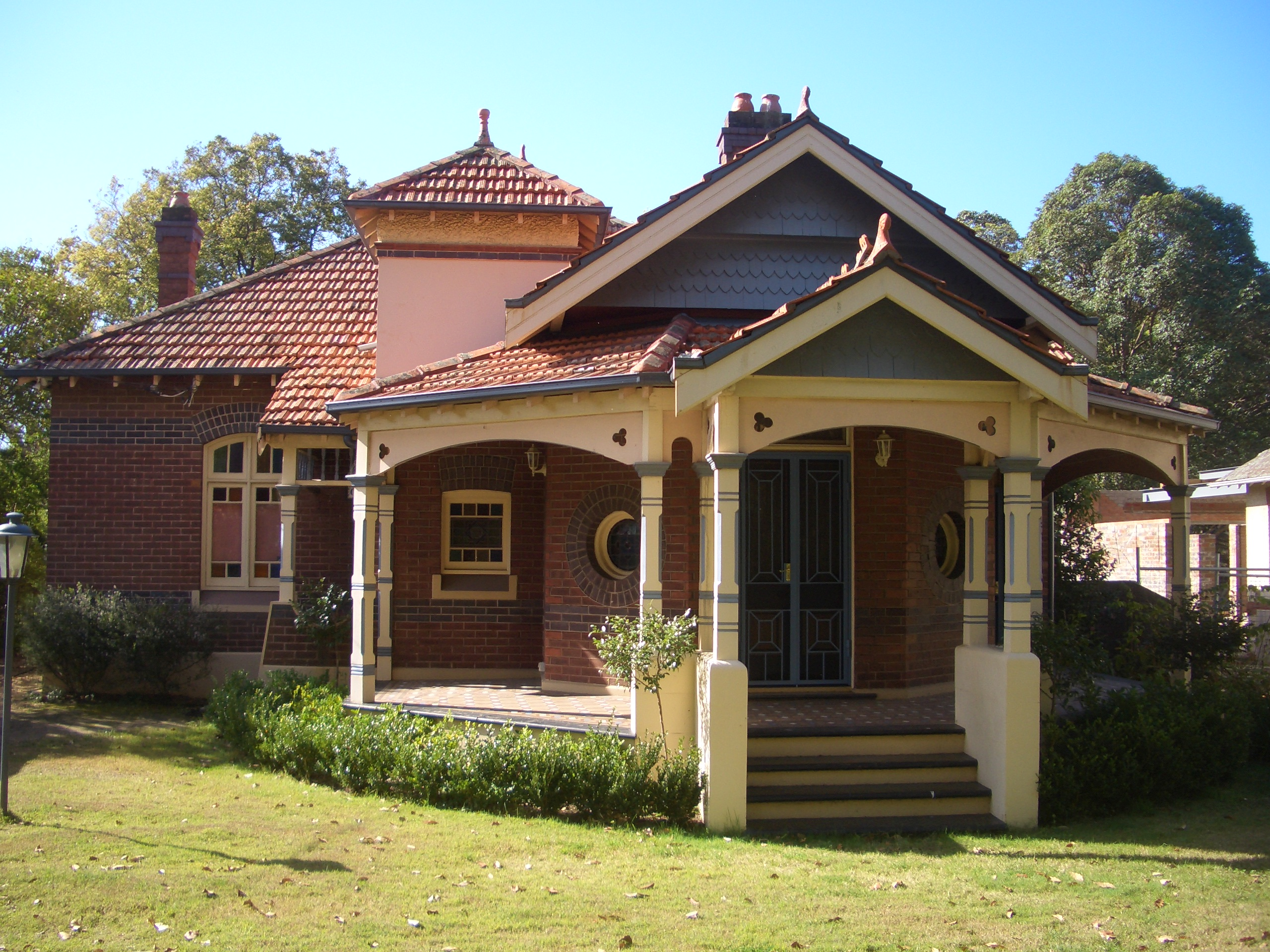
'Capri'

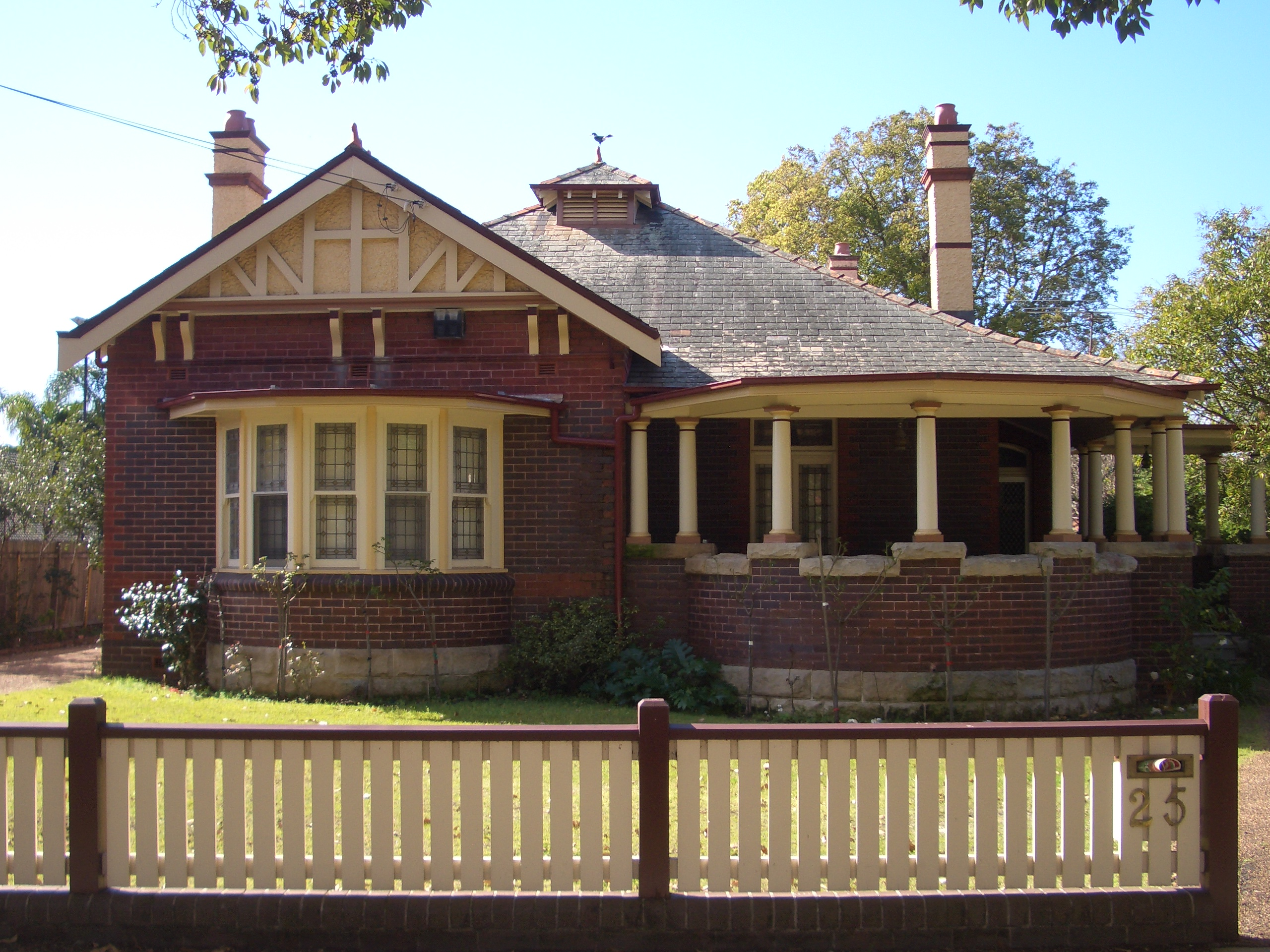
'Atella'

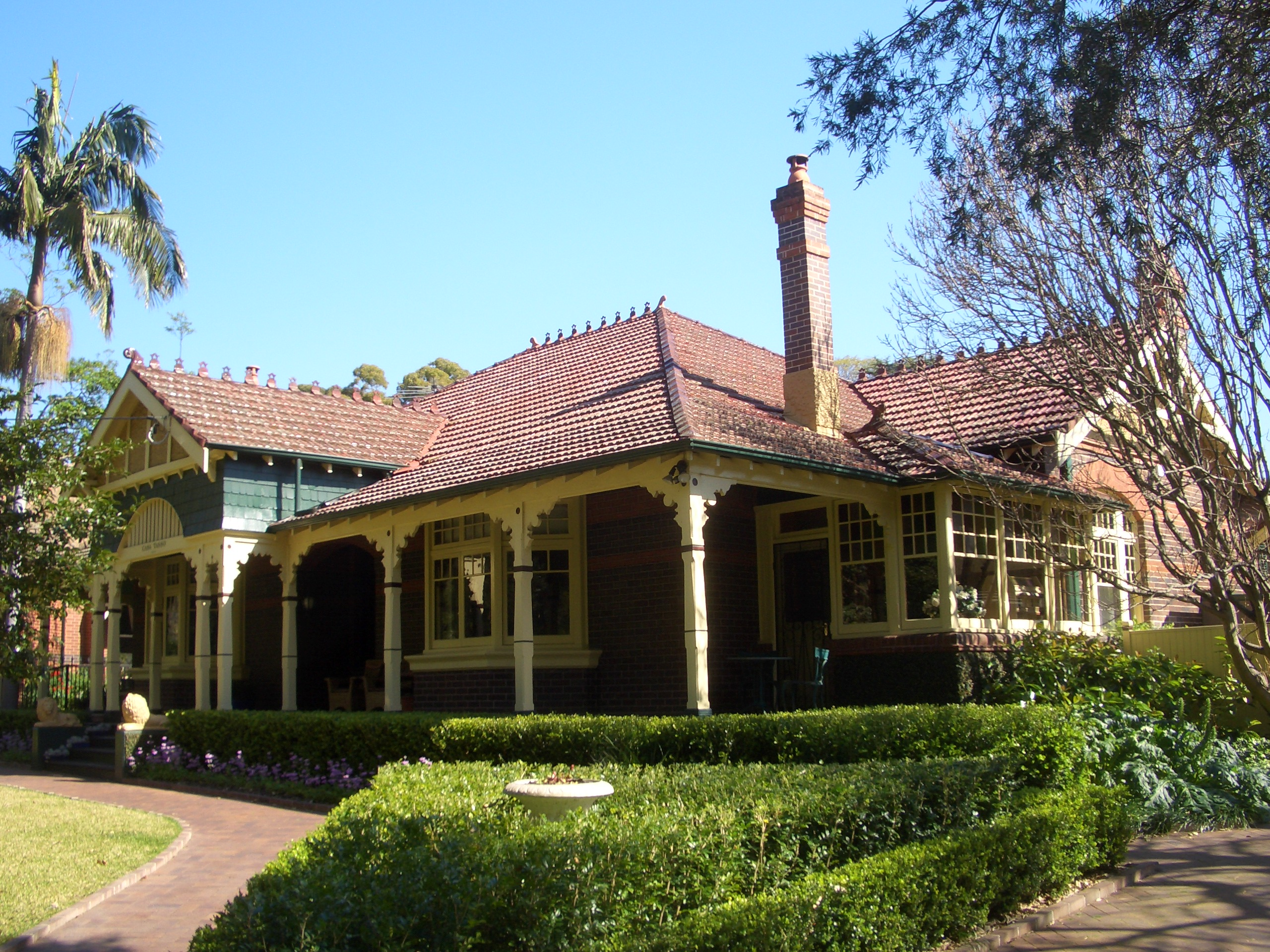
'Cassa Tasso', Federation Bungalow style, characterised by the prominent verandah

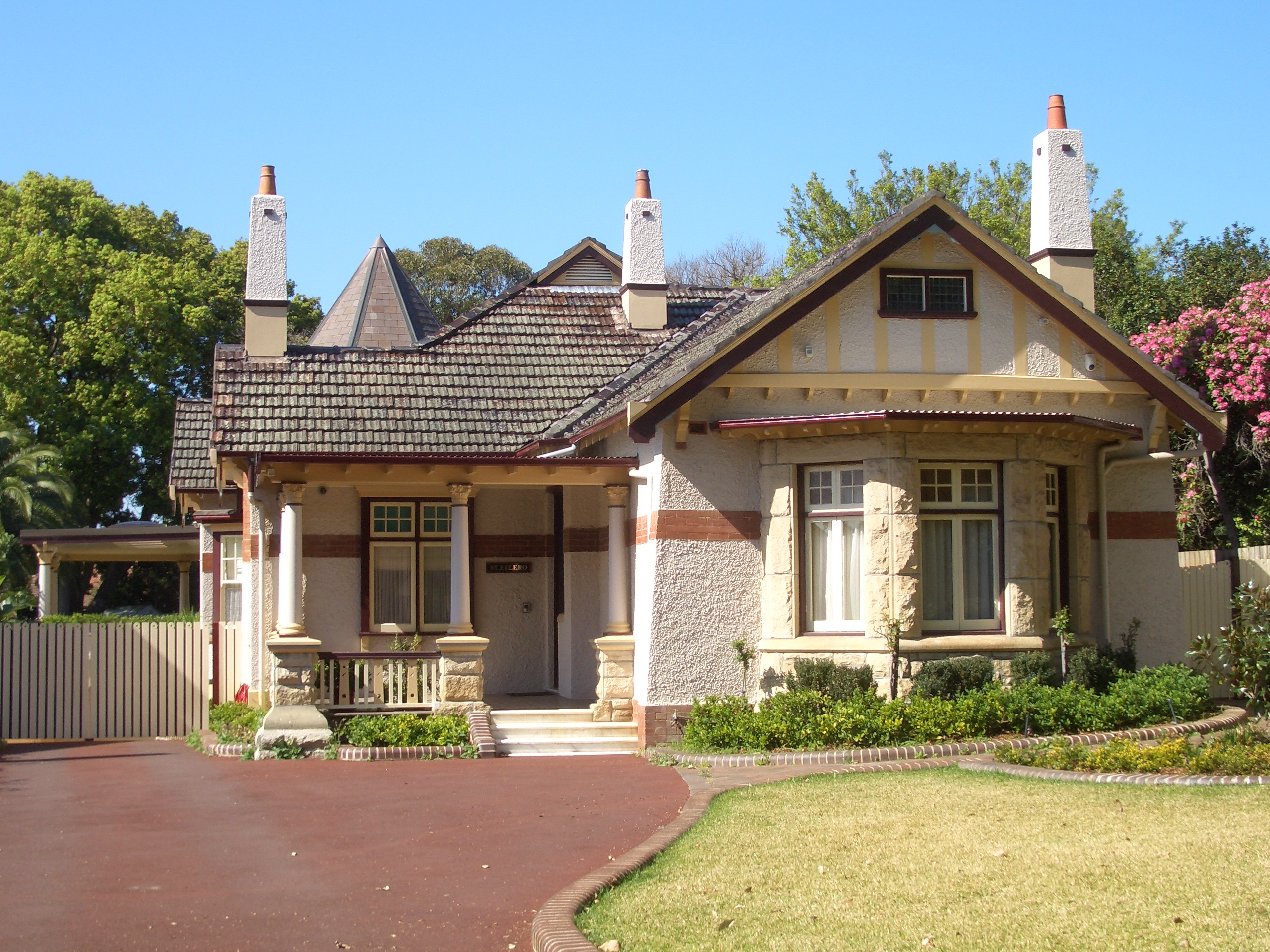
'St Ellero', Federation Arts and Crafts style

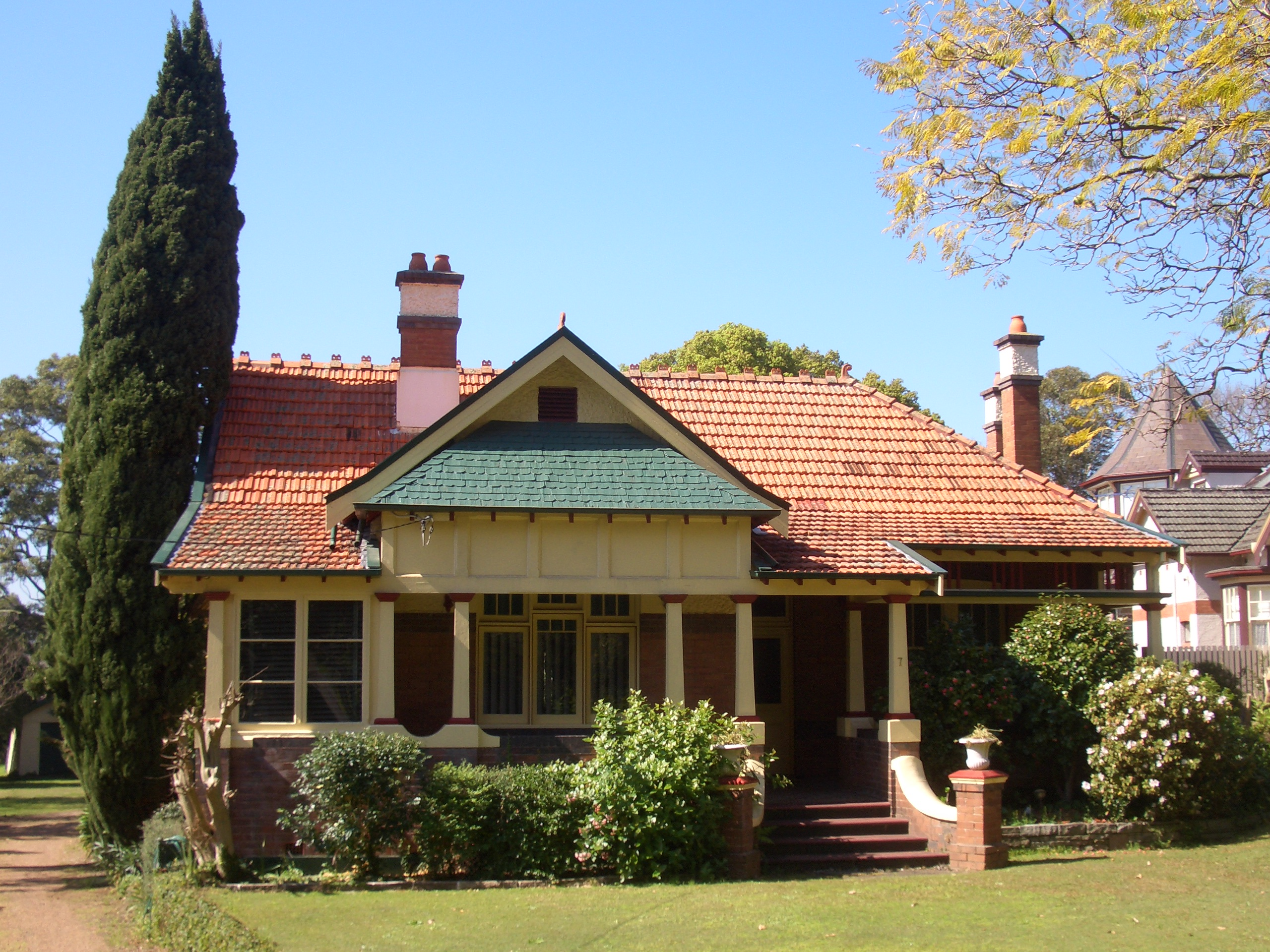
'Mevania' – Originally the home of George Hoskin's niece, Florence Crago, the daughter of Charles Hoskins.

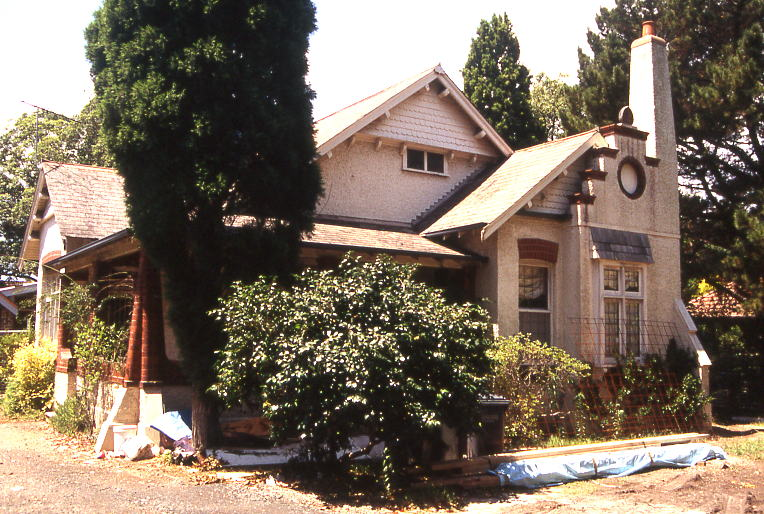
'Erica', Federation Arts and Crafts style

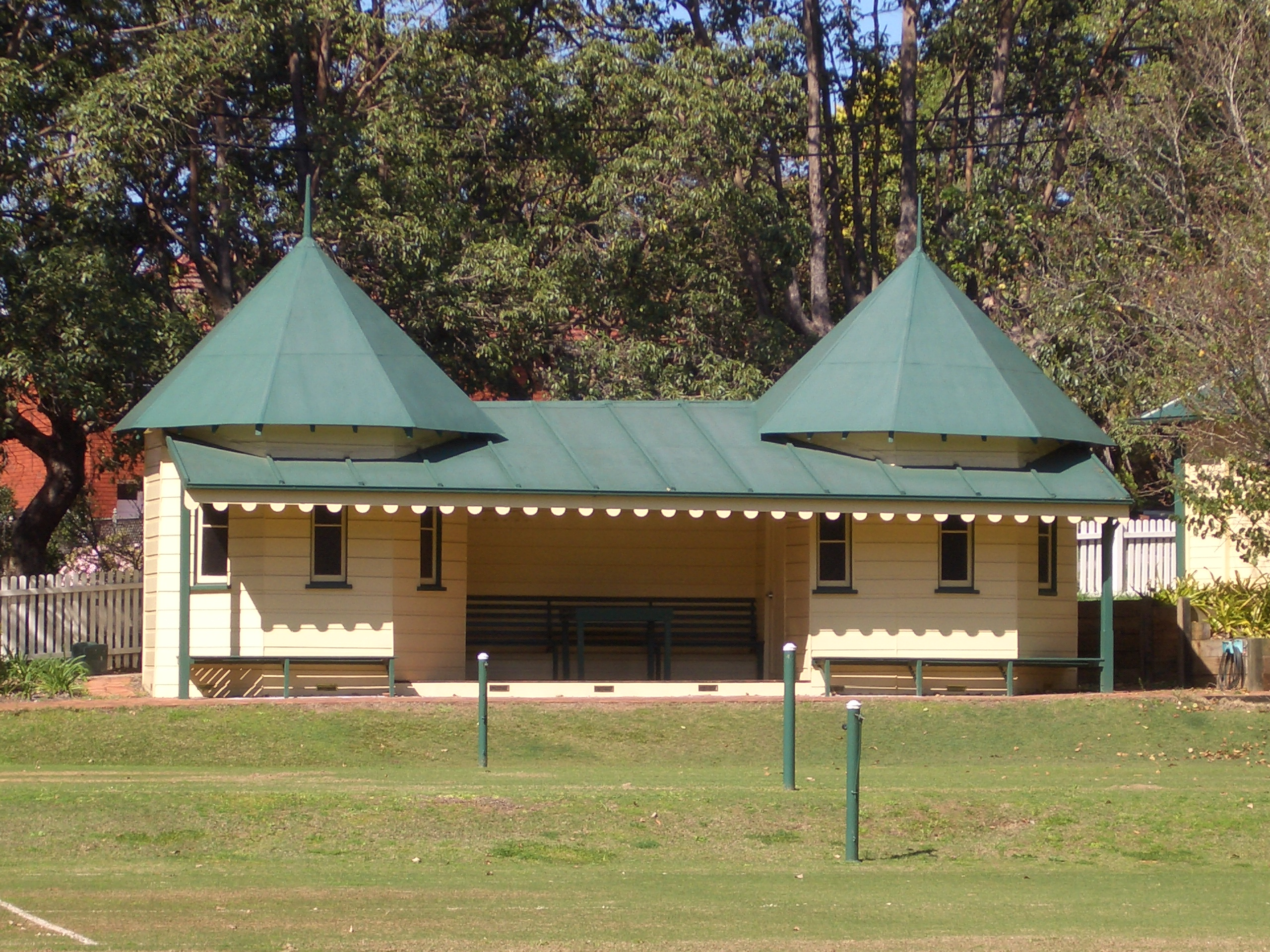
Tennis Club

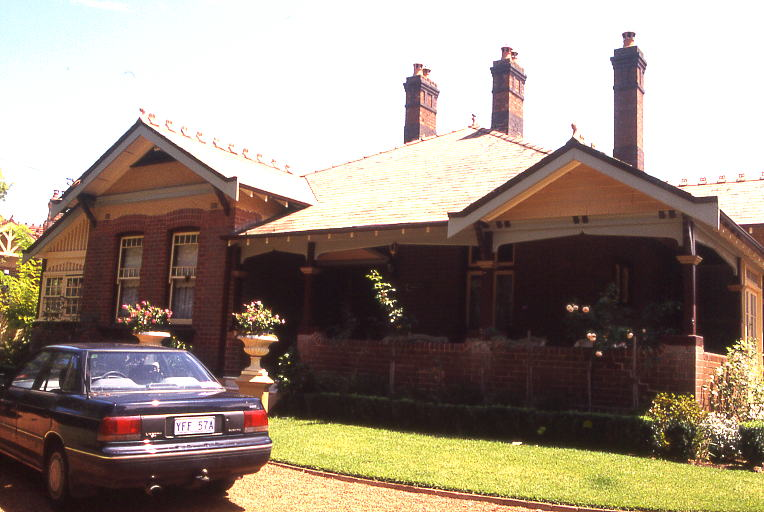
'Ostia', also a Federation Bungalow

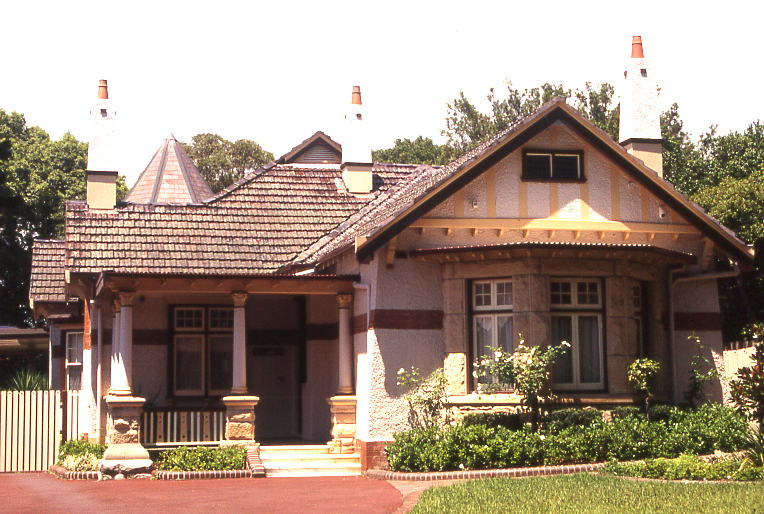
'St Ellero', Federation Arts and Crafts style

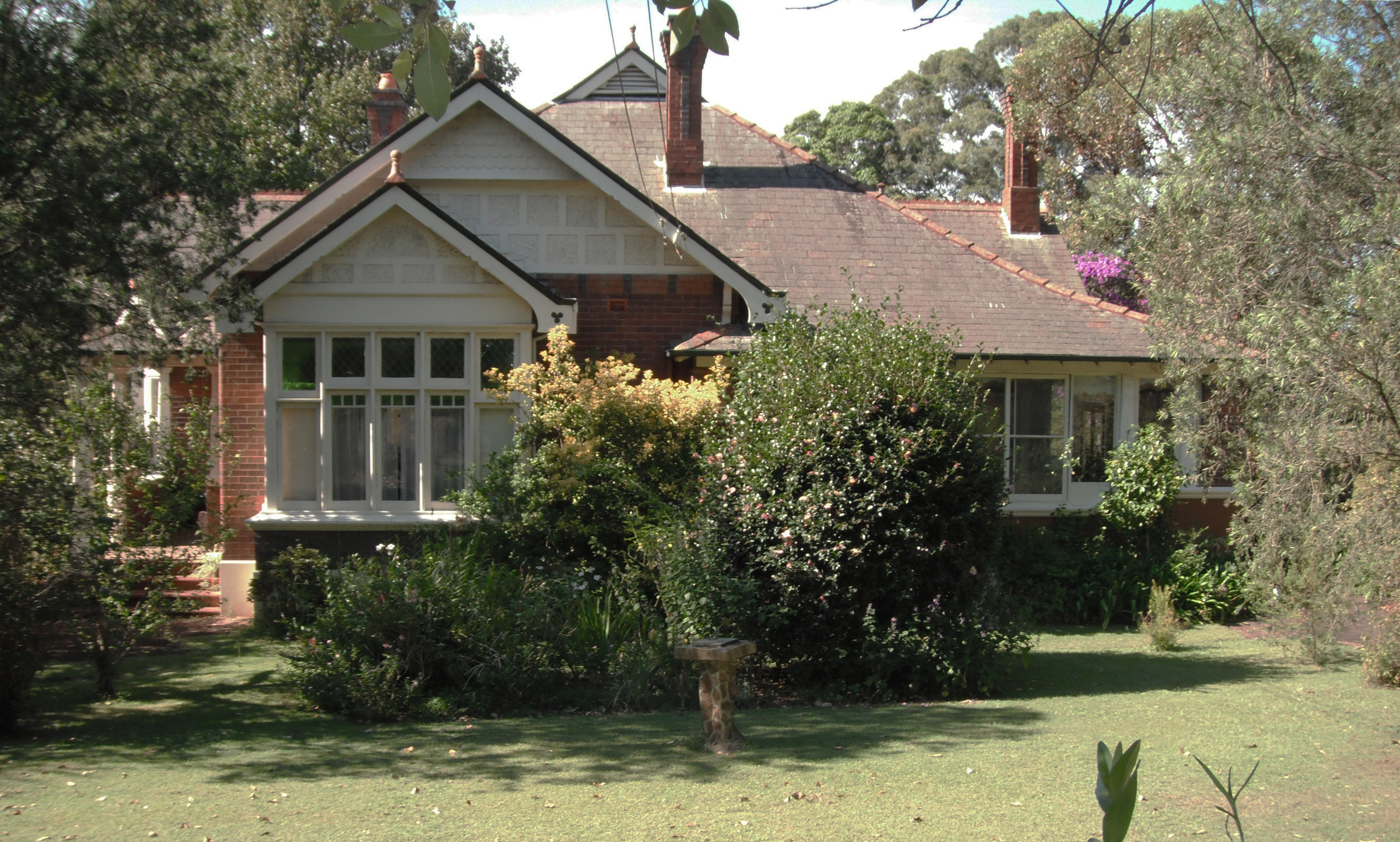
'Del Osa'

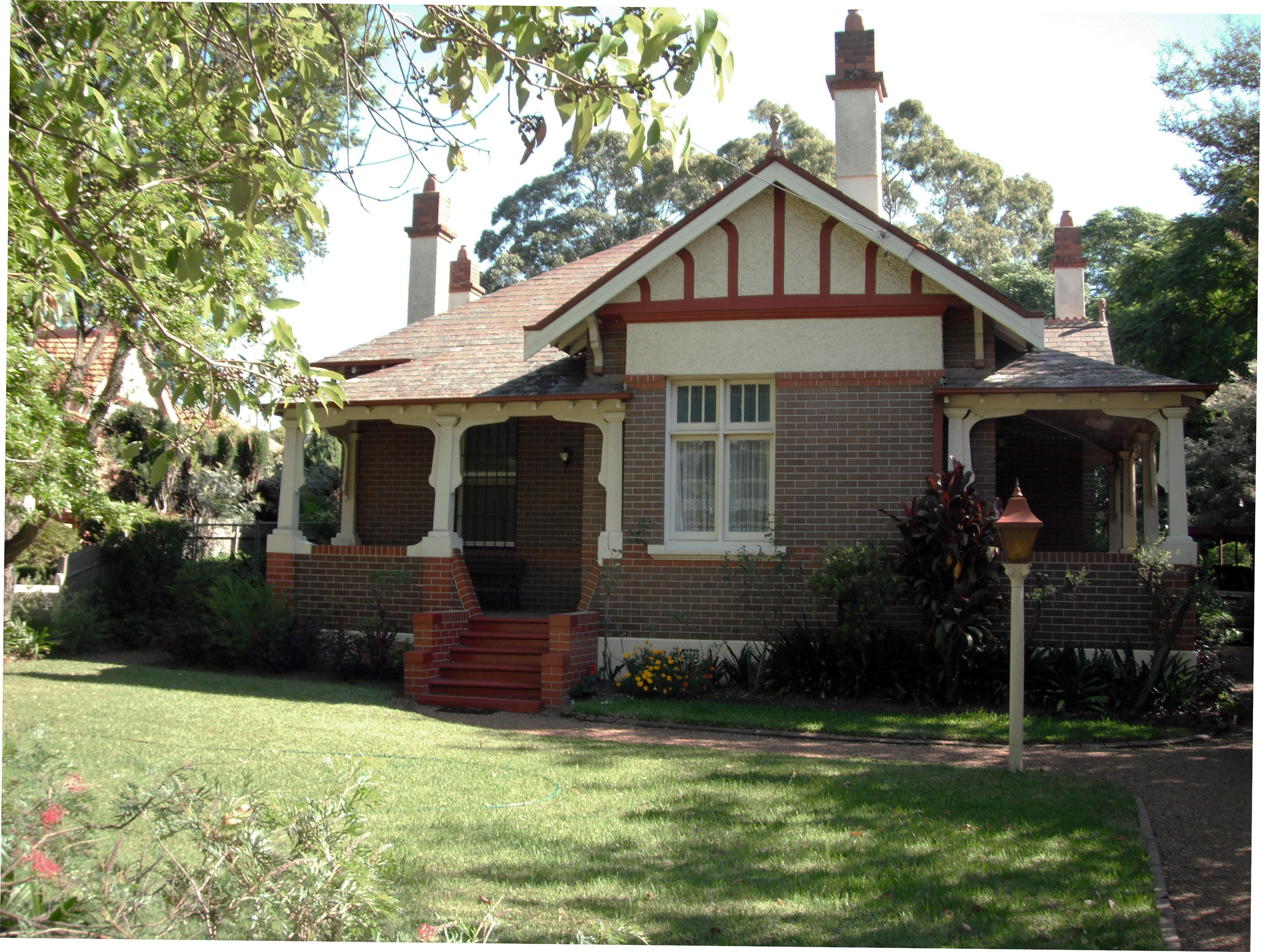
'Ariccia', also Queen Anne

See also: Gallery of Appian Way Houses and see also Federation-house.Wikispaces
