= Burwood rail underbridge =

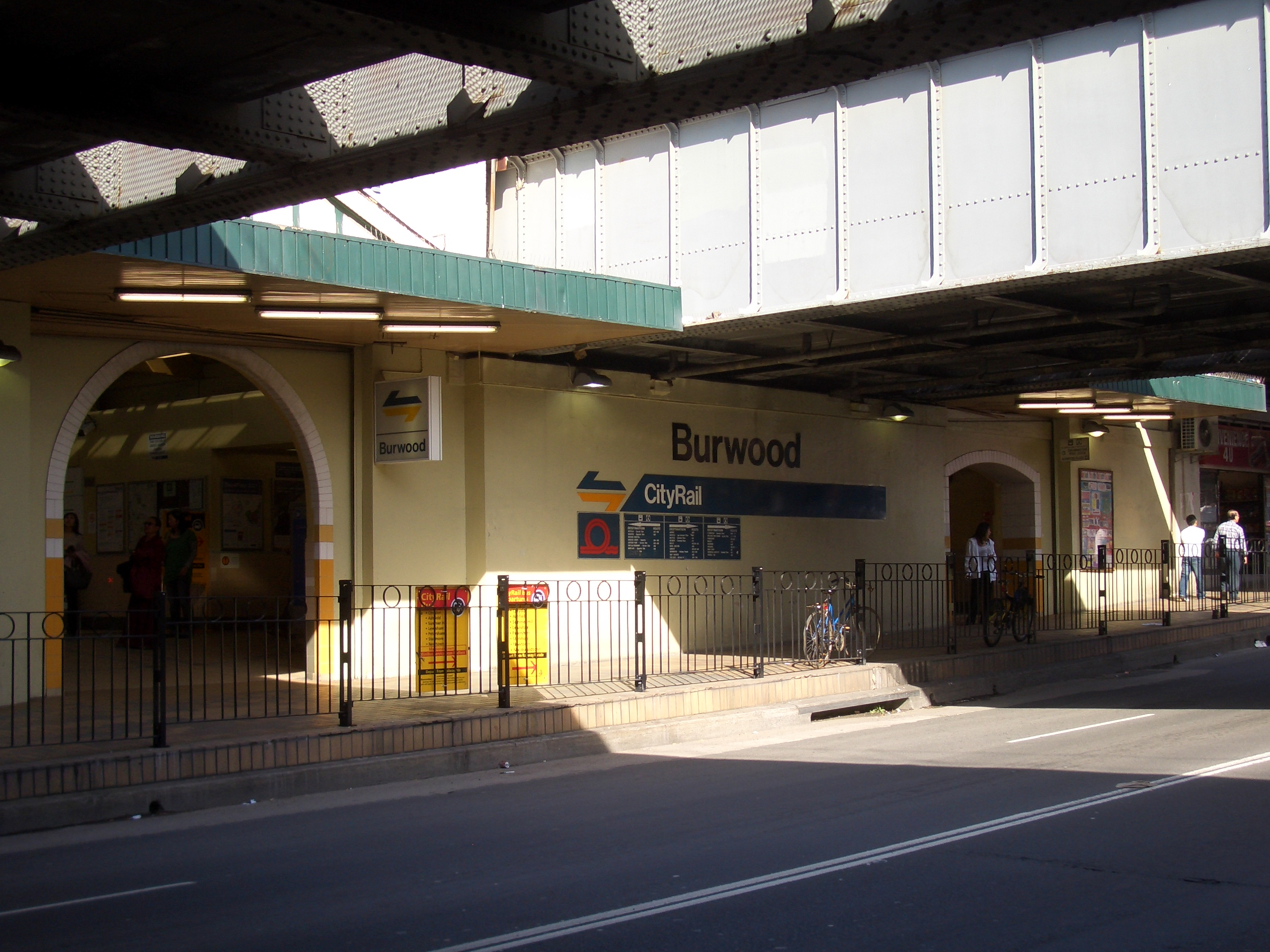
- Part of the underbridge, pictured top of image, August 2007
- Coordinates: 33°52′38″S 151°06′14″E
- Carries: Burwood Road
- Crosses: Main Southern Line; Main Western Line
- Locale: Burwood, Municipality of Burwood, New South Wales, Australia
- Owner: Transport Asset Manager of New South Wales

Characteristics
- Design: Triple-plate web girder underbridge
- Material: Wrought iron and steel
- Trough construction: Concrete
- No. of spans: 1

Rail characteristics
- No. of tracks: 6
- Track gauge: 4 ft 8 1/2 in (1,435 mm) standard gauge

History
- Constructed by: John Ahern
- Construction start: 1892
- Construction end: 1926

New South Wales Heritage Register
- Official name: Burwood rail underbridge
- Type: State heritage (built)
- Designated: 2 April 1999
- Reference no.: 1030
- Type: Railway Bridge/Viaduct
- Category: Transport – Rail
- Builders: John Ahern

Location
- Interactive map of Burwood rail underbridge

The Burwood rail underbridge is a heritage-listed railway underbridge located on the Main Southern and Main Western railway lines in the Sydney suburb of Burwood, New South Wales, Australia. The triple-girder underbridge spans Burwood Road. The railway bridge was built from 1892 to 1926 by John Ahern. The property is owned by Transport Asset Manager of New South Wales, an agency of the Government of New South Wales. It was added to the New South Wales State Heritage Register on 2 April 1999.

== Description ==
The Burwood rail underbridge is a single-span 21.9-metre (72 ft) metal, half-through plate web girder. It carries the double Main Suburban line (middle two of the six tracks) on a three-girder arrangement – outer girder, down suburban, inner girder, up suburban, outer girder. The term "metal" has been used to draw attention to the fact that the outer girders were part of an 1892 wrought iron bridge whereas the 1926 inner girder is steel. The cross girders carry a concrete deck supporting ballasted tracks. On the north side of the Up outer girder is the makers plate – John Ahern 1892 Govt Contract.

=== Condition ===
As at 27 March 2006, the physical condition is good.

== Heritage listing ==
As at 27 March 2006, The Burwood rail underbridge is an example of triple-girder bridge. Constructed as a plate web girder bridge, it is a major example of a main line bridge.

Burwood rail underbridge was listed on the New South Wales State Heritage Register on 2 April 1999 having satisfied the following criteria.

The place is important in demonstrating the course, or pattern, of cultural or natural history in New South Wales.

The Maker's Plate on the triple-girder plate web girder bridge over Burwood Road is historically rare.

The place possesses uncommon, rare or endangered aspects of the cultural or natural history of New South Wales.

Triple-girder bridges are relatively rare, there being two others on this rail corridor (located at Burren Street, Macdonaldtown and Old Canterbury Road, Lewisham) and another just past Strathfield over Powells Creek. The oldest triple-girder plate web girder bridge is the 1879 wrought iron structure over Ultimo Road, originally built for the double-track goods line to Darling Harbour now giving single-track access to the Powerhouse Museum.

The place is important in demonstrating the principal characteristics of a class of cultural or natural places/environments in New South Wales.

Plate web girders are a common, basic railway bridge usually with only two parallel girders, be they single or double track bridges. The Burwood rail underbridge represents the triple-girder type.

== Gallery ==
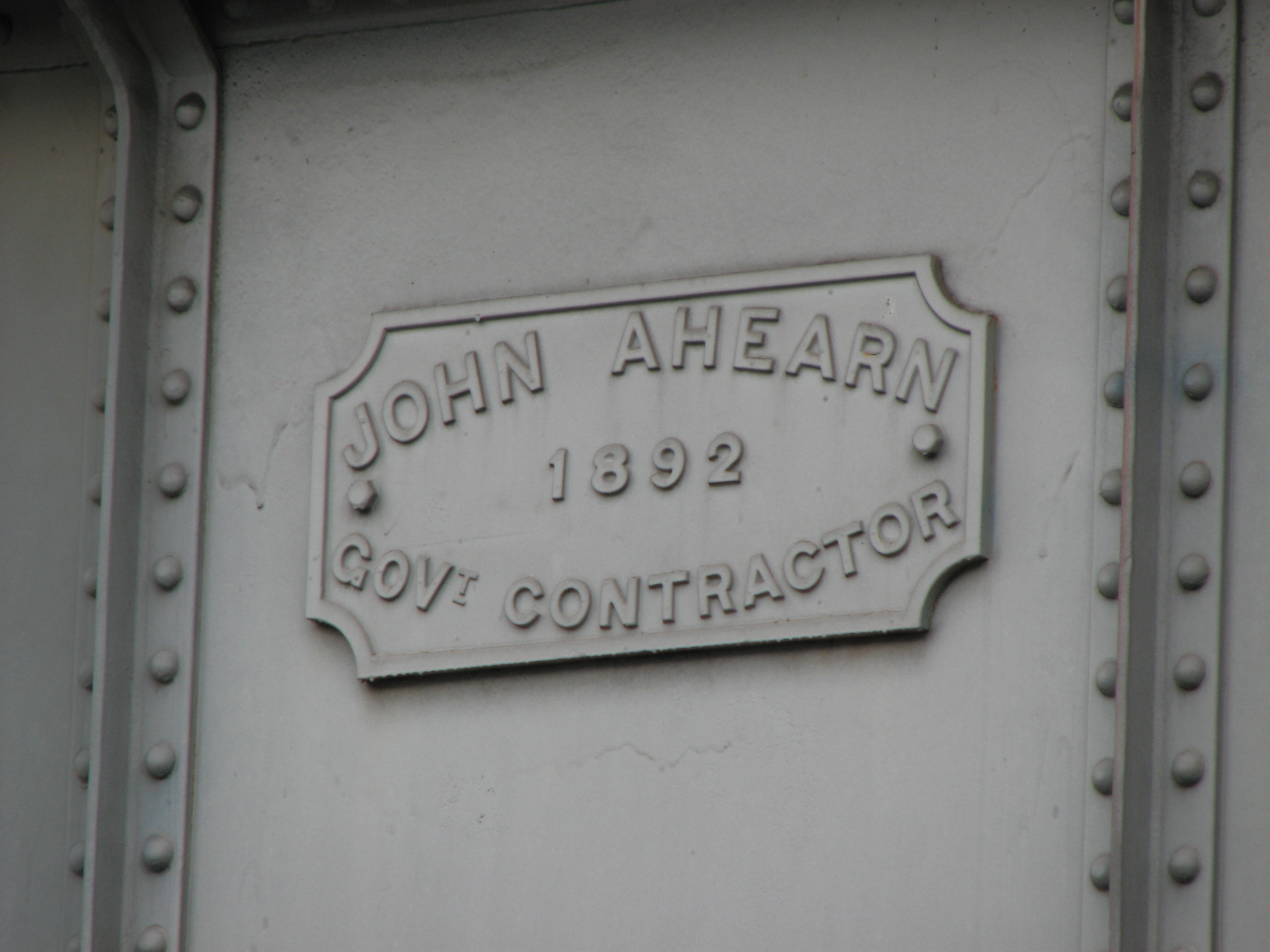
Inscription on underbridge: "John Ahearn 1892 Govt. Contractor"

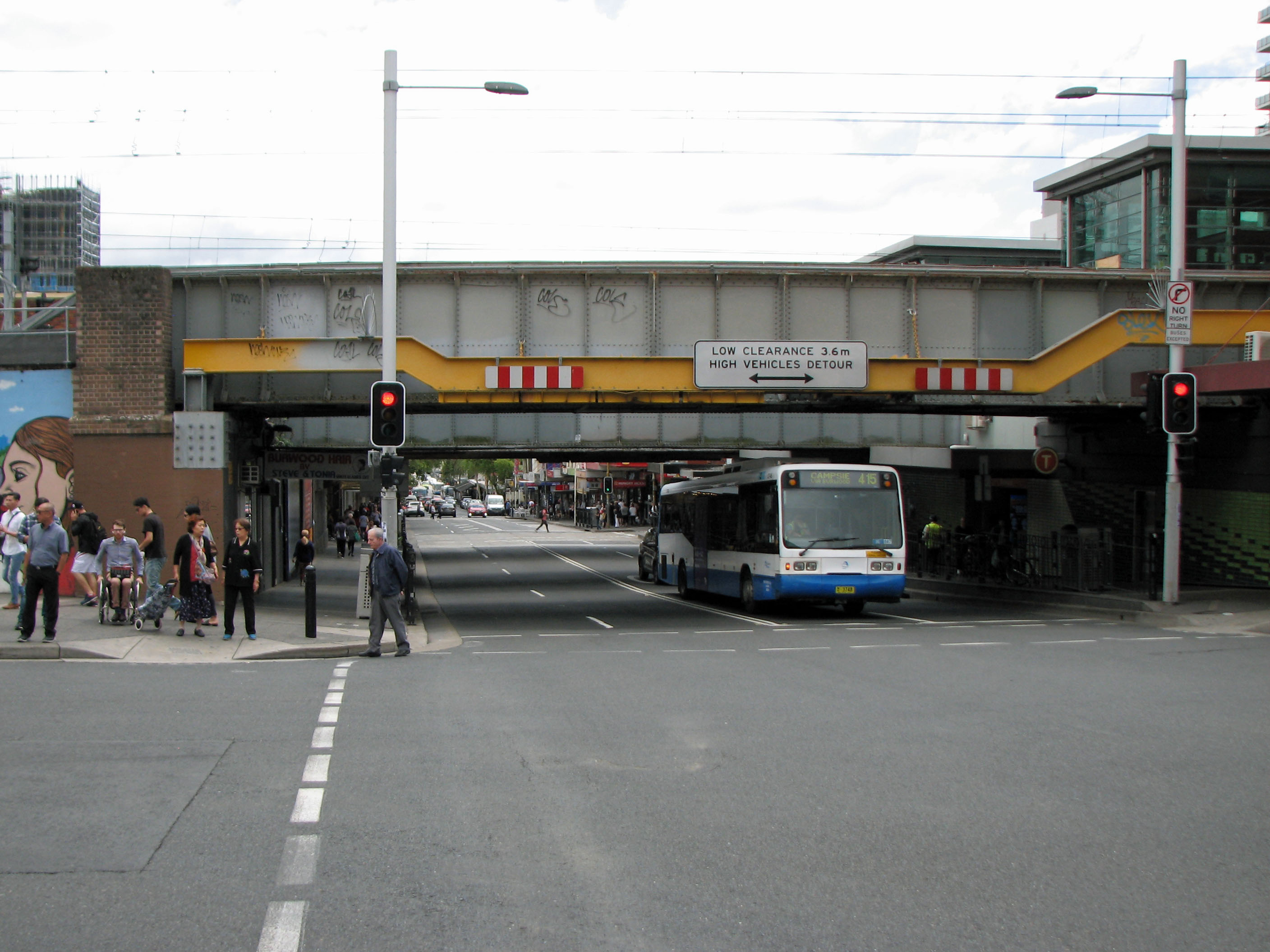
View of the underbridge crossing Burwood Rd, Burwood, NSW

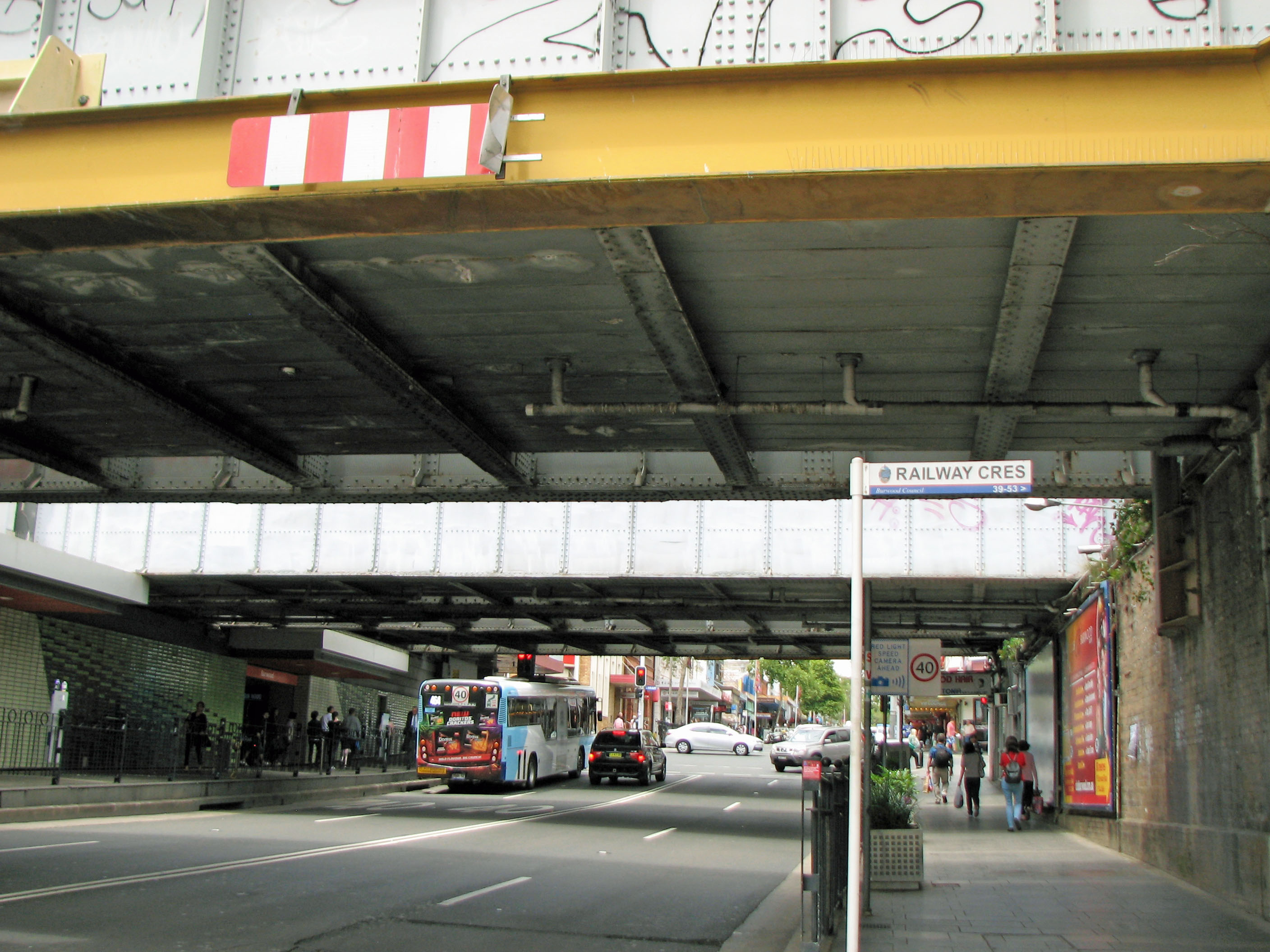
View of the underbridge crossing Burwood Rd, Burwood, NSW

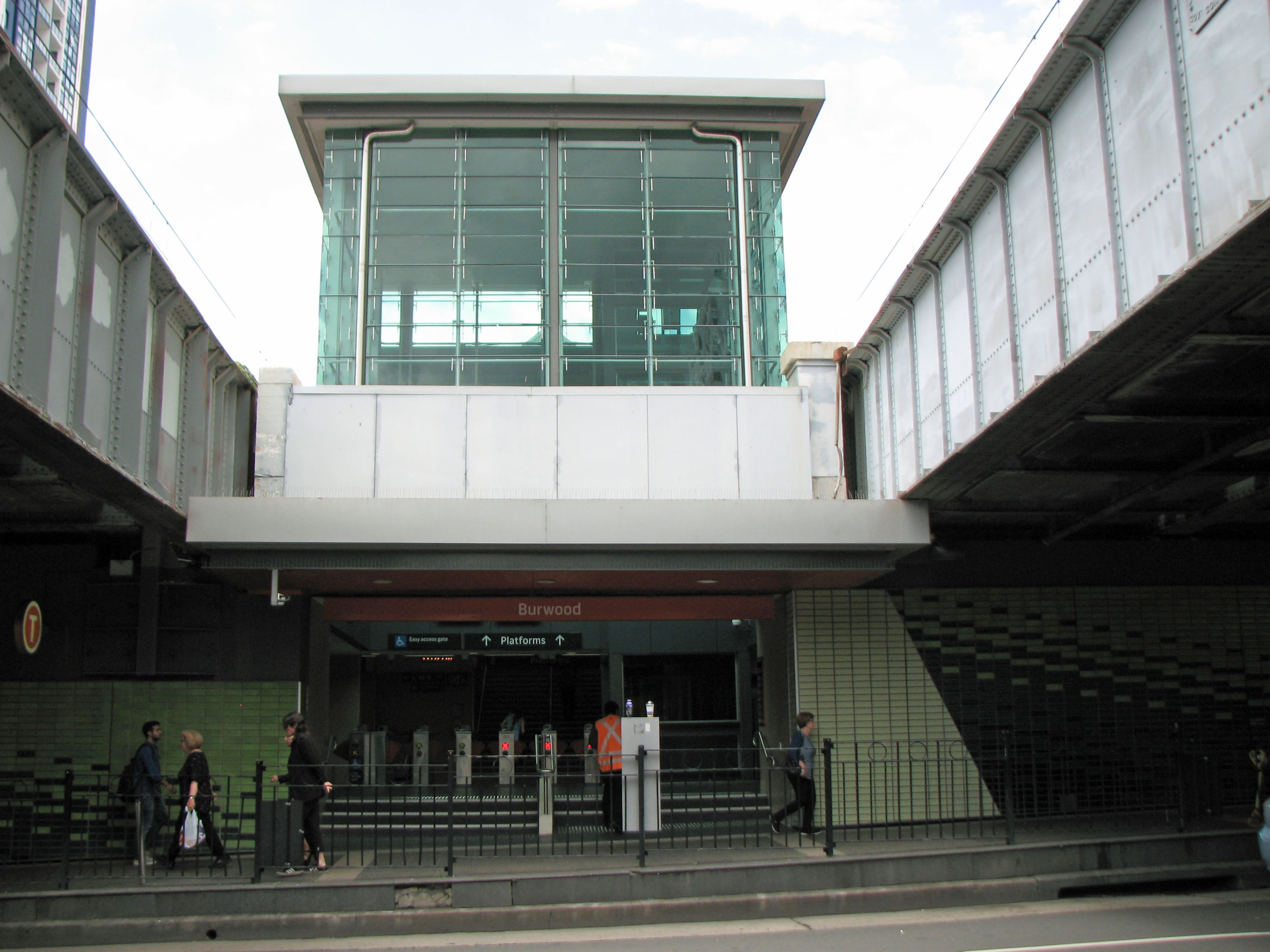
Entrance to Burwood Railway Station, situated between 2 of the bridge spans

== See also ==
- Burwood railway station, Sydney
- Railway bridges in New South Wales
