= Burwood Sewer Vent =

- Location within Sydney Location within Australia
- 33°52′32″S 151°05′52″E
- Location: Railway Parade, Burwood, Municipality of Burwood, New South Wales, Australia

History
- Built: 1919

Site notes
- Architect(s): Metropolitan Board of Water Supply and Sewerage
- Owner: Sydney Water

New South Wales Heritage Register
- Official name: Burwood Sewer Vent; Wentworth Road Sewer Vent; Railway Parade Sewer Vent
- Type: state heritage (built)
- Designated: 15 November 2002
- Reference no.: 1638
- Type: Other - Utilities - Sewerage
- Category: Utilities - Sewerage
- Builders: Metropolitan Board of Water Supply and Sewerage

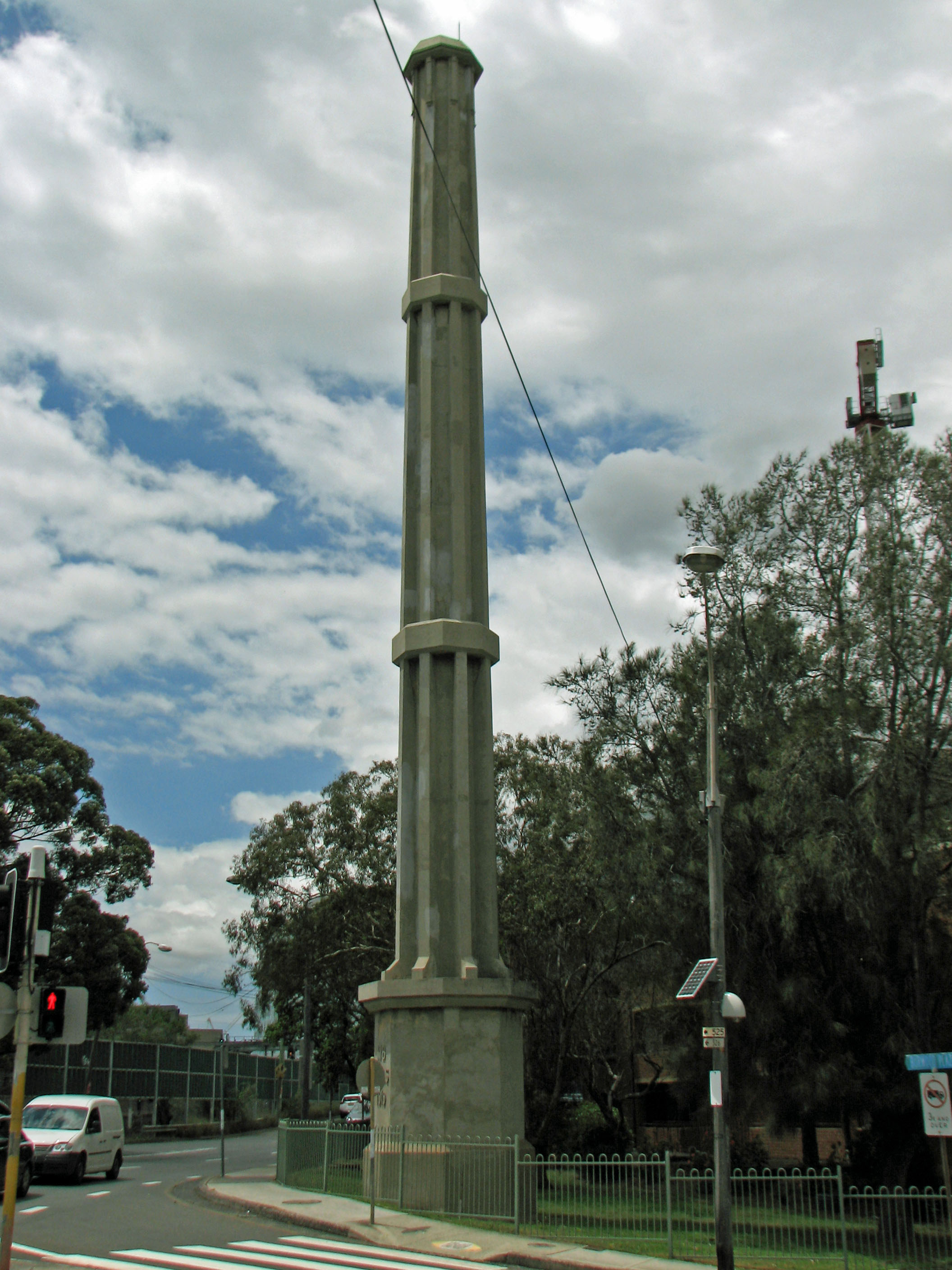
Sewer Vent at the corner of Railway Parade and Wentworth Road, Burwood.

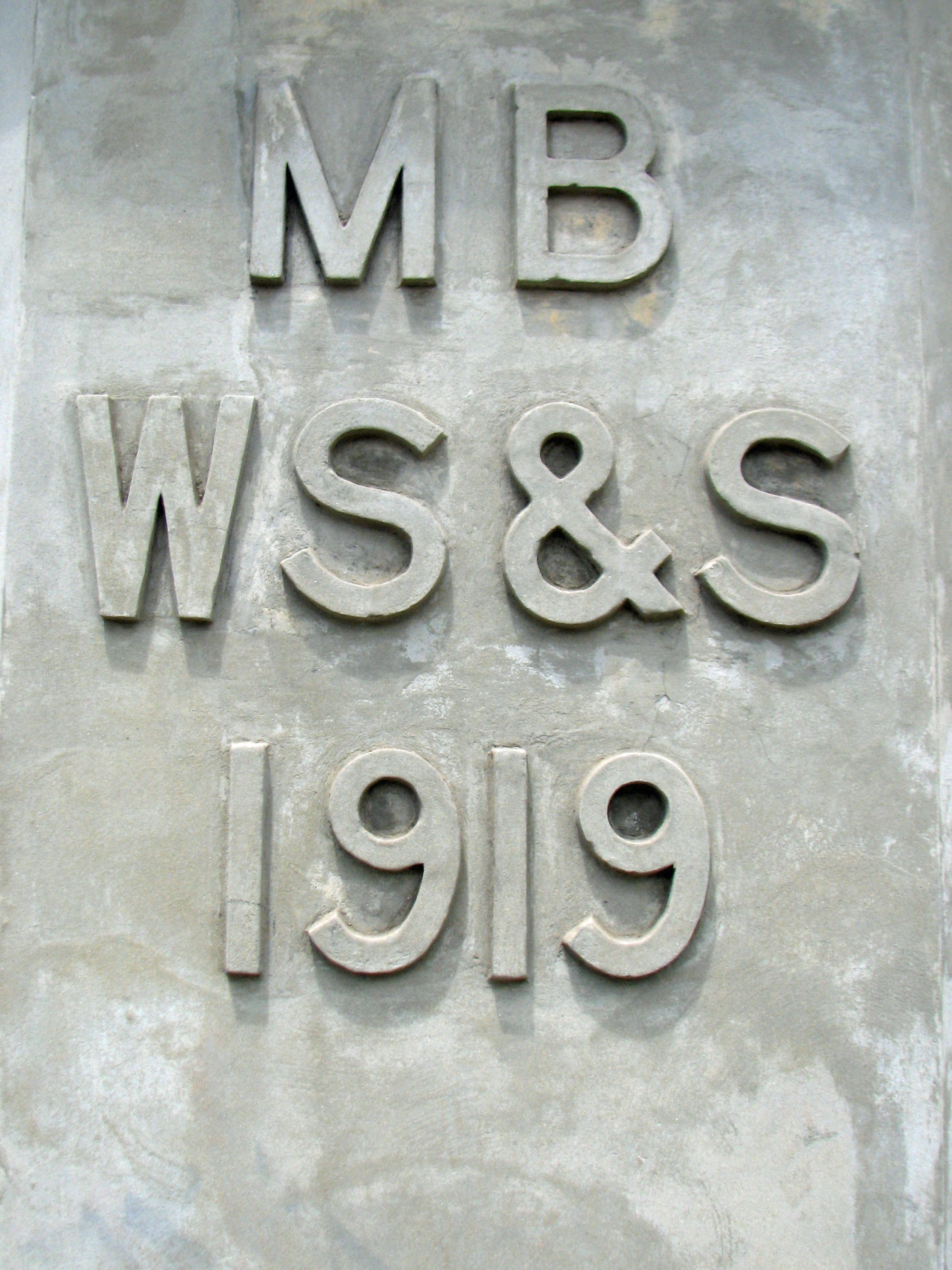
Inscription built into the Burwood sewer vent, Corner Railway Parade and Wentworth Road, Burwood

The Burwood Sewer Vent is a heritage-listed sewer ventilation stack located at Railway Parade in the Sydney suburb of Burwood, New South Wales, Australia. It was designed and built by the Metropolitan Board of Water Supply and Sewerage in 1919. It is also known as Wentworth Road Sewer Vent and Railway Parade Sewer Vent. The property is owned by Sydney Water, a statutory corporation of the Government of New South Wales. It was added to the New South Wales State Heritage Register on 15 November 2002.

== History ==
The Main Western Carrier which fed into Botany sewer farm was completed in 1897 and encompasses the major crossing of Wolli Creek and Cooks River each by triple barrel 1800 mm dia. wrought iron/steel aqueducts. There are triple barrel brick arch aqueducts at the ends. Soon after construction more sewage was being collected from this newer Western arm than there was from the original Southern Division arm. This is even with allowing for dramatic increase in flow within the first few years of the Southern Division.

The Western Branch Main Sewer which feeds into the Main Western Carrier was completed in stages all the way through to Strathfield. Work was completed on this sewer in 1904.

The section also contains the Croydon (1922) and Burwood (Strathfield) (1919) concrete vent stacks which were built because of damage caused by gases from the then new Homebush Bay Abattoir after it opened in 1916.

In 1888 before the Botany Scheme was even commissioned, Burwood Council had requested a sewage treatment plant for Hen & Chicken Bay on the Parramatta River. They were told by the NSW Government to wait for the Western Suburbs Sewer and the Western Branch Main Sewer is the result of that undertaking. Had the Burwood scheme proceeded, the Western Branch Main Sewer may not have been built in the location it was eventually constructed.

== Description ==
A reinforced concrete vent shaft built in 1919, very similar in design to that at Paisley Road, Croydon. It comprises an octagonal pedestal, at its highest point approximately 5.5m above ground level to the base of a circular shaft in plan with radiating concrete ribs and 2 octagonal concrete bands up the length of the shaft. The capital of the shaft like Paisley Road has neo classical console brackets below a projecting cornice. The entrance door is located on the south east corner with the steel door being original, set into a reinforced concrete projecting frame, whereas Paisley Road is recessed. There is evidence of past patch repair work around numerous areas of the shaft and pedestal, and presently there is evidence of spalling and reinforcement corrosion on the southern wall of the pedestal particularly.

The area surrounding the vent shaft is dominated by late 20th century flats and to the north is the Railway line across Railway Parade. The immediate ground surrounding the shaft is cleared which forms part of a small reserve at the corner of Wentworth Road and Railway Parade. A manhole is located some 15 metres to the east adjacent the footpath to Railway Parade.

A lightning conductor is located on the south east side of the shaft and the south face of the pedestal.

Iron eyelets are fixed to the circular section of the shaft possibly for a former lightning conductor.

The concrete vent stack is prominent some 500 metres north on Wentworth Road and is a landmark set on an open reserve fronting Railway Parade. The siting of the vent shaft is presently somewhat isolated as part of the reserve fronting Railway Parade and opposite the Railway line at a considerable road intersection.

The concrete vent shaft in itself is considerably intact and in fair condition although in need of some maintenance to doors and concrete.

Considerably intact.

=== Further information ===
Undertake a conservation plan for the item should the property be proposed for sale.

== Heritage listing ==
As at 4 May 2005, the vent shaft is a locally prominent landmark, and one of only two like structures in Sydney Water's system, which plays an important function to the main western sewer system. The unusual design and reinforced concrete construction is rare for this type of vent in a State context.

Burwood Sewer Vent was listed on the New South Wales State Heritage Register on 15 November 2002 having satisfied the following criteria.

The place is important in demonstrating the course, or pattern, of cultural or natural history in New South Wales.

The vent has tangible historical associations with the western branch main sewer and through the influence of sewer gases generated from the Homebush abattoir, an element which has now been removed forever.

The place is important in demonstrating aesthetic characteristics and/or a high degree of creative or technical achievement in New South Wales.

The vent holds a prominent position on the corner of Wentworth Road and Railway Parade, and is a substantial local landmark.

The place has a strong or special association with a particular community or cultural group in New South Wales for social, cultural or spiritual reasons.

It is likely the vent stack holds some value to the local community in its function and landmark value.

The place has potential to yield information that will contribute to an understanding of the cultural or natural history of New South Wales.

The vent plays an important function in the servicing of the western branch main sewer.

The place possesses uncommon, rare or endangered aspects of the cultural or natural history of New South Wales.

Regarding its design and construction it is rare on a State level and one of only two in the Sydney Water system.

The place is important in demonstrating the principal characteristics of a class of cultural or natural places/environments in New South Wales.

In terms of vent function alone, it is representative of the function it has played in the operation of sewer systems.

== See also ==
- Sydney Water
