= St. Cloud, Burwood =

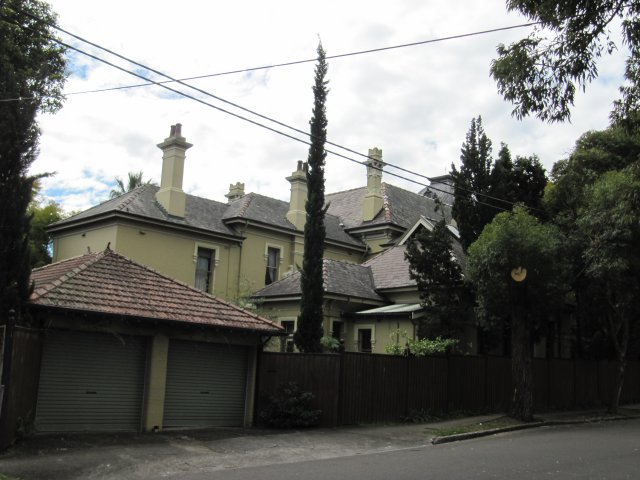

- Location within Sydney Location within Australia
- 33°53′10″S 151°06′05″E
- Location: 223 Burwood Road, Burwood, Municipality of Burwood, New South Wales, Australia

History
- Built: 1892-93

New South Wales Heritage Register
- Official name: St. Cloud and Site; St Cloud and site
- Type: State heritage (built)
- Designated: 2 April 1999
- Reference no.: 564
- Type: Mansion
- Category: Residential buildings (private)
- Builders: George Hoskins

St. Cloud is a heritage-listed mansion located at 223 Burwood Road in the Sydney suburb of Burwood in the Municipality of Burwood local government area of New South Wales, Australia. It was built by George Hoskins. It is also known as St. Cloud and Site and St Cloud and site. It was added to the New South Wales State Heritage Register on 2 April 1999.

== History ==
Tree-lined streets such as Burwood Rd., The Appian Way or The Boulevard in Strathfield were in marked contrast to most development in Australian cities of the late 19th century.

=== St. Cloud ===
St. Cloud was built by industrialist George Hoskins, remembered for his work establishing the steel industry (Australian Iron & Steel Company) in Lithgow and Port Kembla with his brother Charles Hoskins and for his Appian Way subdivision adjoining St. Cloud - the Hoskins estate (1904+). George & his brother were involved in constructing the open aqueducts carrying Sydney's Nepean Water supply to its suburbs (from 1886) and were well aware of the benefits of reticulated waters supply on suburbs such as Burwood, Croydon, Concord. A water main was laid down Liverpool Road (nearby to the south of St.Cloud), down Burwood Road (past St. Cloud) and to Parramatta Road.

George and his brother Charles moved to Burwood in 1893, George building and moving into St. Cloud and Charles to Illyria (now Hollyrood), a mansion on The Boulevarde to the west (today part of Santa Sabina Convent, Strathfield).

St. Cloud was used as an administration block for St. Joseph's Convent.

In 1978, it returned to its original role as a private residence.

== Description ==
=== Grounds ===
Facing Burwood Road is a low sandstone fence with Art Nouveau details on its pillars and two cast iron gates leading to a semi-circular entry drive. The garden is dense today with a number of mature trees and shrubs buffering it from busy Burwood Road. These include a firewheel tree (Stenocarpus sinuatus), Grevillea spp., fiddlewood (Citharexylum sp.), Canary Island date palm (Phoenix canariensis), camphor laurels (Cinnamomum camphora), a large lemon-scented gum on the northern boundary (Corymbia citriodora), crepe myrtle (Lagerstroemia indica), tree ferns (Cyathea australis).

=== Mansion ===
An 1892–3 two storey Victorian mansion with a slate roof, elaborate mouldings, cast iron lacework and bay windows. The street facade is dominated by a three-storey tower with a copper clad dome. Attractive mature planting and stone fence enhance its setting. St. Cloud has 9 main rooms, 3 downstairs. A billiards room was added in 1910. Later it became the administrative block for St. Joseph's Convent. In 1978 it returned to being a private residence. The tower has a copper clad dome and the spacious garden has a stone fence and mature planting.

A very interesting and well maintained house which has successfully combined several architectural styles. Extremely fine joinery and plaster work. Pleasing proportion of exterior and interior, set in ample and spacious grounds, St Cloud remains a notable landmark in Burwood.

A large two-storey house of brick and stucco with tiled roof, three storey square tower topped by copper clad dome, all in high Victorian manner. Nine main rooms, three downstairs, six above, kitchen and servants quarters attached, billiards room added 1910. Two storey verandah with ornate lace balustrade to north facade and north of tower. Richly carved entry door surrounded by fine stained glass. Fine pedimented cedar doorways internally, boldly carved ceiling plasterwork, carved cedar staircase, fine stained glass. House thought to be built 1892–93.

=== Modifications and dates ===
- 1910 a billiards room was added.
- Later it became the administrative block for St. Joseph's Convent.
- 1978 it returned to being a private residence.

== Heritage listing ==
St Cloud was listed on the New South Wales State Heritage Register on 2 April 1999.

== See also ==
- Australian residential architectural styles
