= Municipality of Burwood =

- Local government area
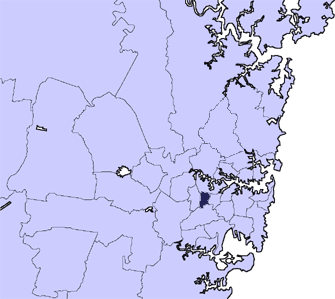
- Location in Metropolitan Sydney

- Interactive map of Municipality of Burwood
- Coordinates: 33°53′S 151°06′E
- Country: Australia
- State: New South Wales
- Region: Metropolitan Sydney
- Established: 27 March 1874
- Council seat: Burwood

Government
  - Mayor: John Faker
  - State electorate: Strathfield
  - Federal divisions: Reid; Grayndler

Area
  - Total: 7 km^{2} (2.7 sq mi)

Population
  - Total: 40,217 (2021 census)
  - Density: 5,700/km^{2} (14,900/sq mi)
- Website: Municipality of Burwood
LGAs around Municipality of Burwood
| Canada Bay | Canada Bay | Inner West |
| Strathfield | Municipality of Burwood | Inner West |
| Canterbury Bankstown | Canterbury Bankstown | Inner West |

The Municipality of Burwood (also known as Burwood Council) is a local government area in the inner-west of Sydney, in the state of New South Wales, Australia. The mayor of the Municipality is John Faker, a member of the Labor Party. The municipality is 7 km^{2}, making it the second smallest local government area in New South Wales, being larger than only Hunter's Hill.

== History ==
The municipality was established on 27 March 1874. The council chambers are located on Conder Street and were designed and built by architect Jack Hennessy in 1877. Hennessy was later a mayor of Burwood.

A 2015 review of local government boundaries by the NSW Government Independent Pricing and Regulatory Tribunal recommended that the Municipality of Burwood merge with adjoining councils of: Canada Bay and Strathfield Councils to form a new council with an area of 41 square kilometres (16 sq mi) and support a population of approximately 163,000 at the time.

In May 2016, Strathfield Council challenged the proposed merger and commenced proceedings in the New South Wales Land and Environment Court. After the court heard that there were legal flaws in the report from the state government-appointed delegate who examined the proposal for merging the councils, the NSW Government withdrew from the case and the merger proposal stalled. In July 2017, the Berejiklian government decided to abandon the forced merger of the Strathfield, Burwood and Canada Bay local government areas, along with several other proposed forced mergers.

== Suburbs in the local government area ==
The following suburbs within the Municipality of Burwood are:

- Burwood
- Burwood Heights
- Enfield
- Croydon (shared with Inner West)
- Croydon Park (shared with Canterbury-Bankstown and Inner West)
- Strathfield (shared with the Canada Bay and Strathfield)

== Demographics ==
At the 2021 census, there were 40,217 people in the Burwood local government area, of these, 48.9 per cent were male and 51.1 per cent were female. Aboriginal and Torres Strait Islander people made up 0.4 per cent of the population; significantly below the NSW and Australian averages of 2.9 and 2.8 per cent respectively. The median age of people in the Municipality of Burwood was 34 years. Children aged 0–14 years made up 4.2 per cent of the population and people aged 85 years and over made up 2.9 per cent of the population. The largest age group was 20–24 (12.4 per cent). Of people in the area aged 15 years and over, 43.7 per cent were married and 9.4 per cent were either divorced or separated.

Population growth in the Municipality of Burwood between the 2001 census and the 2006 census was 5.26 per cent; and in the subsequent five years to the 2011 census, population growth was 4.84 per cent. At the 2016 census, the population in the Municipality increased by 13.53 per cent. When compared with total population growth of Australia for the same period, being 8.8 per cent, population growth in Burwood local government area was significantly higher than the national average. The median weekly income for residents within the Municipality of Burwood of was generally on par with the national average.

At the 2021 census, the proportion of residents in Burwood local government area who stated their ancestry as Chinese was 6 times the national average; and the proportion of households where an Asian language was spoken at home was only slightly higher than the national average (1.4 times).

Selected historical census data for Burwood local government area
| Census year | | 2001 | 2006 | 2011 | 2016 | 2021 |
|---|---|---|---|---|---|---|
| Population | Estimated residents on census night | 29,381 | ▲30,926 | ▲32,423 | ▲36,809 | ▲40,217 |
| Population | LGA rank in terms of size within New South Wales | | | 57th | ▲55th | 55th |
| Population | % of New South Wales population | | | 0.46% | ▲0.49% | ▲0.50% |
| Population | % of Australian population | 0.16% | 0.16% | ▼0.15% | ▲0.16% | 0.16% |
| Median weekly incomes | | | | | | |
| Personal income | Median weekly personal income | | A$403 | A$490 | A$552 | A$739 |
| Personal income | % of Australian median income | | 86.5% | ▼84.9% | ▼83.4% | ▲91.8% |
| Family income | Median weekly family income | | A$1,194 | A$1,441 | A$1,725 | A$2,101 |
| Family income | % of Australian median income | | 102.0% | ▼97.3% | ▲99.5% | ▼99.1% |
| Household income | Median weekly household income | | A$1,017 | A$1,310 | A$1,569 | A$1,867 |
| Household income | % of Australian median income | | 104.3% | ▲106.2% | ▲109.1% | ▼106.9% |
| Dwelling structure | | | | | | |
| Dwelling type | Flat or apartment | 34.5% | ▲35.3% | ▲35.6% | ▲42.9% | ▲49.1% |
| Dwelling type | Semi-detached, terrace or townhouse | 9.9% | ▼9.7% | ▲11.2% | ▲16.5% | ▼15.2% |
| Dwelling type | Separate house | 53.7% | ▲54.4% | ▼52.5% | ▼39.4% | ▼34.5% |

Selected historical census data for Burwood local government area
Ancestry, top responses
| 2001 | | 2006 | | 2011 | | 2016 | | 2021 | |
|---|---|---|---|---|---|---|---|---|---|
| No Data | | No Data | | Chinese | 21.8% | Chinese | ▲28.1% | Chinese | ▲32.8% |
| No Data | | No Data | | Australian | 10.4% | English | ▼9.2% | English | ▲10.7% |
| No Data | | No Data | | English | 9.9% | Australian | ▼8.8% | Australian | ▲9.6% |
| No Data | | No Data | | Italian | 8.0% | Italian | ▼6.8% | Nepalese | ▲7.4% |
| No Data | | No Data | | Irish | 4.6% | Irish | ▼4.4% | Italian | ▲7.3% |
Country of birth, top responses
| 2001 | | 2006 | | 2011 | | 2016 | | 2021 | |
| Australia | 46.0% | Australia | ▼42.3% | Australia | ▼41.7% | Australia | ▼37.4% | Australia | ▼37.0% |
| China | 7.8% | China | ▲11.9% | China | ▲14.9% | China | ▲20.6% | China | ▼18.1% |
| South Korea | 5.0% | India | ▲4.6% | India | ▲4.7% | India | ▼4.3% | Nepal | ▲7.6% |
| Italy | 4.6% | South Korea | ▼4.2% | South Korea | ▼3.8% | Nepal | ▲3.5% | India | ▼3.1% |
| Lebanon | 2.5% | Italy | ▼4.0% | Italy | ▼3.5% | South Korea | ▼3.4% | Vietnam | ▲2.7% |
| India | 2.3% | Lebanon | ▼2.2% | Nepal | ▲2.9% | Italy | ▼2.8% | South Korea | ▼2.4% |
Language, top responses (other than English)
| 2001 | | 2006 | | 2011 | | 2016 | | 2021 | |
| Cantonese | 7.8% | Mandarin | ▲10.1% | Mandarin | ▲12.7% | Mandarin | ▲20.3% | Mandarin | ▼19.9% |
| Italian | 7.3% | Cantonese | ▲8.5% | Cantonese | ▲8.8% | Cantonese | ▼8.6% | Cantonese | ▼8.2% |
| Mandarin | 5.8% | Italian | ▼6.5% | Italian | ▼5.7% | Italian | ▼4.4% | Nepali | ▲7.3% |
| Arabic | 5.7% | Arabic | ▼4.9% | Korean | ▼4.5% | Korean | ▼3.9% | Arabic | ▼3.5% |
| Korean | 5.4% | Korean | ▼4.7% | Arabic | ▼4.4% | Arabic | ▼3.7% | Italian | ▼3.3% |
Religious affiliation, top responses
| 2001 | | 2006 | | 2011 | | 2016 | | 2021 | |
| Catholic | 36.9% | Catholic | ▼33.4% | Catholic | ▼30.2% | No Religion | ▲32.7% | No Religion | ▲34.6% |
| No Religion | 12.6% | No Religion | ▲16.6% | No Religion | ▲21.5% | Catholic | ▼24.6% | Catholic | ▼22.0% |
| Anglican | 9.5% | Anglican | ▼7.4% | Buddhism | ▲7.3% | Not Stated | 8.2% | Hinduism | ▲10.0% |
| Orthodox | 7.0% | Buddhism | ▲6.3% | Hinduism | ▲7.2% | Hinduism | ▲7.5% | Buddhism | ▲7.8% |
| Buddhism | 5.8% | Eastern Orthodox | ▼6.1% | Anglican | ▼6.5% | Buddhism | ▼6.8% | Not Stated | 6.8% |

== Council ==
Burwood Municipal Council

Type
- Type: Unicameral

Leadership
- Mayor: John Faker, Labor since 2011
- Deputy Mayor: George Mannah, Labor since 2022

Structure
- Seats: 7 (6 councillors & 1 mayor)
- Political groups: Labor (5); Liberal (2)

Elections
- Voting system: Proportional preferential voting (councillors); Optional preferential voting (mayor)
- First election: 1897 (council); 2012 (mayor)
- Last election: 2024

Meeting place
- Burwood Council Chambers; 2 Conder St, Burwood, New South Wales

=== Current composition and election method ===
Burwood Council comprises seven councillors, including the mayor, for a fixed four-year term of office. Since 2012, the mayor has been directly elected, while the six other councillors are elected proportionally as one ward. The most recent election was held on 14 September 2024, and the makeup of the council, including the mayor, was as follows:

| Party | Councillors |
|---|---|
| Australian Labor Party | 5 |
| Liberal Party of Australia | 2 |
| Total | 7 |

The current council, elected in 2024, in order of election, is:

| Mayor | Party | Notes |
|---|---|---|
| John Faker | Labor | Councillor 2000–2012; mayor 2001–2002, 2005–2008, 2011–date. |
| Councillor | Party | Notes |
| Deyi Wu | Liberal | Elected 2024 |
| George Mannah | Labor | Elected 2012; deputy mayor 2016–2017, 2022–date. |
| Pascale Esber | Labor | Elected 2021 |
| David Hull | Liberal | Elected 2021 |
| Alex Yang | Labor | Elected 2024 |
| Sukirti Bhatta | Labor | Elected 2024 |

== Election results ==
=== 2024 ===
2024 New South Wales local elections: Burwood
| Party | Candidate | Votes | % | ±% |
|---|---|---|---|---|
| Labor | 1. John Faker; 2. George Mannah (elected 1); 3. Pascale Esber (elected 3); 4. Alex Yang (elected 5); 5. Sukirti Bhatta (elected 6); 6. Chris Gray; 7. Victoria Holland | 10,387 | 61.7 | +9.5 |
| Liberal | 1. Deyi Wu (elected 2); 2. David Hull (elected 4); 3. Raj Dixit | 5,122 | 30.4 | +6.9 |
| Unity | 1. Guitang Lu; 2. Yi Shen; 3. Hua Yang; 4. Qun Ping Guo | 1,317 | 7.8 | +7.8 |
| Total formal votes | | 16,826 | 93.4 | −1.0 |
| Informal votes | | 1,129 | 6.6 | +1.0 |
| Turnout | | 18,018 | 84.9 | −2.1 |

=== 2021 ===
| Elected councillor | Party |
|---|---|
| Heather Crichton | Labor |
| George Mannah | Labor |
| Pascale Esber | Labor |
| David Hull | Liberal |
| Hugo Robinson | Liberal |
| Ned Cutcher | Greens |

2021 New South Wales local elections: Burwood
| Party | Candidate | Votes | % | ±% |
|---|---|---|---|---|
| | Labor | 9,002 | 52.2 | +1.1 |
| | Liberal | 4,050 | 23.5 | −2.4 |
| | Greens | 2,196 | 12.7 | +12.7 |
| | Independent | 1,277 | 7.4 | +7.4 |
| | Major Independent Group | 725 | 4.2 | +4.2 |
| Total formal votes | | 17,250 | 94.4 | |
| Informal votes | | 1,030 | 5.6 | |
| Turnout | | 18,280 | 87.0 | |
| Party total seats | | | Seats | ± |
| | Labor | | 3 | Steady |
| | Liberal | | 2 | Steady |
| | Greens | | 1 | ▲1 |

=== 2017 ===
| Elected councillor | Party |
|---|---|
| Heather Crichton | Labor |
| Joseph Del Duca | Liberal |
| Lesley Furneaux-Cook | ICV |
| George Mannah | Labor |
| Ernest Chan | Labor |
| Raj Dixit | Liberal |

2017 New South Wales local elections: Burwood
| Party | Candidate | Votes | % | ±% |
|---|---|---|---|---|
| | Labor | 7,912 | 51.1 | +7.2 |
| | Liberal | 4,002 | 25.8 | −1.8 |
| | Independent Community Voice | 3,575 | 23.1 | +0.0 |
| Total formal votes | | 15,489 | 93.66 | |
| Informal votes | | 1,048 | 6.34 | |
| Turnout | | 16,537 | 79.97 | |

== State and federal government ==
In the NSW Legislative Assembly, the Municipality of Burwood falls into the electorate of Strathfield.

For Federal elections it is in the electorates of Reid (north of Hume Highway) and Watson (south of Hume Highway).

== Heritage listings ==
The Municipality of Burwood has a number of heritage-listed sites, including the following sites listed on the New South Wales State Heritage Register:

- Burwood, 168a Burwood Road: Burwood Post Office
- Burwood, 205 Burwood Road: St Paul's Anglican Church, Burwood
- Burwood, 213 Burwood Road: The Priory, Burwood
- Burwood, 223 Burwood Road: St. Cloud, Burwood
- Burwood, 4 Clarence Street: Lynton, Burwood
- Burwood, Great Southern and Western railway: Burwood rail underbridge
- Burwood, Great Southern and Western railway: Burwood railway station, Sydney
- Burwood, Railway Parade: Burwood Sewer Vent
- Croydon, Boundary Street: Shubra Hall
- Croydon, Paisley Road: Croydon Sewer Vent
- Strathfield, 62 The Boulevarde: Trinity Uniting Church, Strathfield

== Council logo ==
Burwood Council introduced in September 2019 a new logo designed to reflect the changes which have made it a vibrant and multicultural destination while retaining its heritage. The new logo design, based on the letter 'B', is divided into six parts for the suburbs of the area: Burwood, Burwood Heights, Croydon, Croydon Park, Enfield and Strathfield. Residents' priorities are represented by the colour scheme: harmony and friendship (pink), trust and stability (light blue), creativity and vibrancy (orange), heritage and heart (red), the natural environment (green) and energy and optimism (yellow). Traditional typeface has been used in keeping with the commitment to heritage.

The previous 'Municipality of Burwood' logo was designed in 1936.

== See also ==
- List of local government areas in New South Wales
- Local government areas of New South Wales
