= Keith Jones (surgeon) =

Australian surgeon (1911-2012)

Sir Keith Jones FRCS FRACS FRAGP HonFACEM

President of the Australian Medical Association
- In office 1973–1976
- Preceded by: Gavin Johnson
- Succeeded by: Rupert Margarey

Personal details
- Born: July 7, 1911 Narrandera, New South Wales
- Died: March 2, 2012 (aged 100) Collaroy, New South Wales
- Education: MB BS (Hons)
- Alma mater: The University of Sydney, Newington College
- Occupation: General Practitioner, Surgeon
- Known for: Doctor, Surgeon, Medical Executive
- Awards: Knight Bachelor

Sir Keith Stephen Jones (7 July 1911 – 2 March 2012) was an Australian general practitioner, surgeon and medical executive, who served as the 6th President of the Australian Medical Association, from 1973–1976, during the introduction of universal health care in Australia.

Jones graduated as a medical doctor from the University of Sydney in 1933. He served in World War II with the 5th Field Ambulance in Papua New Guinea. He was awarded a fellowship with the Royal College of Surgeons in 1955. For his service to the medical profession, he was knighted in 1979.

== Early life ==
Jones was born on 7 July 1911 in Narrandera in the New South Wales Riverina, to Stephen and Muriel Jones, the eldest of four. Stephen William Jones was an engineer born in 1885. They had moved to Narrandera due to Stephen Jones' work on the Murrumbidgee Irrigation Area, in his role at the NSW Public Works Department. Muriel Elsy Mary Rickard was a music teacher, born in Cowra.

In 1912, after Stephen Jones was relocated to Newcastle, where Keith's two younger siblings, Gordon and Cecily were born. They lived in the suburb of Mayfield until Stephen was transferred to Sydney. The family moved to Manly in late 1919, when Keith's third sibling, Elizabeth, was born.

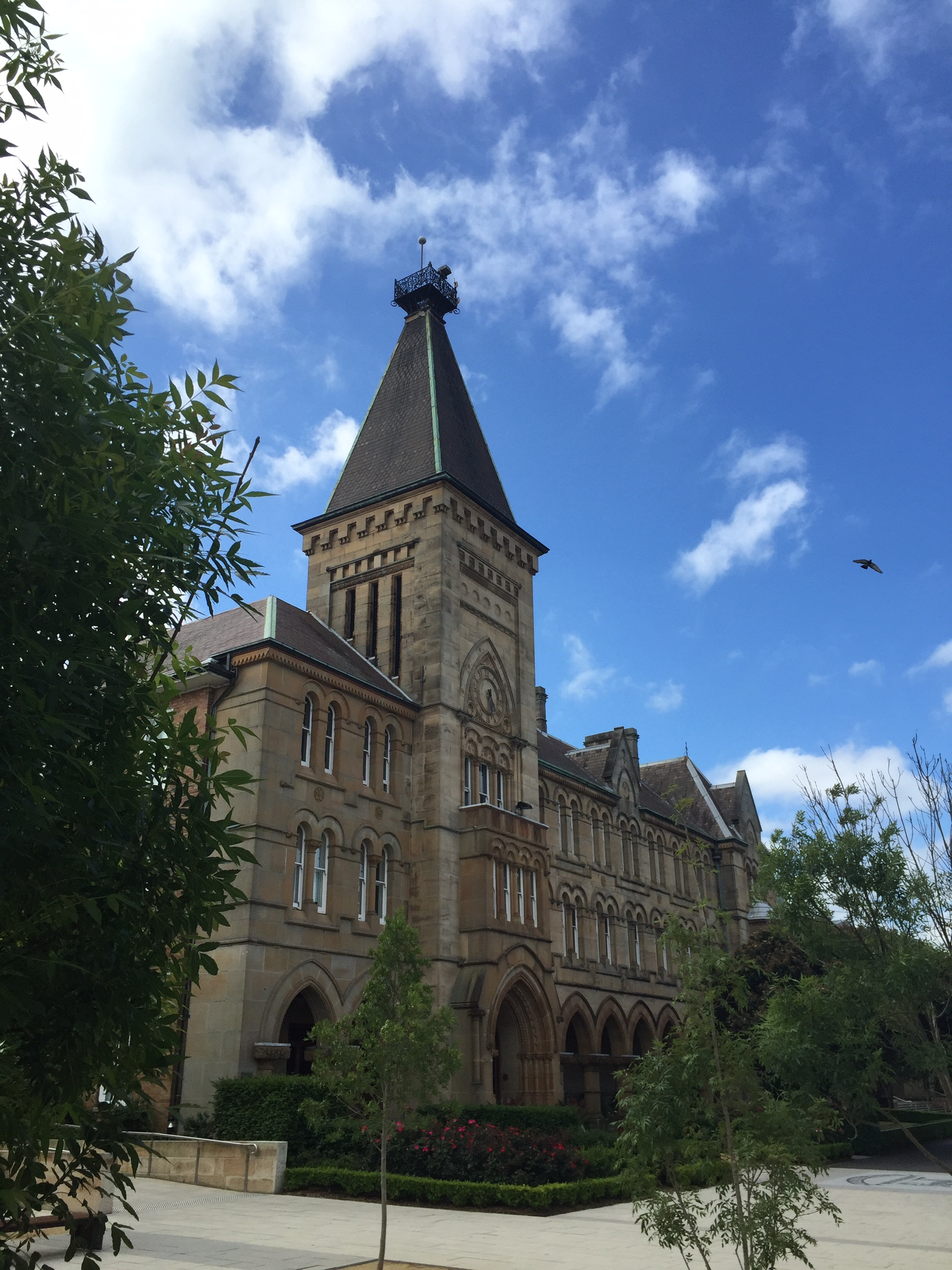
Newington College, Stanmore

After starting school in Mayfield Public School and Hamilton Public School while in Newcastle, Jones studied at Manly Public School and Croydon Public School. While studying at Ashfield Preparatory School, Jones earned a scholarship to Newington College in Stanmore, which he attended from 1924, where he showed talent in sport. In his early years, he played rugby union, cricket and athletics and he won annual awards for his academic merits. As a senior student he was a prefect, Dux of the College, champion of the 880 yards and hurdles races and was captain of the 1st XV Rugby team. During this time, he broke records, including the New South Wales junior 880 yards record in 1929. He also won awards for mathematics and chemistry.

While living at Wesley College during University studies he partook in sport at the Sydney University Athletics Club. He ran in the Australian Championships in 1932, during which he was a part of the mile medley team which set a record which would not be beaten until 1942. He set Australian team records in the 4 x 400 and 4 x 880 yards relays and in the one mile medley relay. Though a candidate for competition in the upcoming 1934 British Empire Games and 1936 Olympics, he was unable to balance his medical studies and his sport and was forced to retire after his success in 1932.

== Army service ==
While Jones studied at Newington College, he enrolled in the cadets corps and, when he was eighteen, he joined the Sydney University Regiment. After graduation, Jones joined the Australian Army Medical Corps. He was placed in the Reserves until the start of World War II, when he joined the 5th Field Ambulance, which was based in Greta Camp, which at the time, had no motor vehicle ambulances. The unit was stationed in regional New South Wales, and later Queensland, before moving to Papua New Guinea. He was a major, and his role was predominantly administrative. His brother, Gordon Jones, had also studied medicine and was serving in the Medical Corps when he was killed on the AHS Centaur. Keith Jones had declined a position on the ship during the period in which it sunk. In 2009, the wreckage was found near Queensland.

In 1944, Keith Jones was relieved from his position on compassionate grounds, after his wife Kath suffered severe burns. By the end of his service he had served in the 2nd Australian Army Corps and the 6th, 7th and 9th Divisions in Papua New Guinea.

== Medical career ==
=== Training ===
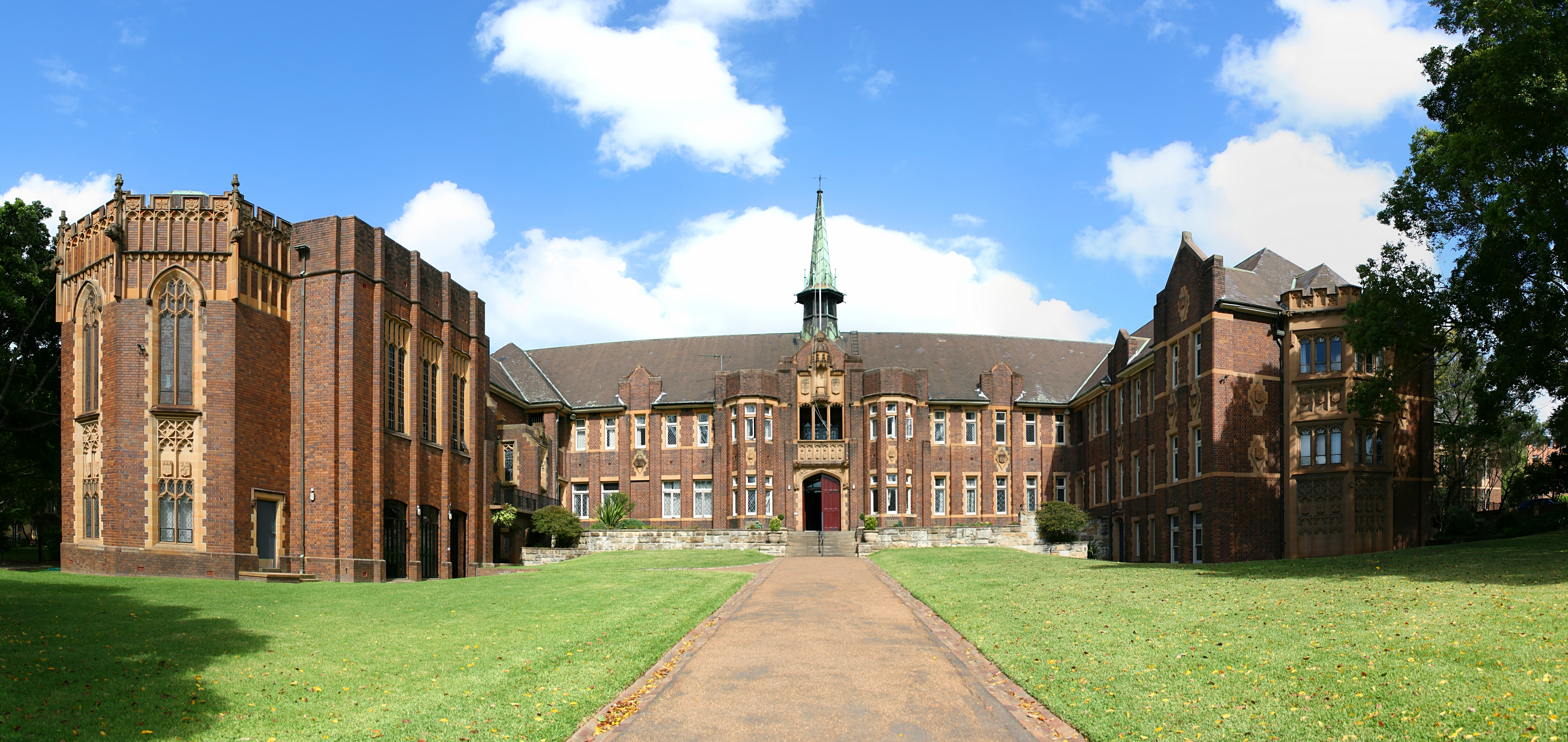
Wesley College, The University of Sydney

Jones studied at the University of Sydney and lived at Wesley College from 1928, which were supported in part by scholarships from Wesley and Newington Colleges. In 1928, Jones entered the Faculty of Medicine. An excerpt from the 1933 University of Sydney Yearbook reads "as well as being a first-class athlete, Keith is an excellent scholar. His academic career has been quite unruffled and he has gained honours each year …"

He conducted an internship at Royal Prince Alfred Hospital, and began working at the Western Suburbs Hospital during his fourth year. Though still a student, Jones was taken on as a resident medical officer given a shortage of junior doctors caused by the Great Depression.

=== Practice ===
Thanks to financial assistance from his father, Jones entered general practice in the small, south coast town of Pambula, where he stayed for ten years.

After serving in World War II both in Northern Australia and in Papua New Guinea, Jones re-entered general practice in Pambula, but sought further qualification to enter surgery.

New qualification systems for the Royal Australasian College of Surgeons meant that because of Jones’ training, which was not in keeping with regulation, he was not eligible to attain a fellowship. Instead he had to travel to Edinburgh to train and sit the exam for the Royal College of Surgeons instead. He gained his fellowship in 1949 and began practicing as a general surgeon. In 1953 he obtained a role as an Honorary Surgeon to the Manly Hospital, and later the Director of the Accident Emergency Unit. In 1955, he began practicing out of rooms on Macquarie Street.

=== Presidency of the Australian Medical Association ===
After Jones graduated as a Fellow of The Royal College of Surgeons in 1949, Jones was qualified in specialist medicine. He traveled to the United States in the late 1960s, where he was involved in meetings of the American Medical Association. Upon his return, colleagues, led by Archie Collins, commended him for leadership positions in the New South Wales branch of the Australian Medical Association. While a Senior Resident Medical Officer at Western Suburbs Hospital, Jones uncle, AM McIntosh, who was an honorary surgeon at the hospital, had encouraged Jones to join the British Medical Association. Jones' engagement was limited until 1952 Collins, a doctor at the Royal Prince Alfred Hospital, invited Jones to run for the New South Wales Branch of the British Medical Association. In 1962, the British Medical Association now the Australian Medical Association, he became the President of the branch. After his term as President ended in 1963, he served as Treasurer and as New South Wales Branch Council Representative to the Federal Council. He served as State Association Treasurer for seven years.

John Gorton’s government passed a bill in 1969 which established the public health insurance service. Jones was the treasurer of the New South Wales Australian Medical Association and was held responsible when, on the 1st of July 1970, a list of fees and benefits was announced by the Federal Government. These were displeasing to the Australian Medical Association populous. Over one-thousand attendees at a meeting of the New South Wales Australian Medical Association offered a vote of no confidence in Jones and voted to bar him the chance to speak on the matter. Both Jones and the other New South Wales Australian Medical Association Federal Councillor, Dr Munro Alexander, left the meeting and tendered their resignations. The Executive refused to accept the resignations however, at the next general meeting Alexander lost his position, and Jones was only returned narrowly.

After this experience, Jones was re-elected as a Committee member for the next term and chosen to serve on the Federal Australian Medical Association council. In 1972 he served as the Vice President and one year later, he was elected president. However, the then Labor Government's continual efforts to state owned health care in the form of Medibank proved controversial, particularly with the Trade Unions. The Australian Medical Association opposed the publication of the health service, as it now restricted general practitioners' capacity to set their own fees. Backlash from the Unions was so significant that Jones received death threats due to his role, and the Medical Association was required to employ security for his safety. Despite this, he became popular as President, with one commentator noting at the time that Jones was ''one of the more stylish of Australia's medical leaders."

He served as President of the Australian Medical Association until 1976. At the annual meeting of the association on 2 June 1976, Jones' final meeting as president, he was awarded the Gold Medal of the Australian Medical Association.

=== After Presidency ===
After Jones left the executive of the Australian Medical Association after his Presidency ended in 1976, he was appointed to oversee the development of Manly Hospital's Medical and Emergency Centre. He was the Director of the centre for the next seven years. During this time, because his role at Manly Hospital was not overly strenuous after the development to the Emergency Centre was complete, Jones took on another role as Chief Executive Officer for the Manly-Warringah Health Area. This role often entailed legal oversight in Committees of Inquiry, which were powers established in the New South Wales Hospitals Act. Further, the Minister for Health appointed Jones to further roles at this time, as a mediator sent to the Lake Macquarie power plant, whose union was demanding upgrades made to Wyong Hospital. He served a similar role at a regional hospital which was to be closed in Carcoar and at a board dispute at Nepean District Hospital. By this time, Jones was an expert in public and social health, which encouraged his invitation to an symposium on "International Perspectives on American Health Policy Choices", in 1980. In March 1980, he was formally invested as a Knight Bachelor by then Governor-General Sir Zelman Cowen.

In 1981, after turning seventy, Jones retired from his position at Manly Hospital and entered the medico-legal field.

== Personal and later life ==
Jones met Kath Abbott in 1930 at a charity dance at Croydon Masonic Hall. They became engaged in 1932 and were married on 30 January 1936. Abbott was an artist, who attended the Julian Ashton Art School and whose works were later showcased at the Macquarie Galleries in Sydney. Abbott's father was Arthur Abbott (1876–1960), a president of The Incorporated Law Institute of New South Wales. Her grandfather was Joseph Abbott (1843–1903), wool–broker and New South Wales state politician. Together, they had three children, Stephen in 1937, Richard in 1941 and Robert in 1945.

In 1944, Kath Jones was badly burned and Jones was discharged from his military duties and returned home. Though she was not initially expected to survive her injuries, she made a full recovery after treatment at Manly Hospital, where Jones would later be employed. The Joneses moved from Pembula to Manly in 1945 so that the children could go to school in Sydney. Jones entered general practice locally. In January 1984, the Joneses moved to Bayview. The family lived on Sydney's Northern Beaches for the rest of their lives.

In retirement, Jones took mathematics classes at the University of Sydney and spent more time on the board of the Manly Regional Art Gallery and Museum, where Kath Jones' work had been showcased. He later served as President of the Board from 1979 until 1984. The Jonses enjoyed attending musical concerts, ballet, and the opera.

Jones died on 2 March 2012, aged 100, at Peter Cosgrove House, RSL Village, Collaroy, New South Wales. He was survived by his three sons. Lady Jones predeceased him in 2002, aged 90. At the end of her life she lived at Bayview Gardens Nursing home, and suffered dementia.

== Committees ==
- College Councillor, Newington College (1951–1970)
- President, Old Newingtonians' Union (1962–1963)
- Member, New South Wales Medical Board (1971–1981)
- President, Australian Medical Association (1973–1976)
- Member, Australian Drug Evaluation Committee (1972–1993)
- Member, Postgraduate Committee in Medicine of the University of Sydney
- Chairman, State Civil Defense Medical Advisory Committee
- Chairman, National Health Service Committees (1979–1982)
- Chief Medical Officer, Medical and Health Services, New South Wales State Emergency Service
- Member, Medical War Planning Committee
- Chairman, Manly Regional Art Gallery and Museum (1979–1984)
- Chairman, Australasian Medical Publishing Company (1976–1982)
- Vice-President, New South Wales Council of Professions
- Chairman, Medical Benefits Fund of Australia
- Editor, Medical Journal of Australia

== Fellowships and Honours ==
- Fellow, Royal College of Surgeons (Edinburgh)
- Fellow, Royal Australasian College of Surgeons
- Knight Bachelor, Australian Honours List (1979)
- Gold Medal, Australian Medical Association (1976)
- Honorary Fellow, Australasian College for Emergency Medicine
- Honorary Fellow, Royal Australian College of General Practitioners

== Publications ==
- Jones, K. (2004). One Man’s Story. Willoughby, Phillip Matthews.
- Jones, K. S. (1978). "Triage." Australian Family Physician 7(1): 15–17.
