= Croydon railway station, Sydney =

Railway station in Sydney, New South Wales, Australia

Croydon
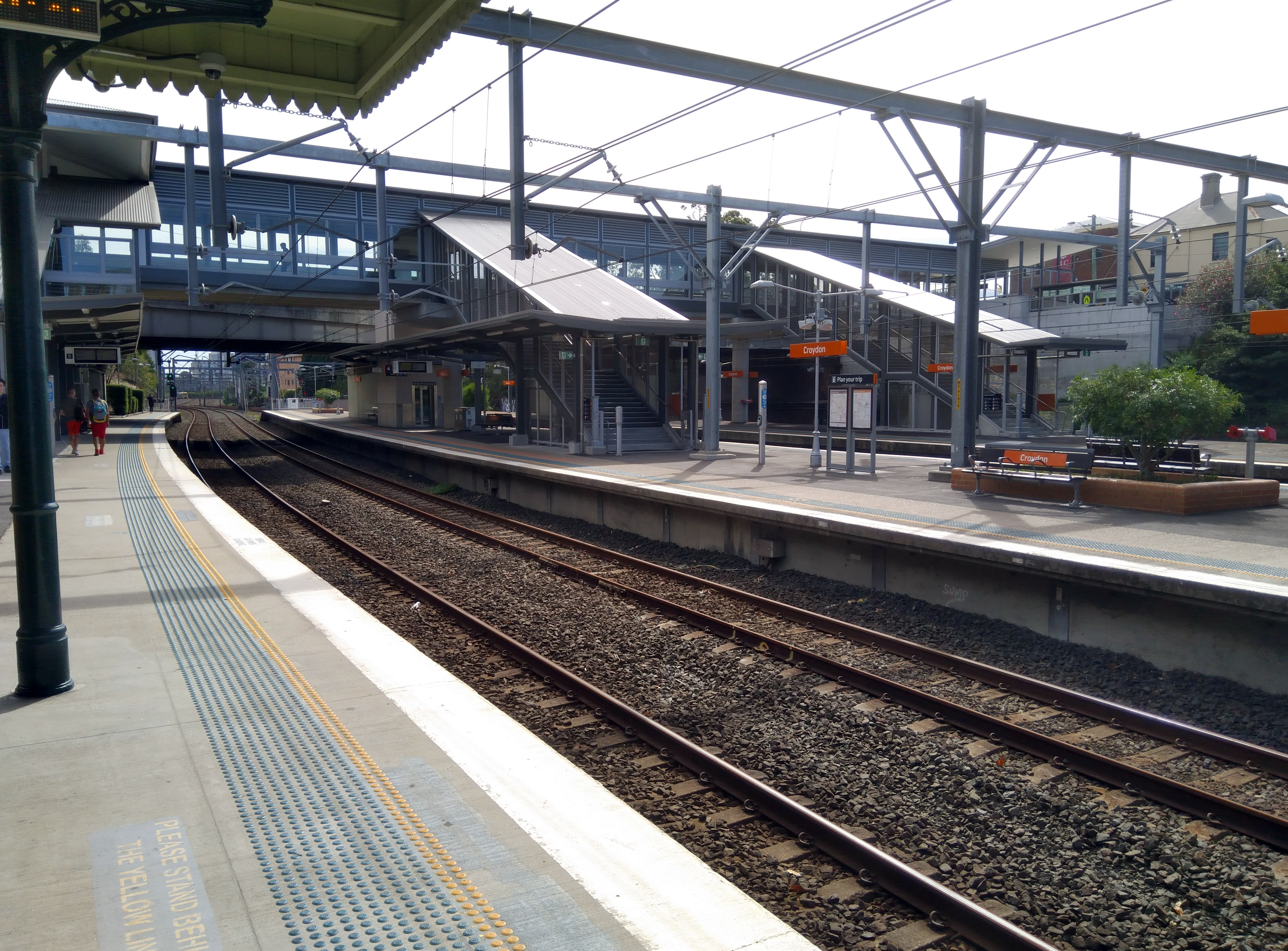
- Westbound view from Platform 5, showing the station's pedestrian footbridge and concourse in April 2018

General information
- Location: Meta Street, Croydon; Sydney, New South Wales; Australia
- Coordinates: 33°53′00″S 151°06′56″E
- Owner: Transport Asset Manager of NSW
- Operator: Sydney Trains
- Line: Main Suburban
- Distance: 9.42 km (5.85 mi) from Central
- Platforms: 5 (1 side, 2 island)
- Tracks: 6

Construction
- Structure type: Ground
- Accessible: Yes

Other information
- Status: Weekdays: Staffed: 6am to 7pm: Weekends and public holidays: Staffed: 8am to 4pm
- Station code: CYD
- Website: Transport for NSW

History
- Opened: 7 January 1875 (151 years ago)
- Electrified: Yes (from 1928)
- Former names: Five Dock (1875–1876)

Passengers
- 2025: 1,160,162 (year); 3,179 (daily) (Sydney Trains)
- Rank: 117

Services
Preceding station	Sydney Trains	Following station
Burwood towards Parramatta or Leppington	Leppington & Inner West Line	Ashfield towards City Circle
Burwood towards Liverpool	Liverpool & Inner West Line	Ashfield towards City Circle
North Shore & Western Line does not stop here
Northern Line does not stop here
Location

Croydon railway station is a heritage-listed suburban railway station located on the Main Suburban line, serving the Sydney suburb of Croydon. It is served by Sydney Trains T2 Leppington & Inner West Line and occasional T3 Liverpool & Inner West Line services. The station was designed by NSW Government Railways and built from 1892 to 1927. It was added to the New South Wales State Heritage Register on 2 April 1999.

== History ==
The Main Western line to Parramatta (Granville) was originally completed in 1855. The line opened on 26 September 1855 and was double track from Sydney to Newtown and then single track to Parramatta (but duplicated in 1856). The line was built as a direct connection to Parramatta and, subsequently, for the purpose of connecting Sydney with the major rural railways that were constructed across the Blue Mountains to Bathurst and across the Southern Highlands to Goulburn via Liverpool. There were few stops along the line between Sydney and Parramatta and it was not the original intention of the line to serve suburban development. Changes to the line were more often related to the line's long distance purpose than to the communities along it.

Traffic to the west and south (and later north) of the state brought the need to amplify the line, first in 1891 when it was quadrupled and later in 1927 when it was sextupled (to Homebush) and electrified. With both of these major changes the earlier stations were usually entirely demolished and replaced with a new station. The 1927 work completed this process with the complete replacement of Strathfield and much of Newtown Stations. During this time suburban development also extended west along the line and these new stations were thus specifically designed as full-scale suburban passenger stations rather than rural "halts". The Engineer for Existing Lines, George Cowdery (appointed 1863), was a particularly strong influence on the architecture of this line, building particularly elegant stations in the late 1880s ahead of the 1891 quadruplication, in addition to replacing the original stone arch viaduct at Lewisham with iron truss bridges. Sextuplication in 1927 brought less change to most local stations (which were on the southern side), the new tracks being express ones on the northern side.

Croydon Station was opened as Five Dock on 7 January 1875 and renamed Croydon in August 1876. In 1880 a new waiting shed and ticket office were erected, the platforms were lengthened and a cottage erected for the Porter-in-Charge. In 1883 a vertically curved footbridge was erected at the Sydney end of Platforms, near Edwin Street.

In 1890 a mortuary shed was provided at the Sydney end and the south side, together with a post office. The main station building was on the Up or northern platform against a cutting, the remains of this building can still be seen today. The waiting shed on the Down platform was 24m west of Edwin Street and had a post office immediately behind this shed. A footbridge was built at the western end of the platforms and connected to Meta Street by a ramp and to the land on the southern side by steps.

The present station buildings and layout are associated with the quadruplication of 1892 for which an island platform with two side platforms were built to serve both "fast" and "slow" pairs of tracks. In 1892 the two additional tracks for the quadruplication were laid on the south side of the station, the contract being awarded to John Ahern for the building of the western footbridge and the new Meta Street overbridge. The Edwin Street level crossing was closed and the post office relocated on the eastern side of the new island platform. A pedestrian subway was built at the eastern end of the station in 1892 when the adjacent level crossing was closed. This subway was closed after 1980.

The line was sextuplicated through Croydon in 1926–7, followed by electrification works: the local and suburban lines in 1928 and the main lines in 1955. Two additional lines were built on the southern side and the old Up "fast" platform was demolished and the post office relocated outside railway land. (Remnants remained of the footbridge and stairs leading up to this platform until they were demolished as part of the station upgrade in 2017.) In 1926, the waiting room for Platform 3/4 was shifted to Platform 5 and a new building built on Platform 3/4. An overhead booking office was also constructed in 1928. In the 1930s a new building was erected on Platforms 2/3. In 1933, the station building along the Hennessy Street platform was removed. The waiting room on Platform 1/2 was constructed in 1941. In 1947-48 an overhead parcels office was constructed and a bookstall incorporated within the booking hall.

The parcels office was removed from the overhead booking office in 1980. The station underwent upgrade works in 1994-95 including the removal of a section of footbridge, the shifting of the booking office to its current location, and new platform canopies.

In 2015, work commenced to on build a new footbridge and lifts.

== Services ==
=== Platforms ===
Platform	Line	Stopping pattern	Notes
1		no regular services	
2		no regular services	
3		no regular services	
4	T2	services to Central & the City Circle	
4	T3	services to Central & the City Circle (weekday early morning, late night and weekends only)	
5	T2	services to Homebush, Leppington & Parramatta	
5	T3	services to Liverpool via Regents Park (weekday early morning, late night and weekends only)	

=== Transport links ===
Croydon station is served by three NightRide routes:

- N50: Liverpool station to Town Hall station
- N60: Fairfield station to Town Hall station
- N61: Carlingford station to Town Hall station

== Description ==
The entrance to Croydon Railway Station is from the Strand or Meta Road, Croydon. This is the only entrance to the station. It has two island and one wayside platforms, all of which have station buildings, as well as an Overhead Booking Office and a footbridge. There is commercial activity along The Strand and Hennessey Street, and residential development along Paisley Road and Meta Street.

Croydon Railway Station has a moderate degree of integrity as its platform buildings are in a relatively intact condition. However the relocation of the waiting room to Platform 1 and 2 and the booking office from the footbridge to the street level has affected the intactness of the station layout.

=== Platform Building: Platform 1/2 (1941) ===
The building is a second island platform building and its architectural style can be described as Railway Stripped Functionalist. It is a single room, rectangular building with stretcher bond brickwork, chamfered corners and a flat roof with cantilevered awnings. The window openings are original with concrete sills, steel frames and three paned fixed glass sashes. Two original entrances into the waiting room which are positioned directly opposite each other consist of exposed brick frames and steel grill gates which are permanently locked.

Original internal features include the asbestos sheet ceiling, the four steel I beam columns at the corners of the room and the timber bench seats. The ceiling and walls are rendered and painted.

The building is generally in a good condition. The waiting room is in a good condition and does not need any immediate maintenance. The waiting room is highly intact especially internally.

=== Platform Building: Platform 3/4 (1926) ===
This is an initial island platform standard building and is a rectangular structure six bays long with Flemish bond brickwork. The bays are defined by engaged brick piers that have concrete corbels and standard double bowed steel brackets that support awnings with curtain board fascia. The awnings are integrated with the gable roof of the building and the roofing material for both the awning and the roof is corrugated steel which has replaced the original corrugated galvanised iron roofing.

Most of the door and window openings are original and feature flat arches. Window openings have bull nosed brick sills and some door openings have recent brick on edge thresholds and some have early slate slabs. A mix of windows has been used in the building. There are two sizes of timber framed double hung windows, the larger of which originally had six paned top sashes made of clear glass and glazed glass bottom sashes. There are also small timber framed windows with single horizontal and vertical glazing bars to the top and bottom sashes, and the top sash was originally made of glass louvers whereas the bottom sashes were fixed glass. Most of the windows have been altered substantially and some have been boarded up, some have been fixed with wire reinforced glass or with patterned obscure glass. The original external doors used in the building were timber framed timber panel doors with six paned fanlights. Some of the doors have been retained in their original condition whereas some doors have been changed to flat panel timber and metal doors and some of these doors had additional steel, safety grill gates added to their outer face.

Internally, the building was originally divided into a general waiting room, a ladies room, a broom closet and two sets of toilets. The configuration of the waiting and ladies rooms has been altered and the two rooms have been further divided into three rooms, with one room used as a store, another as a locker room for station personnel and the third room serving as a communications room. The toilets were originally a lavatory with three cubicles which were accessible from within the ladies room as well as from the platform and a separate toilet area which had urinals and cubicles that were accessible from the platform. Both toilet areas are no longer in use but they have most of their original features intact including the cubicle partitions and doors and the toilet fixtures in the lavatory. The ladies room and general waiting room have original timber floorboards and possibly original small corrugated iron sheet ceilings.

Generally in a good condition, there are no repairs or maintenance issues with the building. The rooms and toilets are in an overall good condition although some of the early toilet fixtures have developed water stains over time. The internal configuration of the building has been compromised as the waiting rooms have been subdivided into three rooms. Most of the windows and some of the doors have been modified. However overall the building has a moderate level of integrity.

=== Platform Building: Platform 5 (1891) ===
The "Standard Eddy" side platform building served as a waiting room and was moved in 1926 from Platform 3 and 4 to its current location on Platform 5. It is a single room rectangular building made of weatherboards and a skillion corrugated steel roof with engaged timber columns at the front corners of the building. The building has a canopy made of plasterboard panels with timber curtain board fascia supported on cast iron posts and some modern steel and some early cast iron brackets. The only entrance to the waiting room is from the platform but it is no longer open to public access and has locked steel grill gates.

The waiting room has retained a number of its original internal features, including the weatherboards, the ceiling rose, timber framed double hung windows with cast iron ventilators, a boarded up chimney breast and possibly early wooden benches.

The building is in an overall good condition. Some deterioration has occurred to the upper part of the weatherboard wall on the eastern side of the building. Internally, the room is in a reasonably good condition. However it has a minor problem of peeling paint to the surfaces of the chimney breast and the weatherboard walls. The waiting room is overall in a reasonable state of preservation with a moderate level of integrity, although a few elements have been compromised such as the original chimney breast which has been bricked up and the main opening which has steel gates added on.

=== Overhead Booking Office (1923) ===
The existing overhead booking office is located on the footbridge. The building is constructed of pre-cast concrete panels which furnish the appearance of timber weatherboard construction and a hipped roof with a transverse gable in corrugated metal sheeting.

The overhead booking office has been altered significantly internally and externally; as such, there are no original features incorporated as part of the booking office. The Overhead Booking Office is in a very good condition and needs no immediate maintenance work.

=== Platforms ===
Platform 5 (Down) is a wayside platform with original pre-cast concrete face. Platform 1 (Down) has in-situ concrete face and Platform 2 (Up) has a pre-cast concrete face and together they form an island platform arrangement. Platform 3 (Down) and Platform 4 (Up) have pre-cast concrete faces and also form an island platform arrangement. All the platforms have asphalt surfaces.

The platform along Hennessey Road is in a very poor condition. It is disused and not visible as it is overgrown with trees and shrubs. Platform 1 and 2 are in good condition although they are both non-operational and unused. Platforms 3, 4 and 5 are in an overall good condition

=== Canopies (1995) ===
The canopy on Platform 1 and 2 is a modern awning structure resting on steel cantilevered beams, and steel posts with concrete bases and has a flat corrugated steel and timber panelled roof with metal fascia.

The canopy on Platform 1 and 2 is in an overall good condition, except for the fascia which has chipping and peeling paint. The canopies on Platforms 3, 4 and 5 are also in a good condition and do not require any immediate maintenance.

=== Footbridge (1892) ===
The existing footbridge consists of a series of reinforced concrete double arches and steel girder cantilever spans and is amongst the earliest examples of the use of concrete for the piers and columns of a railway footbridge. The two star motif cast iron newel posts of the stairs to Platform 5 are remaining evidence of Inter-War building activity on the site. As originally built the footbridge extended all the way to the platform that existed along Hennessey Street. In 1926 the footbridge was extended to the south to access Platform 5. In 1994 the part of the bridge span leading to Hennessey Road was removed and it was terminated at Platform 1 and 2.

The footbridge is generally in a good condition. However the girders of the footbridge between Platforms 2 and 3 show signs of deterioration. The disused section of the footbridge along Hennessey Road is in a very poor condition. The footbridge has been considerably altered especially the termination of its northern end bordering Hennessey Street. However the 2 star motif cast iron newel posts of the stairs to Platform 5 are remaining evidence of Inter-War building activity on the site.

=== Overbridge (1892) ===
The Strand/ Meta Road Overbridge crosses over the western end of the railway station platform and runs parallel to the footbridge. The structure is an iron and steel girder and jack-arch bridge with a concrete deck, brick piers on all platforms and brick balustrades .

The overbridge is in good condition. However the brickwork parapets show traces of organic growth. Based upon visual inspection the overbridge appears to have retained most of its original fabric including the plate girders, the brick piers and brick balustrades.

=== Landscape/Natural Features ===
The palm tree on Platform 1 and 2 is possibly the tree that was planted on the platform in the 1920s The palm tree is in a moderate condition.

=== Moveable Items ===
The bench seats in the waiting room of the platform building (1926) are original although they have been added onto (in a sensitive manner) and converted into shelves for storage.

=== Archaeological Potential ===
The site has moderate archaeological potential. The north-eastern platform, bordering Hennessey Street along with the discontinued and highly dilapidated section of the existing footbridge is of substantial archaeological value. However, as the platform and these associated features are no longer in use and have been are in disrepair it is possible that some significant original fabric may have been lost.

== Heritage listing ==
Croydon Railway Station has State significance as the existing station arrangement with railway structures dating from the 1892 quadruplication and 1927 sextuplication of the line is illustrative of the expansion of the railways in the late 19th and early 20th century undertaken to accommodate suburban development along the line and to the west. Designed under the direction of Commissioner Edward Eddy, the extant 1890s platform building is largely intact and it demonstrates the first use of island platforms in NSW and is one of four extant examples of this type of station building design, known as the "Standard Eddy". The 1920s "initial island" building and 1940s "Railway Stripped Functionalist" building have aesthetic significance and together are able to demonstrate the shift in the architectural styles employed by the railways during the first half of the 20th century.

The 1890s footbridge is significant and relatively uncommon in terms of its overall form and construction technique as it was one of the first footbridges in the Sydney Metropolitan region which has reinforced concrete employed for its piers and columns. The 1920s palm tree is significant as it provides insight into the landscaping patterns that existed at Croydon station and others stations along the line during the early 20th century.

Croydon railway station was listed on the New South Wales State Heritage Register on 2 April 1999 having satisfied the following criteria.

The place is important in demonstrating the course, or pattern, of cultural or natural history in New South Wales.

Croydon Railway Station is historically significant as the existing station arrangement with extant railway structures dating from the 1892 quadruplication and 1927 sextuplication of the line is able to clearly illustrate the expansion of the railways in the late 19th and early 20th century undertaken to accommodate suburban development along the line and to the west. The extant 19th and 20th century platforms, buildings, footbridge and overbridge are collectively able to demonstrate a former era of travel.

The place is important in demonstrating aesthetic characteristics and/or a high degree of creative or technical achievement in New South Wales.

Croydon Railway Station has aesthetic significance with its 1890s "Standard Eddy" building which has been altered in terms of its relocation from a typical island platform to a wayside platform, but still retains characteristic features of this type of station building namely the cantilevered awnings with wide fascia. The 1920s "initial island" platform building has been altered internally but it retains a linear form, gable roof and integrated awnings. The 1940s "Railway Stripped Functionalist" building with its cantilevered awnings and steel-framed windows has typical features of this type of station building and is aesthetically significant as it demonstrates a shift in the style from earlier "initial island" platform buildings. The overhead booking office has been altered internally but it retains characteristic features of such buildings, namely the pre-cast concrete panels with weatherboard construction appearance and its location on the footbridge.

The Croydon Station footbridge has technical significance as it was the first time within the Sydney metropolitan area that reinforced concrete was used for the piers and columns of a footbridge.

The place has strong or special association with a particular community or cultural group in New South Wales for social, cultural or spiritual reasons.

The place has the potential to contribute to the local community's sense of place, and can provide a connection to the local community's past.

The place has potential to yield information that will contribute to an understanding of the cultural or natural history of New South Wales.

Croydon Railway Station has moderate archaeological potential. The dilapidated north-eastern platform, bordering Hennessey Street along with the discontinued and highly dilapidated section of the existing footbridge provide useful knowledge about the previous patterns of use and scale of the station complex.

The place possesses uncommon, rare or endangered aspects of the cultural or natural history of New South Wales.

The items at Croydon Railway Station which have aesthetic and technical rarity include the "Standard Eddy" platform building, the footbridge. Croydon Station is one of the three stations including Homebush and Summer Hill, in the Metropolitan area which have extant "Standard Eddy" platform buildings. Another extant "Standard Eddy" platform building within NSW is at Katoomba station which is unique in terms of its curved form along the platform. The 1890s footbridge with its system of double arches and piers is relatively uncommon in the Sydney Metro region and it was the first footbridge in the Sydney area which used reinforced concrete for the arches and piers and is in terms of its style and techniques a rare example.

The initial island platform building, "Railway Stripped Functionalist" building and overhead booking office and overbridge are common types of standard railway structures.

The place is important in demonstrating the principal characteristics of a class of cultural or natural places/environments in New South Wales.

The platform building at Croydon Railway Station is in a largely intact condition externally and it is a good representation of the "Standard Eddy" design. The other platform buildings are representative of standard types of railway platform buildings and are reasonably well preserved examples. The overbridge with most of its original fabric intact is also a good representative of jack-arch bridge construction.

== Gallery ==
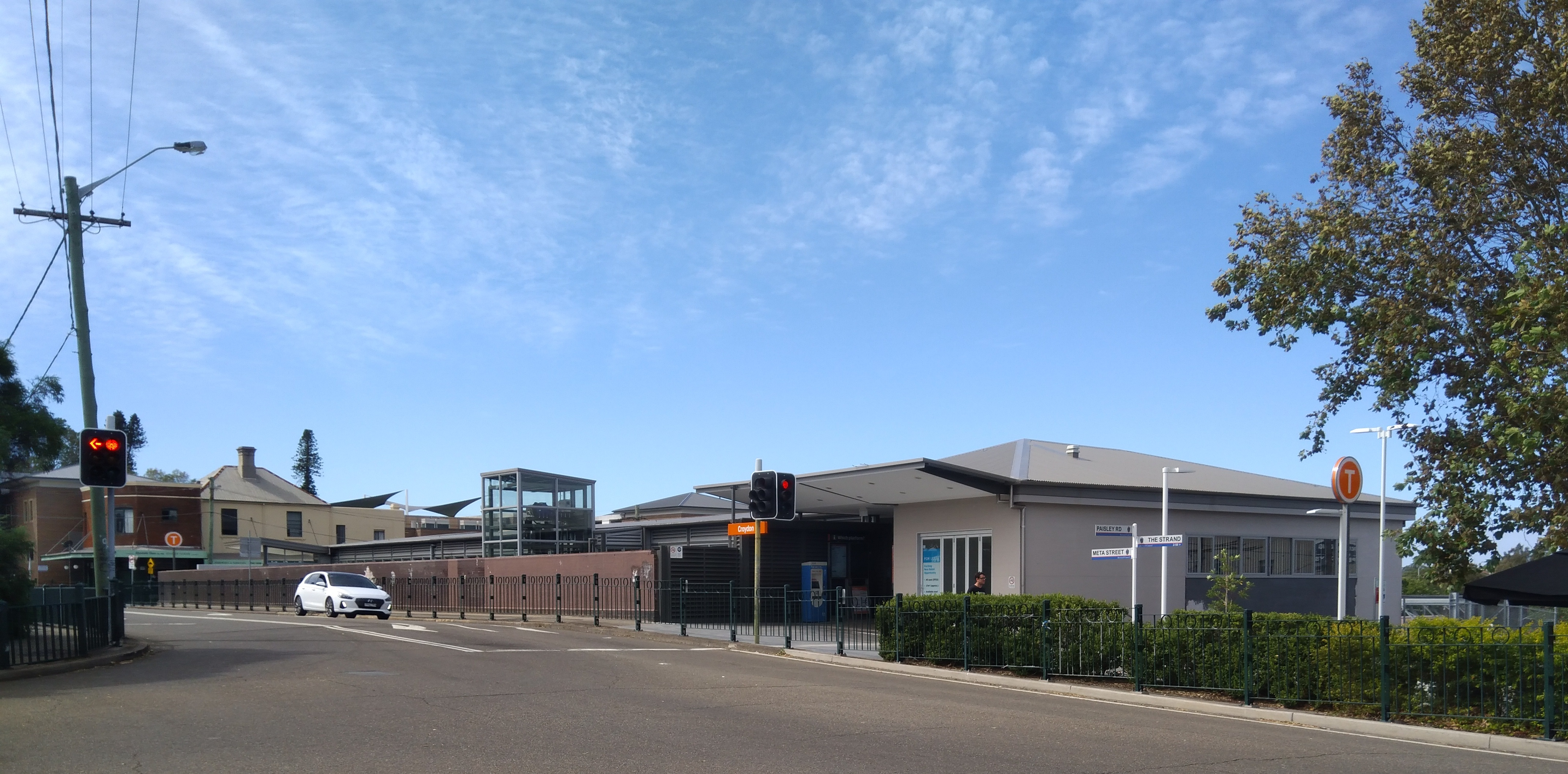
The Strand entrance in April 2018

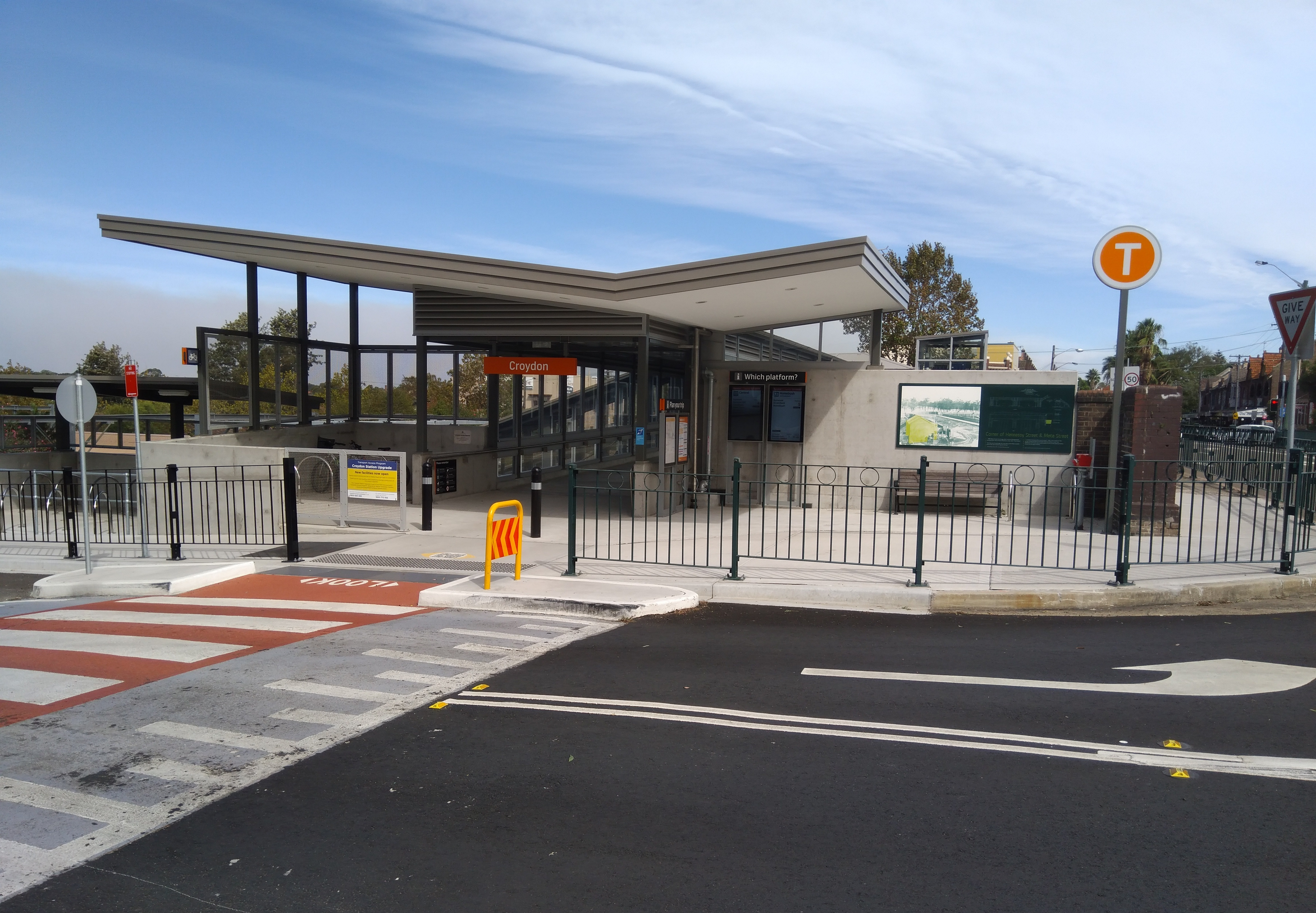
Hennessy Street entrance in April 2018

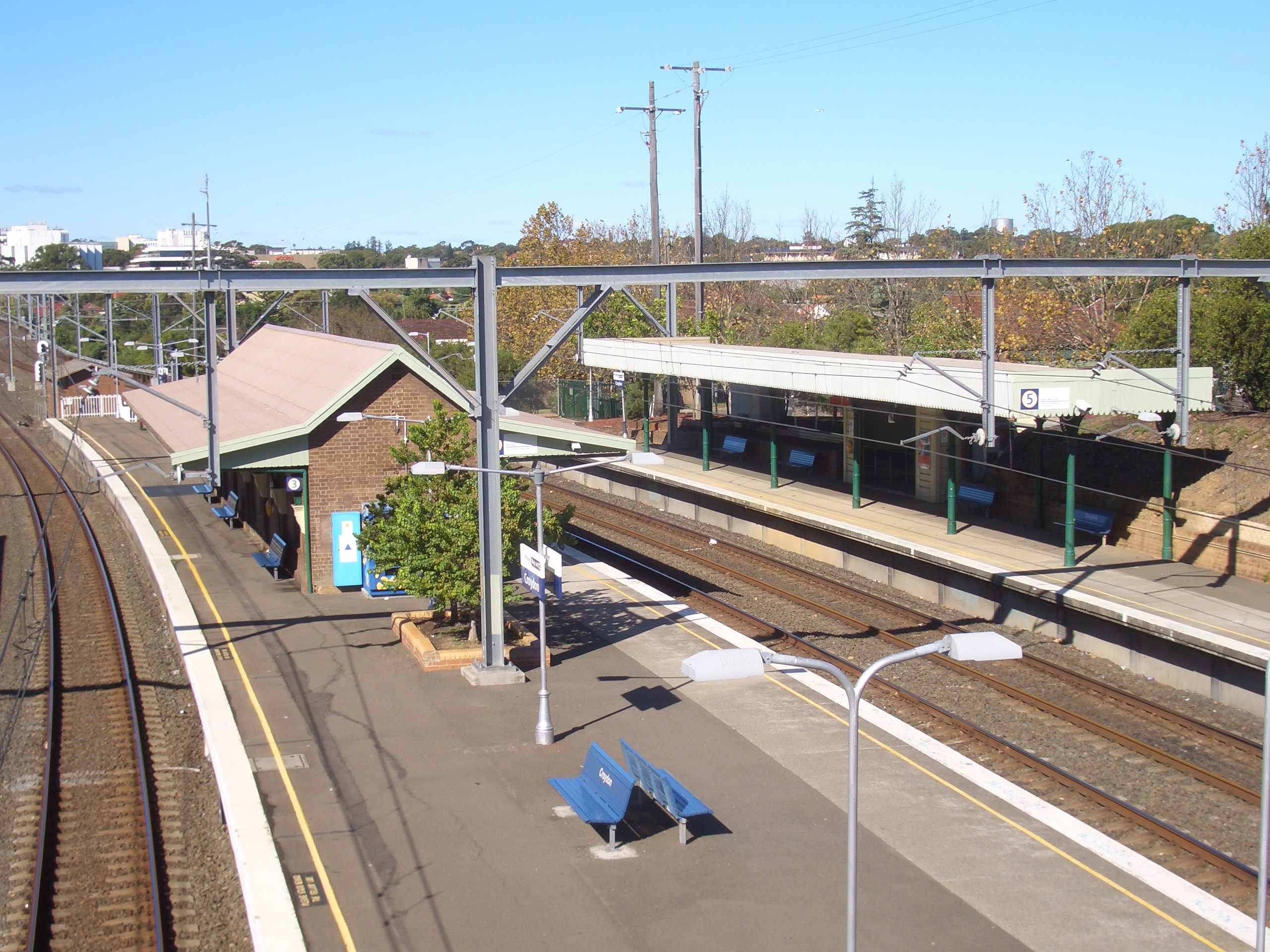
Eastbound view of the station in May 2007

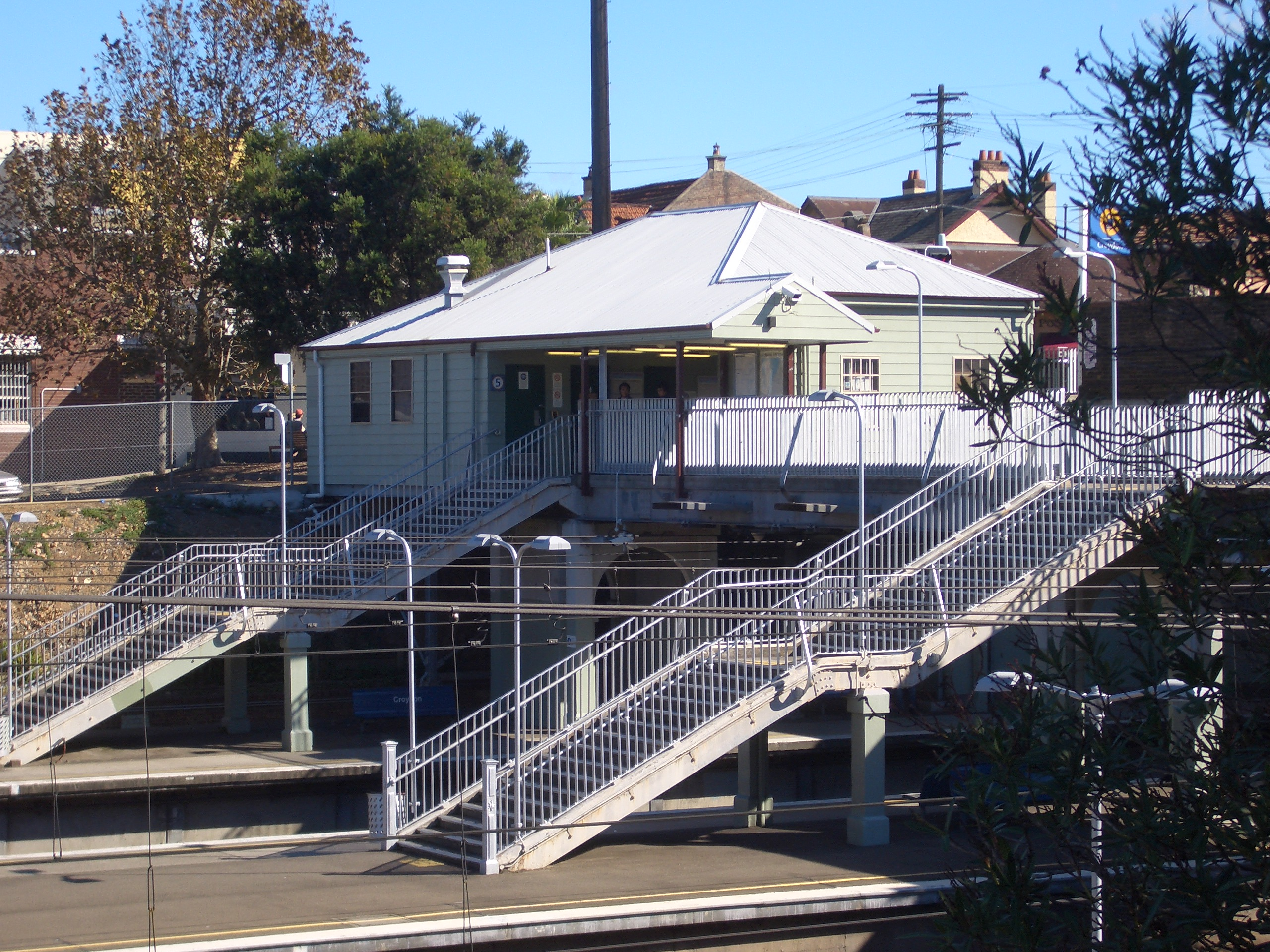
View of the former bridge and entrance building from Hennessy Street in May 2007

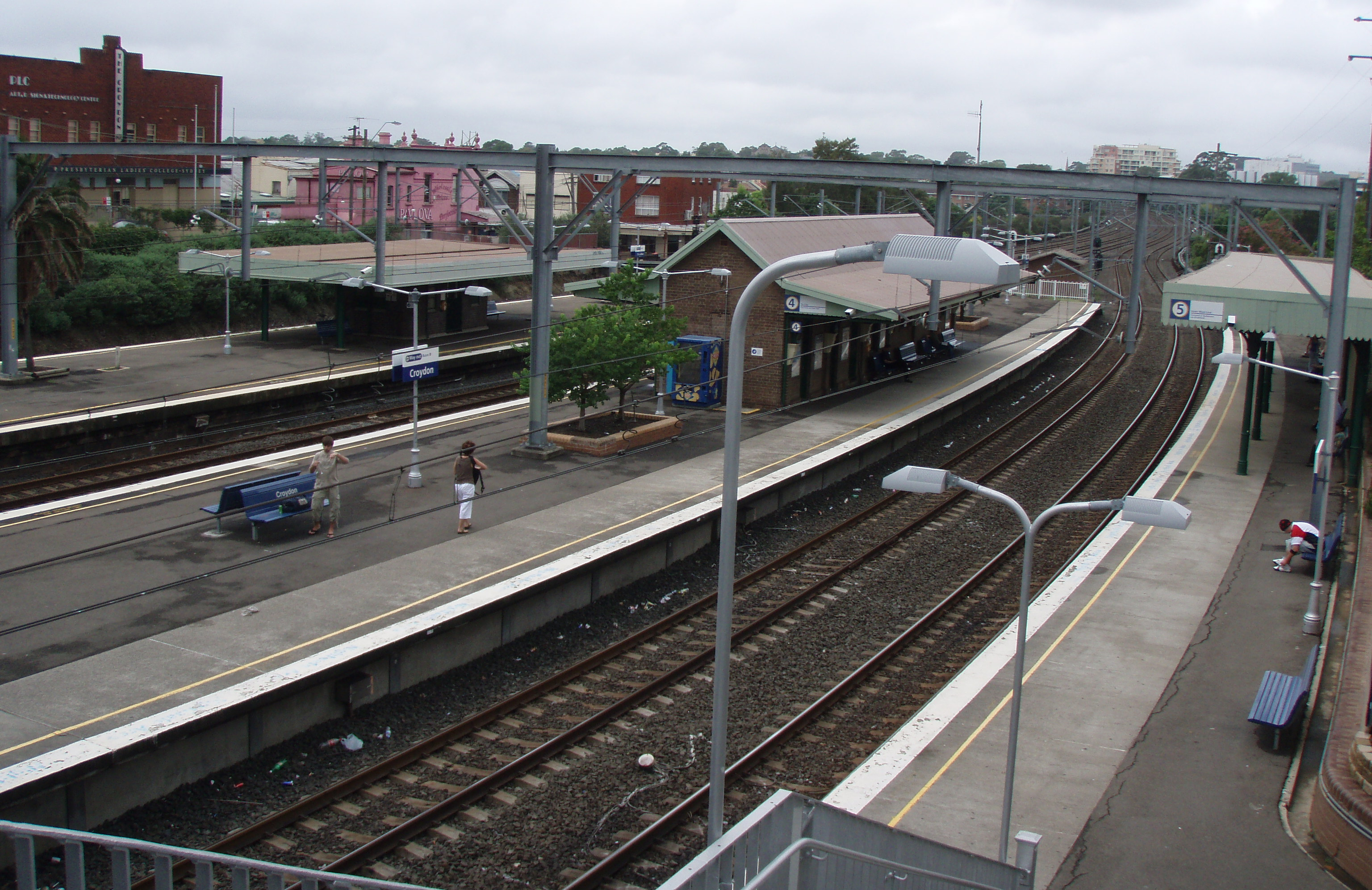
Platforms in March 2007
