= Croydon Sewer Vent =

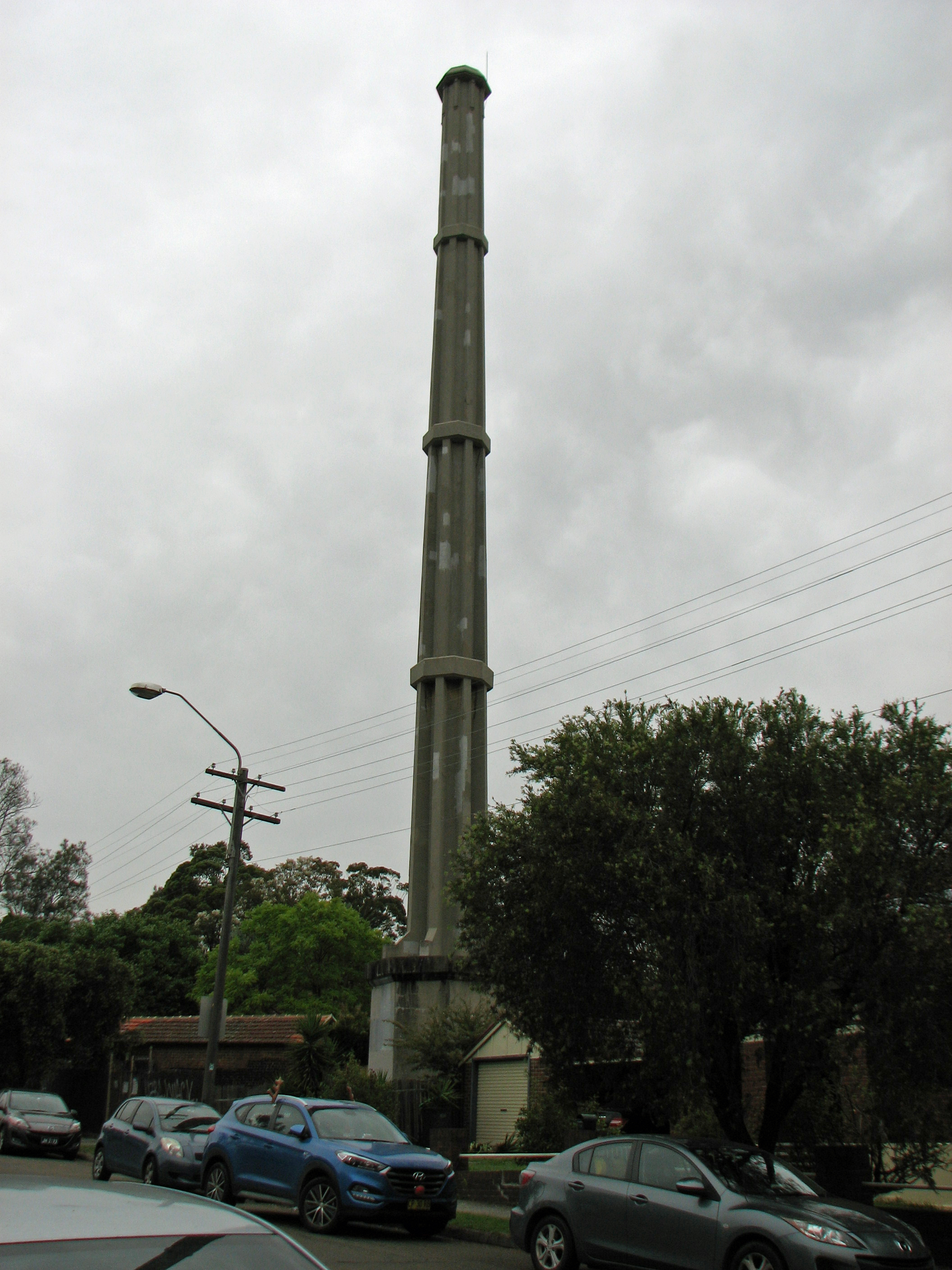
- The Croydon Sewer Vent

- Location within Sydney Location within Australia
- 33°52′57″S 151°06′50″E
- Location: Paisley Road, Croydon, Municipality of Burwood, New South Wales, Australia

History
- Built: 1922

Site notes
- Architect(s): Metropolitan Board of Water Supply and Sewerage
- Owner: Sydney Water

New South Wales Heritage Register
- Official name: Croydon Sewer Vent; Sewer Vent; Paisley Road Sewer Vent
- Type: State heritage (built)
- Designated: 15 November 2002
- Reference no.: 1639
- Type: Other - Utilities - Sewerage
- Category: Utilities - Sewerage
- Builders: Metropolitan Board of Water Supply and Sewerage

The Croydon Sewer Vent is a heritage-listed sewer ventilation stack located on a small parcel of land adjacent to 12 Paisley Road, Croydon, New South Wales, a suburb of Sydney, Australia. It was designed and built by the Metropolitan Board of Water Supply and Sewerage in 1922. It is also known as Sewer Vent and Paisley Road Sewer Vent. The property is owned by Sydney Water, a statutory corporation of the Government of New South Wales. It was added to the New South Wales State Heritage Register on 15 November 2002.

== History ==
The Main Western Carrier which fed into Botany sewer farm was completed in 1897 and encompasses the major crossing of Wolli Creek and Cooks River each by triple barrel 1800 mm dia. wrought iron/steel aqueducts. There are triple barrel brick arch aqueducts at the ends. Soon after construction more sewage was being collected from this newer Western arm than there was from the original Southern Division arm. This is even with allowing for dramatic increase in flow within the first few years of the Southern Division.

The Western Branch Main Sewer which feeds into the Main Western Carrier was completed in stages all the way through to Strathfield. Work was completed on this sewer in 1904.

The section also contains the Croydon (1922) and Burwood (Strathfield) (1919) concrete vent stacks which were built because of damage caused by gases from the then new Homebush Bay Abattoir after it opened in 1916.

In 1888 before the Botany Scheme was even commissioned, Burwood Council had requested a sewage treatment plant for Hen & Chicken Bay on the Parramatta River. They were told by the NSW Government to wait for the Western Suburbs Sewer and the Western Branch Main Sewer is the result of that undertaking. Had the Burwood scheme proceeded, the Western Branch Main Sewer may not have been built in the location it was eventually constructed.

== Description ==
A reinforced concrete vent stack built in 1922, octagonal in plan form up to the top of the pedestal from which begins a tapered shaft circular in section with radiating support ribs and three octagonal concrete bands along the length of the shaft. There is neoclassical consoles brackets at the top of the shaft underneath a projecting cornice. The pedestal would be approximately 6m high. A steel entrance door is on the eastern elevation below a rendered hood mould over the door. A galvanised corrugated iron shed is located a metre to the north of this vent stack over the manhole to the main. The location of the site of the vent shaft is directly off Paisley Road and is a triangular site all now paved in concrete. Adjoining development is domestic since the early 20th century, and across the road is the railway line.

Condition overall would appear to be good with some evidence of horizontal cracking towards the upper portions of the pedestal. Some spalling is evident up the shaft. A lightning conductor is located on the southern side of the shaft.

The vent shaft is prominently located and the surrounding topography makes this shaft a landmark for a considerable distance from most vantage points. A lack of large scale and high-density buildings contributes to its relatively open visual qualities within this urban environment.

This shaft has a larger scale base than that of the Wentworth Road shaft.

Evidence remains on the street frontage of an original timber gate post some 6 inches squared with original coach bolts and gudgeons still in place. A late 20th century wire cage gate and steel frame is now fitted to the entry of the site.

The shaft and its surrounding fence have little if any immediate streetscape value or give little if any contribution to the surrounding dwellings, although its landmark quality to the broader townscape is most notable.

The paling fence would appear to be late 20th century and not original.

Considerably intact.

== Heritage listing ==
As at 4 January 2001, the vent shaft is a locally prominent landmark and one of only two like structures in Sydney Water's system, which plays an important function to the main western sewer system. The unusual design and reinforced concrete construction is rare for this type of vent on a State level.

Croydon Sewer Vent was listed on the New South Wales State Heritage Register on 15 November 2002 having satisfied the following criteria.

The place is important in demonstrating the course, or pattern, of cultural or natural history in New South Wales.

The vent has tangible historical associations with the western branch main sewer and through the influence of sewer gases generated from the Homebush abattoir, an element which has now been removed forever.

The place is important in demonstrating aesthetic characteristics and/or a high degree of creative or technical achievement in New South Wales.

The vent is a prominent landmark visually, particularly to the considerable area west and south of the vent stack.

The place has a strong or special association with a particular community or cultural group in New South Wales for social, cultural or spiritual reasons.

It is likely the vent stack holds some value to the local community in its function and landmark value.

The place has potential to yield information that will contribute to an understanding of the cultural or natural history of New South Wales.

The vent plays an important function in the servicing of the western branch main sewer.

The place possesses uncommon, rare or endangered aspects of the cultural or natural history of New South Wales.

Regarding its design and construction it is rare on a State level and one of only two in the Sydney Water system.

The place is important in demonstrating the principal characteristics of a class of cultural or natural places/environments in New South Wales.

In terms of vent function alone, it is representative of the function it has played in the operation of sewer systems.

== See also ==
- Sydney Water
