= Croydon Public School =

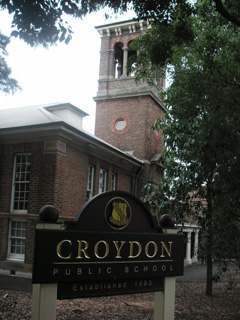

Location
- Croydon, Sydney; Australia
- Coordinates: 33°52′48″S 151°6′55″E

Information
- Type: Public, co-educational, primary, day school
- Motto: In all things be prepared
- Established: 1884
- Principal: Cathy Lucantonio
- Enrolment: ~596 (K–6)
- Campus: Suburban
- Colours: Gold and maroon
- Website: croydon-p.schools.nsw.gov.au

Croydon Public School is a public, co-educational, primary school, located in Croydon, an inner-western suburb of Sydney, New South Wales, Australia. It is located within the Burwood Council district.

Established in February 1884, Croydon is historically important as one of the first schools built after the Public Instruction Act of 1880. The school currently caters for approximately 596 children from Kindergarten to Year 6. Following completion of Year 6, most students are placed in either Ashfield Boys High School or Burwood Girls High School.

== History ==
Croydon Public was founded in February 1884. Due to the school being built in a very prosperous era, Croydon's original building, built by William Kemp, is in the "grand Classic" style and received much favorable comment at the time. Due to the expense of building such schools, the Education Department was forced to restrict building money from 1884, and therefore few of these extravagant style of schools were built. Other examples of the style are Summer Hill (1884) and Bourke Street (1883). The building at Croydon remains in almost original condition.

The motto of the school is "in all things be prepared".

== Notable alumni ==
- Eric Dunlop – Lecturer at Armidale Teachers' College; Pioneer in the development of folk museums in Australia
- Emeritus Professor John D. Bain – Professor of Teaching and Learning, Griffith University, Brisbane, from 1991 to 2004.

== See also ==
- List of Government schools in New South Wales
