= Burwood Girls High School =

Burwood Girls' High School

Location
- Croydon, New South Wales; Australia; 33°52′31″S 151°6′47″E

Information
- Type: Government-funded single-sex comprehensive secondary day school
- Motto: Not for ourselves alone
- Established: 1929; 97 years ago
- School district: Strathfield; Metropolitan South
- Educational authority: New South Wales Department of Education
- Oversight: NSW Education Standards Authority
- Principal: Mia Kumar
- Teaching staff: 79.2 FTE (2018)
- Years: 7–12
- Gender: Girls
- Enrolment: 1,152 (2018)
- Campus: Suburban
- Colours: Navy blue and gold
- Website: burwoodg-h.schools.nsw.gov.au

Burwood Girls' High School is a public, comprehensive, secondary school for girls, located in Croydon, an Inner West suburb of Sydney, New South Wales, Australia.

Established in 1929, the school enrolled approximately 1,150 students in 2018, from Year 7 to Year 12, of whom one percent identified as Indigenous Australians and 69 percent were from a language background other than English. The school is operated by the NSW Department of Education in accordance with a curriculum developed by the New South Wales Education Standards Authority; the principal is Mia Kumar.

== Overview ==
The school's catchment area includes the suburbs of Croydon, Burwood, Croydon Park, Ashfield, Summer Hill, Haberfield, and Five Dock. The school community is diverse in terms of ethnicity, culture and socio-economic mix.

In the 2006 Higher School Certificate, the National Education Directory of Australia named Burwood Girls High School the sixth best performing school, and the best non-selective public school in Sydney's Inner West.

=== Curriculum ===
Burwood Girls High School is registered and accredited with the New South Wales Board of Studies, and therefore follows the mandated curriculum for all years. Students may also choose from a select number of Vocational Education and Training (VET) subjects through TAFE NSW and additional languages through The Open High School.

In the 2006 HSC, the National Education Directory of Australia named Burwood Girls the sixth best performing school, and the best non-selective public school in Sydney's Inner West.

== Notable alumni ==
- Lorraine Bayly AM – actress; founding member of the Ensemble Theatre Company; named as one of 100 Variety Entertainers of the Century, recipient of 3 Logie Awards
- Lee Da-hae – South Korean actress
- Jennie George AO – former member of the Australian House of Representatives, representing the Division of Throsby
- Gracie Otto – actress, film producer, writer and film director
- Dale Spender AM – feminist; researcher and writer

== See also ==
- List of government schools in New South Wales
- Education in Australia
