= Croydon, New South Wales =

Croydon
- Suburb
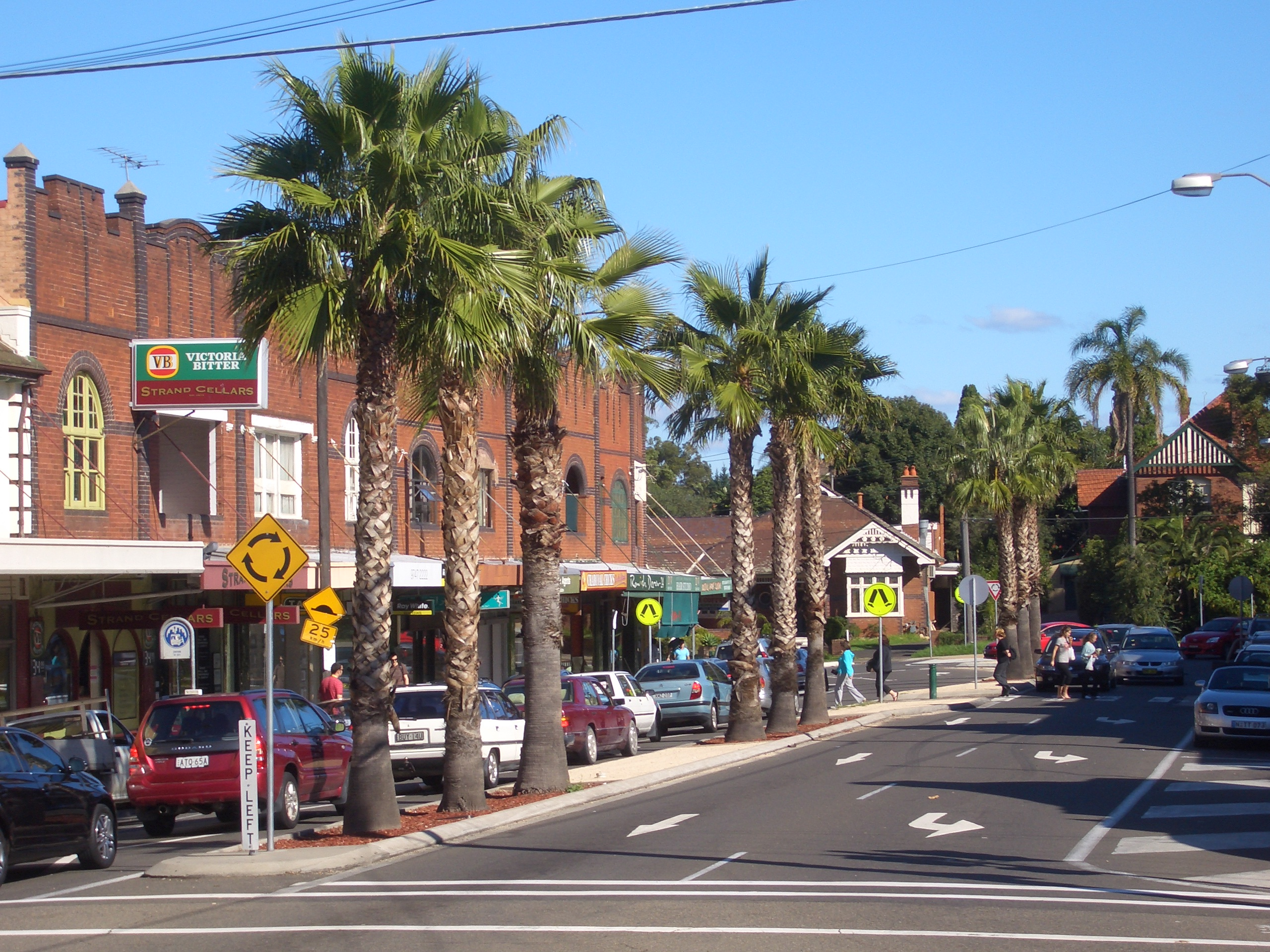
- The Strand, Croydon

- Interactive map of Croydon
- Coordinates: 33°52′45″S 151°06′56″E
- Country: Australia
- State: New South Wales
- City: Sydney
- LGAs: Inner West Council; Municipality of Burwood
- Location: 9 km (5.6 mi) west of Sydney CBD

Government
  - State electorate: Strathfield
  - Federal divisions: Reid; Grayndler

Area
  - Total: 2.44 km^{2} (0.94 sq mi)
- Elevation: 23 m (75 ft)

Population
  - Total: 10,755 (2021 census)
  - Density: 4,408/km^{2} (11,416/sq mi)
- Postcode: 2132
Suburbs around Croydon
Concord	Five Dock	Haberfield
Burwood	Croydon	Ashfield
Burwood Heights	Croydon Park	Ashbury

Croydon is a suburb in the Inner West of Sydney, in the state of New South Wales, Australia. It is located 9 kilometres (5.6 mi) west of the Sydney central business district. Croydon is split between the two local government areas of Municipality of Burwood and the Inner West Council.

The suburb is nestled between the commercial centres of Ashfield and Burwood. It is bounded by Parramatta Road to the north, Iron Cove Creek to the east, Arthur Street to the south and a number of different streets to the west. To the north are Kings and Canada Bays on the closest reach of the Parramatta River, to the northwest is Concord Hospital and the Olympic Games complex at Homebush Bay. To the south is Canterbury Racecourse. The suburb shares its name with Croydon, a large district and borough in the south of London, England.

The traditional owners of the land on which Croydon is situated are the Wangal people of the Eora nation.

== History ==
=== Aboriginal anthropology ===
Prior to the arrival of Europeans, the area now known as Croydon was part of the land which the Wangal people lived. Their focus of tribal land was believed to be centred on Concord and stretched east to the swampland of Long Cove Creek. The land was heavily wooded at the time with tall eucalypts, blackbutts and turpentines covering the higher ground and mangroves, swamp oaks and swamp mahoganies in the lower swampy ground of Iron Cove Creek. The diet of the Wangal was primarily fish so they spent most of their time living near the shores of the Parramatta River and fishing in canoes. The land away from the river shores provided fruits, berries and edible plants as well as possums and kangaroos, which were killed both for food and their skins.

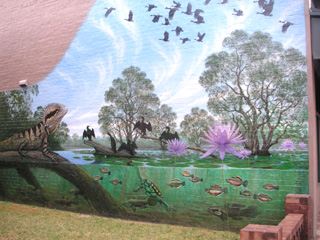
Mural in Elizabeth St, Croydon, an artistic impression of what the area may have looked like prior to the arrival of the First Fleet

The arrival of the First Fleet in 1788 and the start of modern Australia had, as one could expect, an influence on the people living in the area. One of their leaders, Bennelong, befriended the first governor of New South Wales, Arthur Phillip, and was taken by him to England.

After establishing the colony at Sydney Cove in early 1788, a second settlement was established at Rose Hill (now called Parramatta) later that same year to establish farms to feed the people. Within a year or so, a rough land route had been established between the two settlements, traversing through the territory of the Cadigal, Wangal and Burramattagal people. This rough track later became the main artery of the expanding Greater Sydney and, as the northern boundary of what is now Croydon, influenced modern settlement in the area.

=== Early British settlement ===
Governor Phillip showed great reluctance to grant large amounts of land to his colonists, restricting land grants to the towns and people actively planning to farm the land. After his return to England in 1792, acting governor Major Francis Grose and his successor Captain William Paterson pursued the opposite policy granting large swathes of land to their friends prior to the arrival of the second official governor John Hunter in 1795.

The first land grant in the Croydon area was to Captain John Townson in April 1793 who received 100 acres (0.4 km^{2}) on Parramatta Road stretching west from Iron Cove Creek and south to what is now Queen Street. Further grants were made in 1794 to: Private J Eades (25 acres on Parramatta Road to the west of Townson's holding); James Brackenrig (30 acres on the other side of Eades's land); Augustus Alt, the first surveyor-general of NSW, (100 acres stretching south from Townson's land to roughly what is now Thomas Street); and Sarah Nelson (15 acres west of the southern corner of Alt's land in the area now known as Malvern Hill). Alt was the first to take up residence on his land, naming it 'Hermitage Farm'. However, his house was burnt down by a group of indigenous people (possibly led by Pemulwuy) in 1797 and he didn't return to Croydon, establishing himself in neighbouring Ashfield, and selling his property to John Palmer.

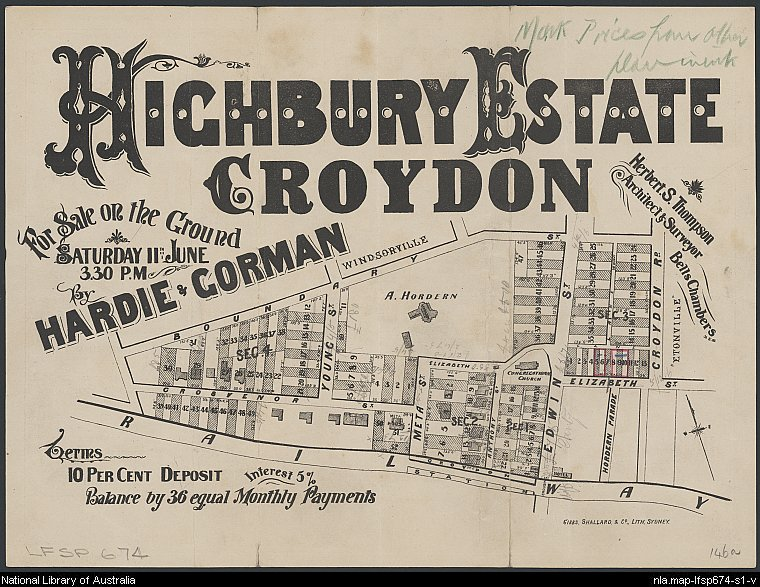
Sales plan for land in the suburb of Croydon, including the boundaries of Anthony Hordern's estate, 1881

By 1820 a large part of the area had been subsumed by Joseph Underwood's large 'Ashfield Park Estate'. This property remained largely intact for more than 40 years, until it was subdivided into large blocks after the death of Elizabeth Underwood in 1858. By this time its proximity to the railway made it a desirable area (the station was originally called Fivedock). One of these subdivisions was the 'Highbury Estate', on part of which Anthony Hordern, son of the founder of the great retail firm, Anthony Hordern & Sons, eventually built his house 'Shubra Hall', just beyond the west border of Ashfield. It later became part of the Presbyterian Ladies' College, the current boundaries of which give an idea of the extent of the Hordern property. The College, including Shubra Hall, the main school building and the Meta Street entrance gates, is now listed on the Register of the National Estate.

From around 1800 to 1860, development in the area was slow with the forests gradually being cleared for orchards and grazing land. The area was a haunt of bushrangers in the 1820s with two major thoroughfares, Parramatta Road to the north and Liverpool Road to the south providing regular opportunities for holdups.

In 1855, the Sydney-Parramatta railway was built through the area which led to a housing boom around the stations at Ashfield and Burwood. This in turn led to local governments forming in the two areas with the land divided roughly equidistant between the two centres. In 1874 a new station was built on the boundary of the two areas and was named Five Dock after another settlement to the north. Because Five Dock was actually a long way north some confusion ensued and Ashfield Council renamed the station in 1876 to Croydon after the suburb in London. The suburb remains divided between the two neighbouring councils to this day.

=== Population growth ===
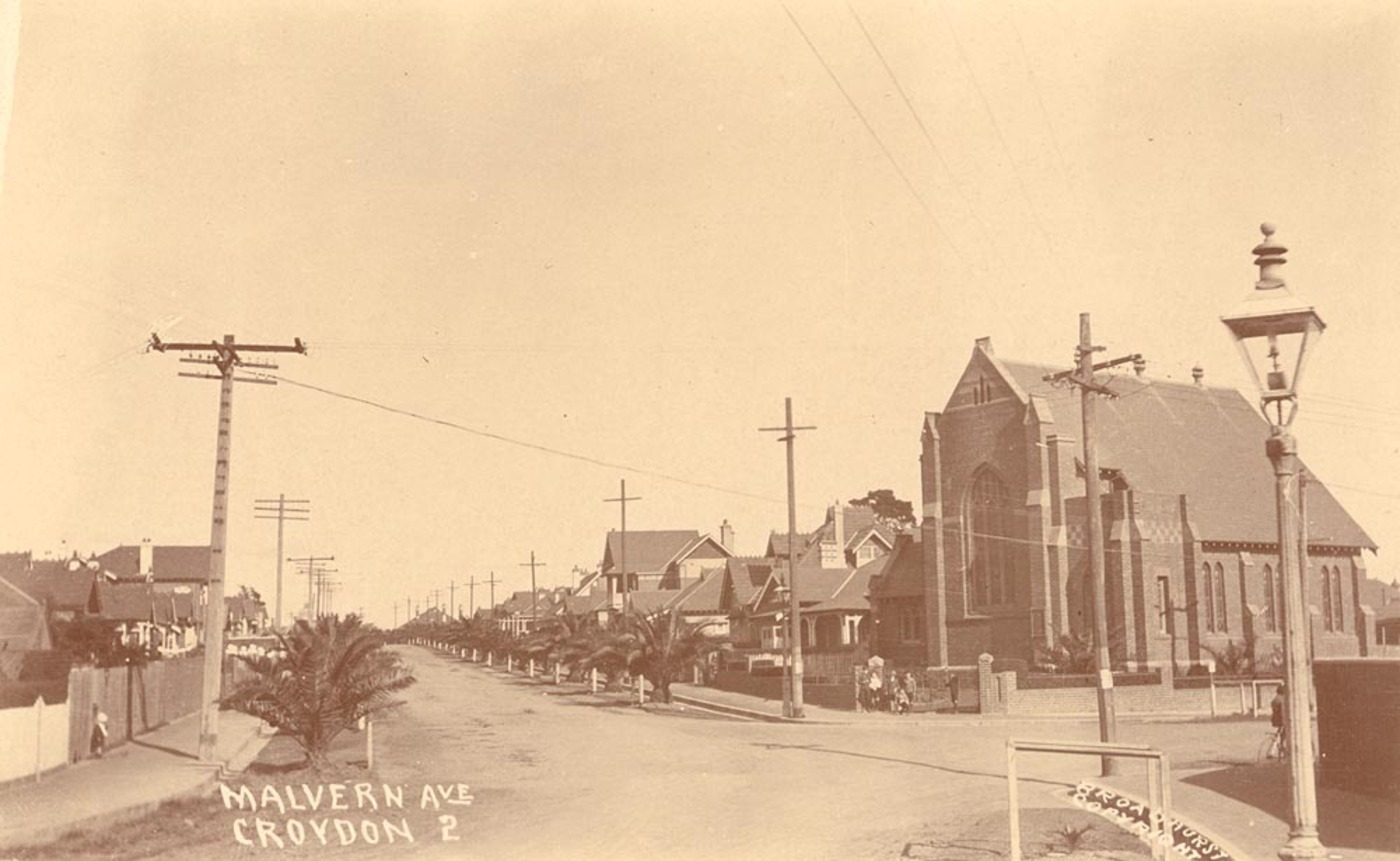
Malvern Avenue in the early 1900s

The first developments were on the northern side of the station around Edwin and Elizabeth Streets. Anthony Hordern built his grand home 'Shubra Hall' in 1869 while many of the shops along Edwin Street North were built in the 1880s. Many houses in the areas surrounding Edwin Street North and Elizabeth St are also of the Victorian style popular in the 1880s and 90s. The 1880s and 90s also saw the establishment of the suburbs first schools with Croydon Public School in 1884, and the Presbyterian Ladies' College relocating from Ashfield in 1891.

The southern side of Croydon remained largely undeveloped until the early 20th century. The Malvern Hill Estate was subdivided in 1909 and designed as a model suburb like Haberfield with wide tree-lined streets and houses built in the then-modern Federation style (a variation of Arts and crafts). Part of the development was the Strand shopping strip, which has survived intact to this day and is now heritage listed in its entirety.

Since World War I, little has changed in Croydon generally. While there have been some blocks of flats built in that time, they account for only around 10% of dwellings in Croydon and many of them are art deco blocks from the 1930s which fit in with the general heritage feel of the area.

== Heritage listings ==
Croydon has a number of heritage-listed sites, including:

- Great Southern and Western railway: Croydon railway station
- Boundary Street: Shubra Hall
- Paisley Road: Croydon Sewer Vent

== Infrastructure ==
=== Commercial area ===
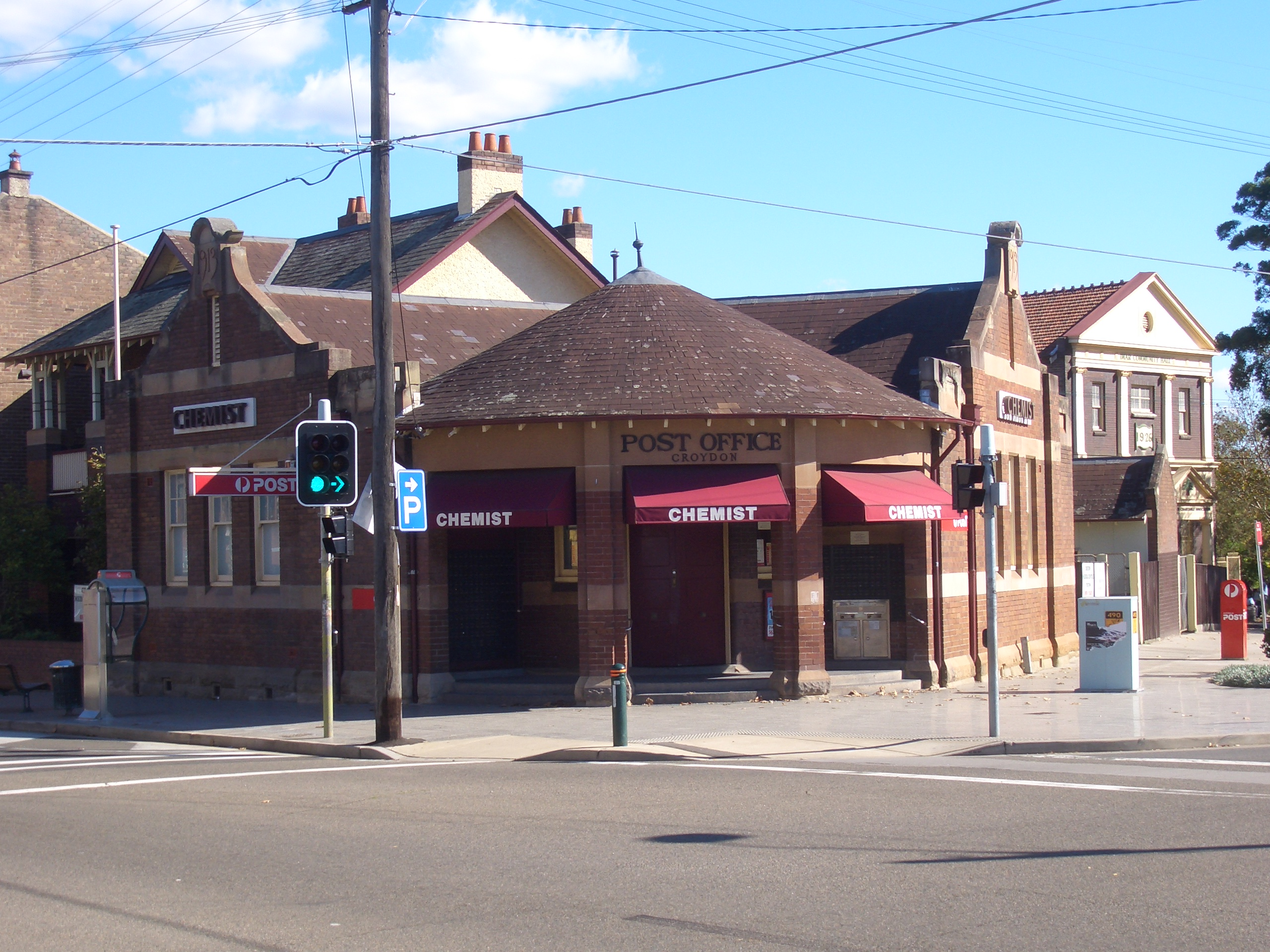
Croydon Post Office, located at the north end of the Strand.

Croydon's principal commercial area is located around the railway station. The Strand, south of the railway line, is the primary commercial strip. It features a number of commercial properties, most of which contain residential units above them. A TAB, two real estate agencies, two grocery stores and various restaurants, cafés and bakeries are among the shops on The Strand. The older Edwin Street precinct, north of the line, consists mainly of specialist businesses such as an accounting firm, engineering firm, and printing shop. Some retailers on the southern side of Parramatta Road also fall just inside Croydon's boundaries.

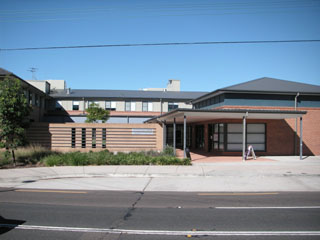
Croydon Health Centre, Liverpool Road.

=== Health ===
From 1893 to 1994, the Western Suburbs Hospital was situated on the corner of Liverpool Road and Brighton Street. After remaining unoccupied for nearly 10 years, it was replaced in the early 2000s with a community health centre and two aged care facilities: Holy Spirit Croydon and The Brighton. Both of these facilities are operated by Catholic Health Australia, and each facility houses over 100 residents.

=== Education ===
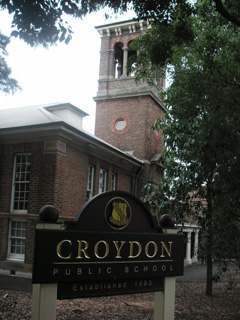
Croydon Public School

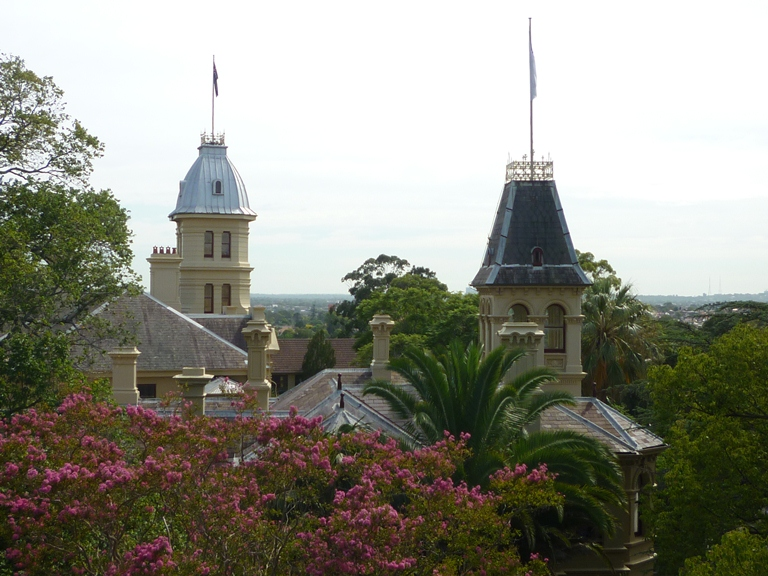
The Presbyterian Ladies' College, which includes the historic Shubra Hall

Croydon has four schools: two primary and two secondary. The suburb's oldest school is Croydon Public School, a primary, co-educational public school, established in 1883. Over 700 students currently attend the school, which is located on Young Street. The suburb's other primary school is Holy Innocents Catholic Primary School, a Roman Catholic, co-educational primary school, established in 1924. It is a much smaller school than Croydon Public School, with a total enrolment of around 200 students. Holy Innocents is located on Queen Street opposite Burwood Girls High School which, despite its name and proximity to Burwood, is in fact situated within the boundaries of Croydon. Currently about 1200 students attend the secondary public school for girls, which was established in 1929.

Another school for girls is Presbyterian Ladies' College, Sydney (PLC Sydney), an independent, Presbyterian, R-12, day and boarding school. The school was established in 1888 but did not move to its current Croydon location until 1891. Around 1150 girls currently attend the school. PLC Sydney is similar to the nearby Burwood Girls High School in that the vast majority of girls from both of these schools are not residents of Croydon, but instead travel to school from surrounding suburbs.

== Transport ==
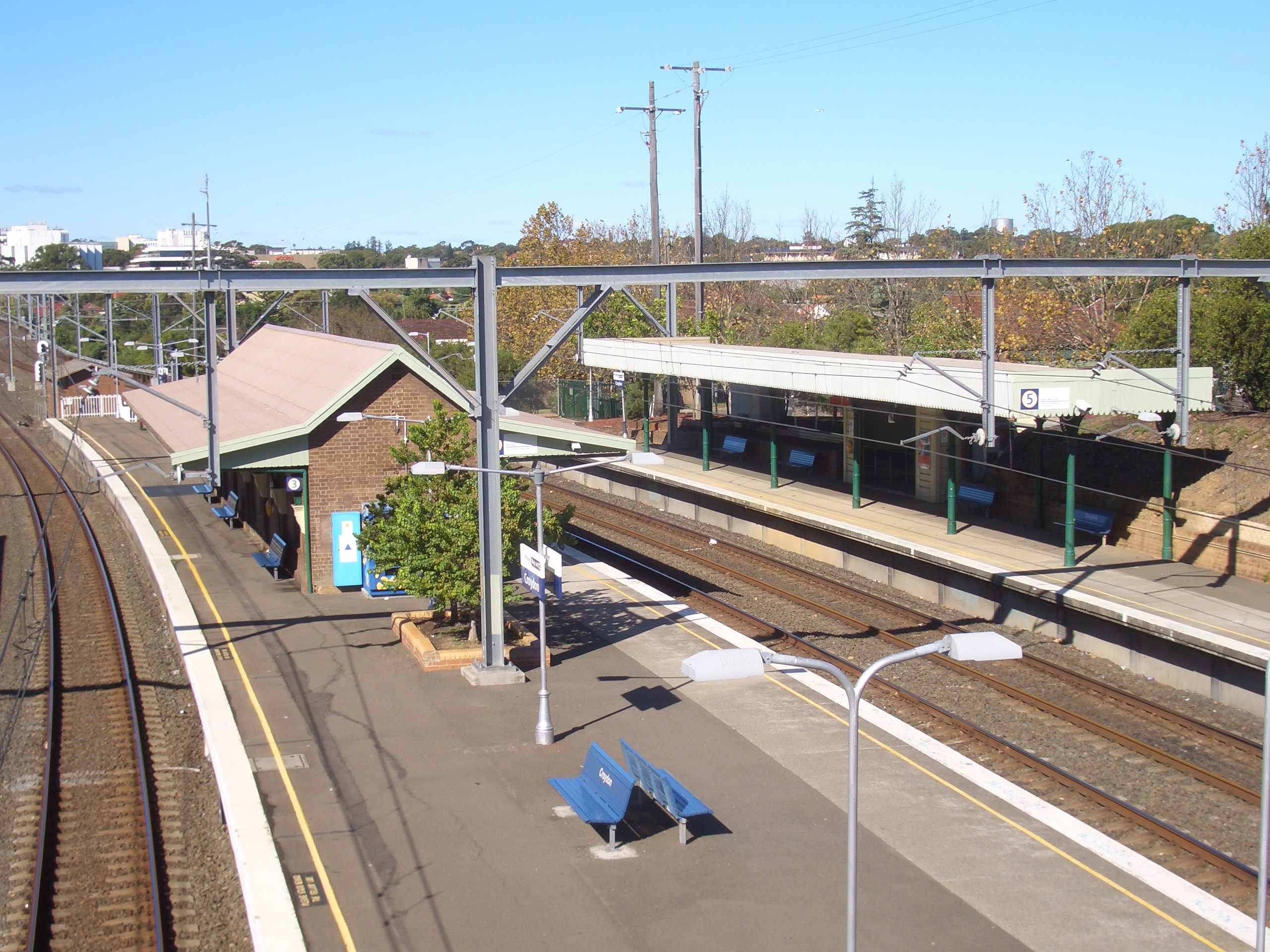
Croydon Railway Station

Croydon railway station is served by the Inner West & Leppington Line of the Sydney Trains network. Like most stations on the Inner West section of the line, it is served by all-stations services every fifteen minutes in both directions: east to the city and west to Homebush or Parramatta.

Seven bus services pass through Croydon:

- The 461 travels down Parramatta Road between Burwood and the city
- The 418 travels down Liverpool Road between Burwood and Tempe
- The 480 and 483 also travel down Liverpool Road between Strathfield and the city
- The 490 and 492 travel from Drummoyne to Burwood via Queen Street, Croydon. They then travel through the southern part of Croydon with the 492 continuing on to Rockdale and the 490 continuing to Hurstville
- The 491 travels down Frederick Street and Elizabeth Street between Five Dock and Ashfield and then on to Hurstville

Croydon is sandwiched between two major roads: Parramatta Road and Liverpool Road. Within Croydon itself, there is only one road bridge (Meta St bridge) over the railway line which connects the north and south parts of the suburb.

Up until 1948, Croydon and neighbouring Croydon Park were also serviced by electric tram services running between Ashfield Station and the respective terminuses at Mortlake and Cabarita Park. These were subsequently replaced by routes 464 and 466.

== Landmarks ==
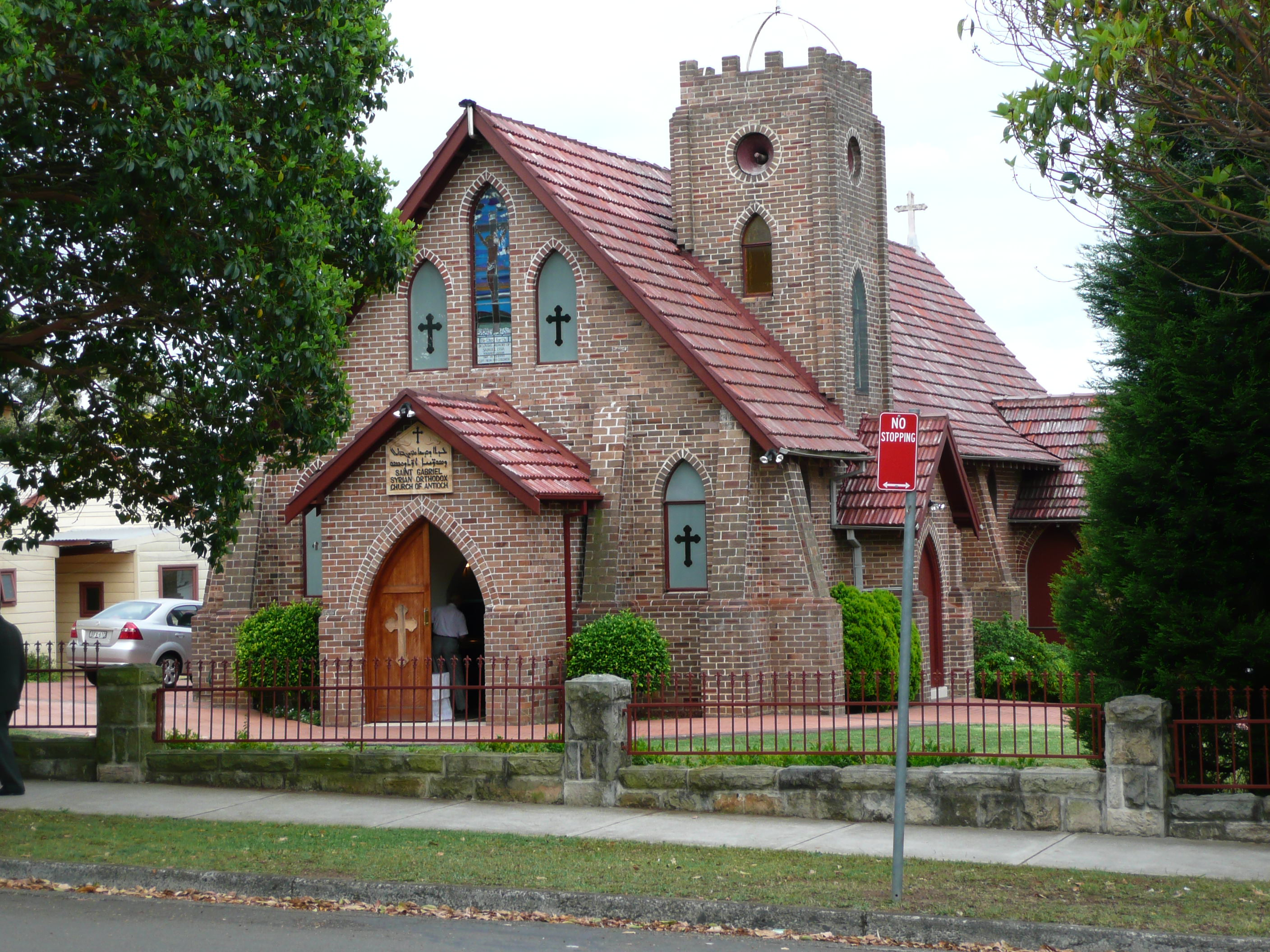
St Gabriel Orthodox Church

=== Churches ===
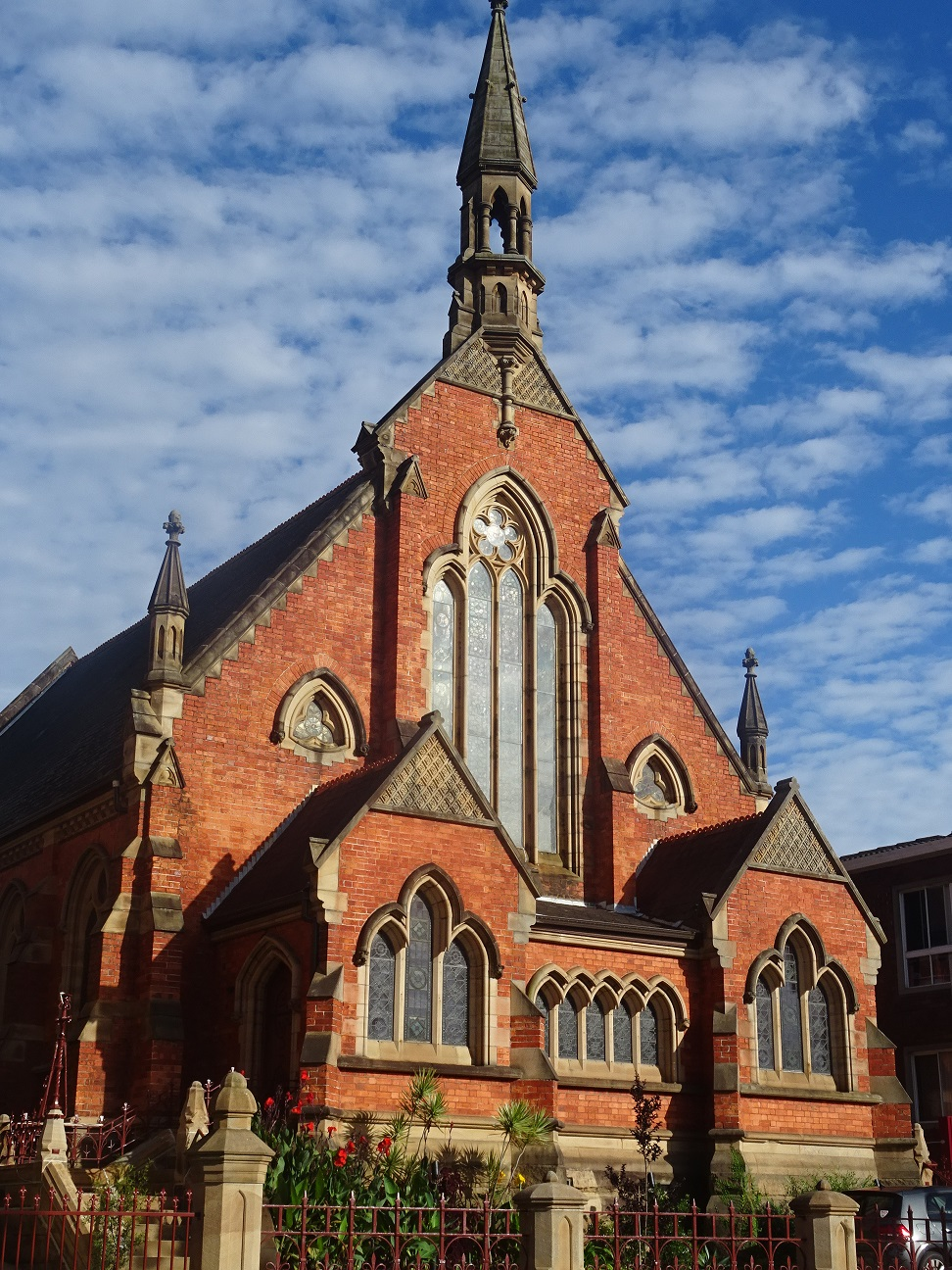
St Christophorus Catholic Church

- All Saints of Russia is a Russian Orthodox Church, Chelmsford Avenue.
- Holy Innocents Catholic Church Webb Street
- Malvern Hill Uniting Church, designed by Alfred Newman.
- St Christophorous is a German-speaking Catholic Church in Edwin Street.
- St Gabriel Syrian Orthodox Church
- St Joseph's Maronite Catholic Church
- St James' Anglican Church Croydon
- Sydney Missionary and Bible College

=== Houses ===
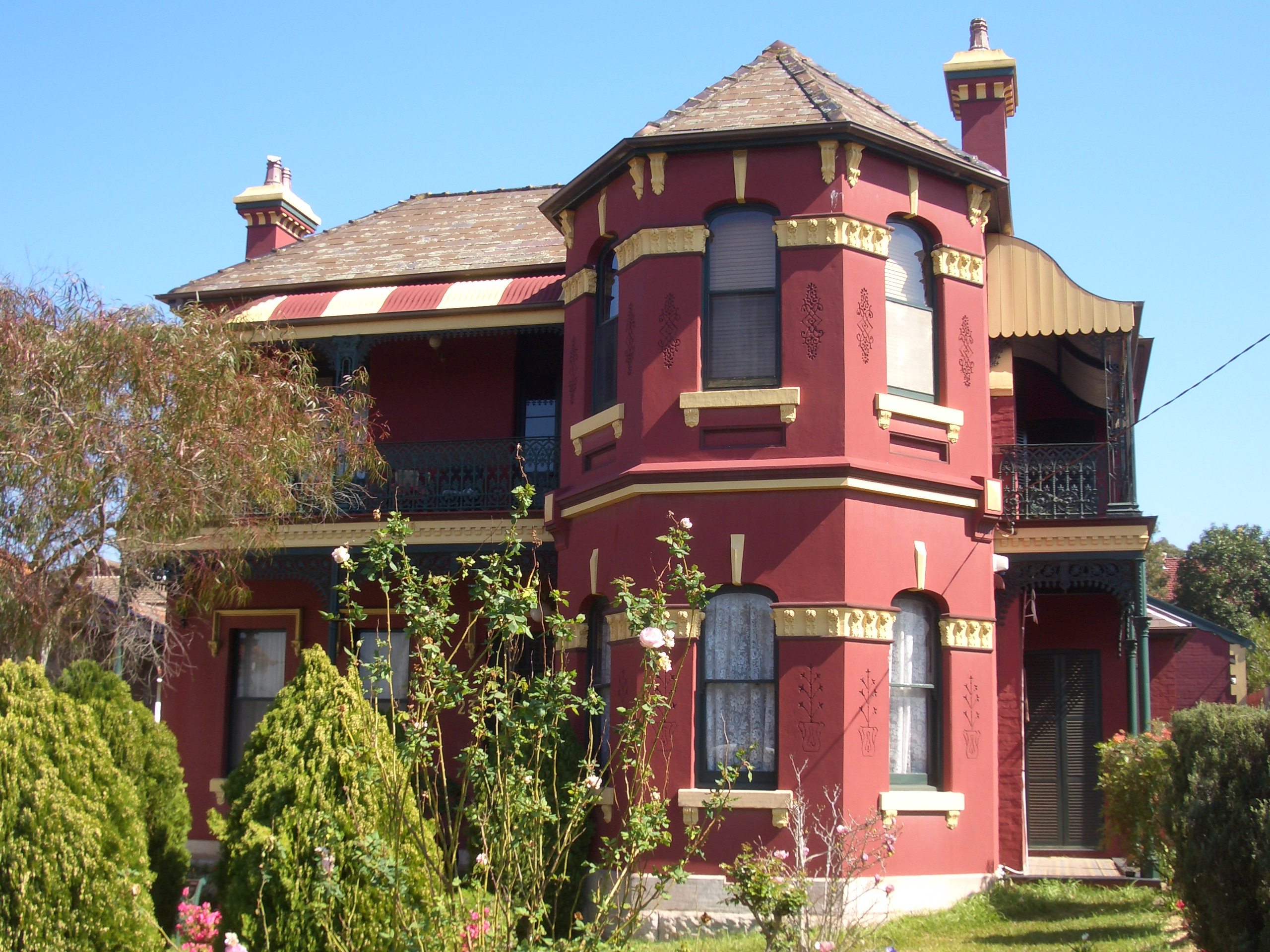
A house on Badminton Road, Croydon.

Croydon features many of the inner west's most sought-after addresses due to its grand homes, larger blocks and family friendly streetscapes. As of 2011, the majority of dwellings were separate houses (63.6%). Croydon is a quiet village-like suburb with mostly detached housing built in the early part of the 20th century in what is known as Federation Bungalow or California Bungalow styles. The suburb caters for first-home buyers, while the wealthy may also find homes in the Malvern Hill Estate, a well-established pocket of prestigious homes that rarely come on the market and sell for more than $900,000. As of January 2016, the median house price of Croydon stood at $1,435,000.

The Malvern Hill area of Croydon was designed as a model suburb in 1906 by surveyors Atchison and Schleiser. Like the nearby Appian Way area in Burwood and the 'garden suburb' Haberfield, the aim of the development was to have modern houses on large blocks of land with wide streets. Most of the houses are California Bungalows or similar Federation-era designs. Just east of Malvern Hill, in the Ashfield Council part of the suburb, is the grand Gads Hill Villa built by former Ashfield mayor Daniel Holborow and the nearby St James Anglican Church.

=== Parks ===
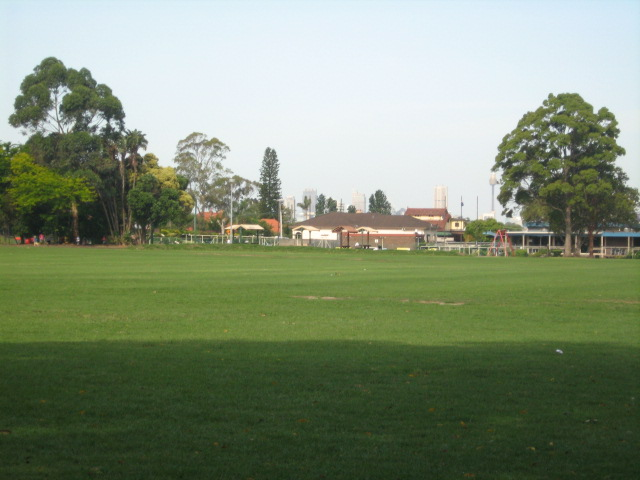
Looking east towards Ashfield from Centenary Park, with the Sydney skyline in the background.

Centenary Park is a large open park with a barbecue area, bike tracks, play equipment, basketball court, two synthetic cricket nets and two playing fields that are used for cricket, rugby and football. Burwood Soccer Club and ACC Cricket Club play some home matches at the park. The Western Suburbs Leagues Bowling Club (Wests Sports) is located next door to the park. Also adjacent is the Bede Spillane Dog Park, situated on the corner of Croydon Road and Queen Street.

The other major sporting park in Croydon is Blair Park, which borders Burwood Girls High School and is situated just 200 metres west of Centenary Park. It contains one sporting field as well as a playground and a dog off-leash area, both adjacent to the sports field.

Wangal Park, situated directly north of Blair Park, is currently undergoing redevelopment by Burwood Council. The area, which was originally a brickpit, will feature three wetlands, boardwalks, educational signage and various amenities. Stage one of construction was opened in 2015, and works are expected to be complete in 2016.

Croydon is also home to various smaller parks and reserves: Reed Reserve, Froggatt Crescent Reserve, Prowse Reserve, Anthony Street Reserve, and Bridges Reserve.

== Population ==
=== Demographics ===
2011 Census Croydon
	Croydon	Sydney	Australia
Population	10,612	4,823,991	25,750,198
Median age	40	36	38
Median weekly household income	$1,846	$1,750	$1,438
Born in Australia	53.8%	57.1%	66.7%

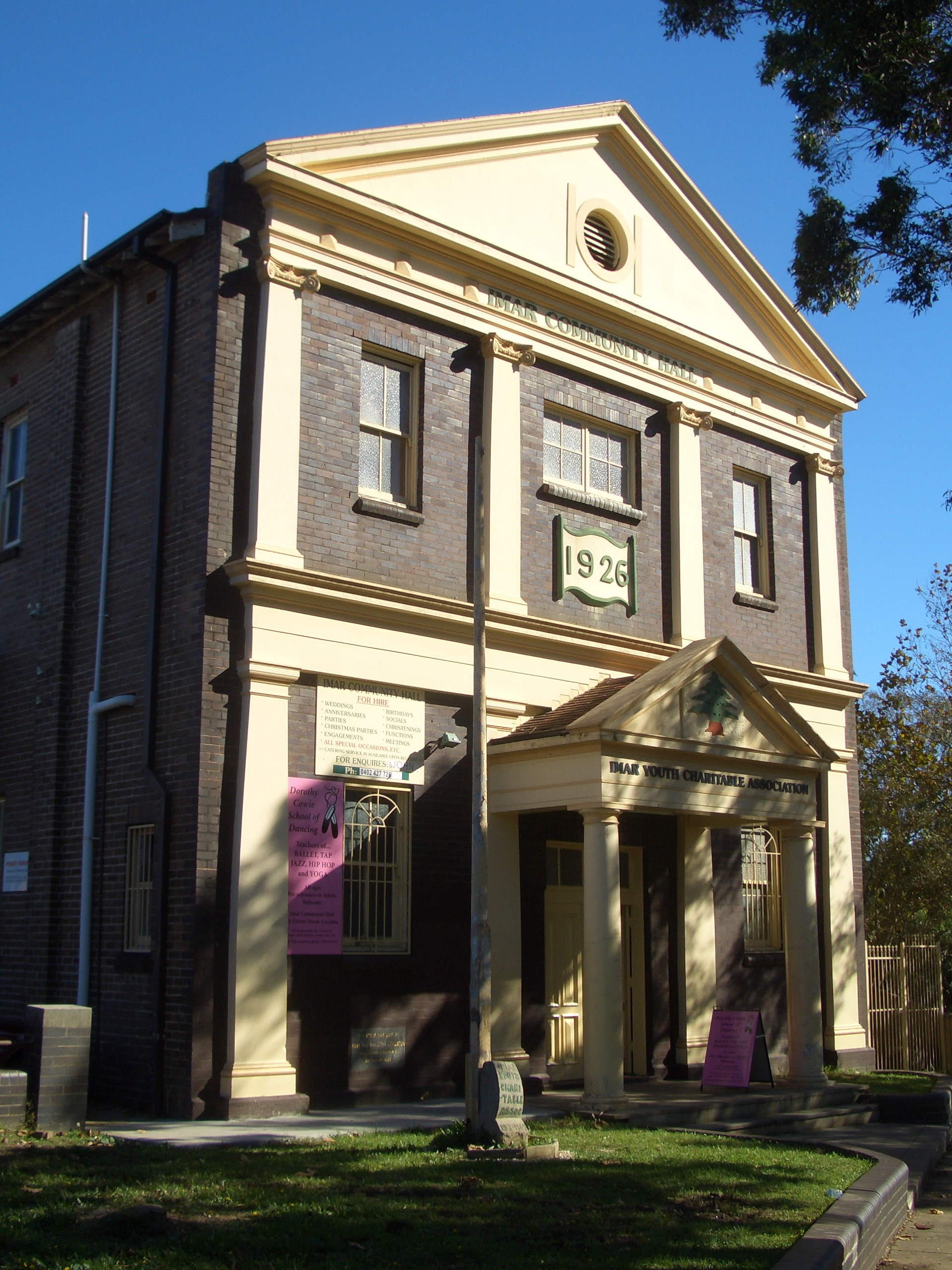
Croydon Community Hall

According to the 2021 census, Croydon had a population of 10,755 people. It did not have the same level of high density housing found in its neighbours Ashfield and Burwood. 55.1% of dwellings were separate houses with 27.0% apartments and 17.2% terraces, semis or townhouses. The median age of people in the suburb was slightly older (42) than the rest of Sydney and a higher percentage of people owned their homes outright (34.7%) than those paying them off (31.4%). Median loan repayments ($2,700 per month) were much higher than the national figure ($1,8635).

Croydon still retains many of the characteristics of the broader Inner West region of Sydney, including a high proportion of residents born overseas. 31.3% of people were born in Australia. The most common other countries of birth were China (excludes SARs and Taiwan) 16.5%, Italy 6.4%, Lebanon 4.3%, and Vietnam 3.4%. The most common ancestries were Chinese 23.2%, Australian 17.5%, English 17.3%, Italian 9.8% and Irish 8.8%. 51.1% of people spoke only English at home. Other languages spoken at home included Mandarin 11.9%, Cantonese 6.0%, Italian 4.7%, Arabic 4.0% and Greek 3.0%. The most common responses for religion were No religion 36.6%, Catholic 28.2%, Anglican 5.9%, Not stated 5.6% and Orthodox 5.0%.

=== Notable residents ===
Notable former and current residents of Croydon include:

- Joseph Abbott (1843–1903) – wool-broker and politician
- Augustus Alt (1731–1815) – first surveyor-general of NSW
- Bert Appleroth (1886–1952) – founder of Aeroplane Jelly
- Francis Birtles (1881–1941) – explorer and author
- Margaret Chandler (1934–1963) – an infamous murder victim
- Eleanor Dark (1901–1985) – one of Australia's most significant novelists was born in Croydon
- Freda Du Faur (1882–1935) – mountaineer
- Michael Fitzpatrick (1816–1881) – public servant, land agent and politician
- Walter Wilson Froggatt (1858–1937) – entomologist, founder of the Naturalists' Society of New South Wales and author
- Anthony Hordern (1819–1876) – shopping magnate, built and lived at Shubra Hall, now part of the Presbyterian Ladies' College, Sydney
- Ern Malley (1918–1943) – a fictitious poet, purportedly lived in Dalmar St, Croydon
- Arthur Murch – an Archibald Prize-winning artist
- Sarah Nelson – first settler in the Burwood Council area
- Sir Bertram Stevens (1889–1973) – Premier of NSW from 1932 to 1939 resided at 15 Malvern Street for around 25 years and during his time as Premier
- Frederick Wills (1870–1955) – artist, photographer and motion picture pioneer

== Politics ==
At the federal level, Croydon is partly in the Division of Reid (north of the Hume Highway) and partly in the Division of Grayndler (south of the Hume Highway). Part of Croydon was moved into Reid at the redistribution in 2016 and the rest into Grayndler at the 2024 redistribution. At the state level, Croydon is in the NSW state electoral division of Strathfield.
