= William Rundell =

Australian philatelist and postal officer (1848–1936)

William Reeve Rundell
- Born: 10 July 1848; Deptford, England
- Died: 6 or 8 March 1936 (aged 87); Sydney, Australia
- Occupation: Post Office official
- Known for: President of the Philatelic Society of Victoria; Signed the Roll of Distinguished Philatelists (1924)
- Children: Ada Rundell

William Reeve Rundell, sometimes Reeves, (10 July 1848 – 6 or 8 March 1936) was an Australian postal officer.

He was born in England but emigrated to Australia with his family while still a child. He obtained employment in the Victorian post office and was promoted to senior posts in Melbourne where he was in charge of post office records. He was also a philatelist, specialising in the stamps of Australia and the State of Victoria. He was a founder member and president of the Philatelic Society of Victoria and a life member of Sydney Philatelic Club. He signed the Roll of Distinguished Philatelists in 1924.

== Early life ==
William Rundell was born in Deptford, London, on 10 July 1848, to William Reeve Rundell, a shipwright, and his wife Sarah Sophia Rundell. In 1855, William senior emigrated to Australia, settling in the Ararat and Ballarat districts, and in 1856, William junior and Sarah joined him. William senior died in 1876 after a successful career as a publican, leaving his wife £2,000 and naming his son as his executor, whom he described as a "Gentleman, Ballarat".

== Personal life ==
William junior married Agnes Manchester (1848–1909) and they had one daughter, the physiotherapist Ada Sophia Rundell (1876–1963). Rundell's homes in Melbourne included Hoddle St, Collingwood (1880–1882), Moorabbin (1888–1893), South Melbourne / Albert Park (1896–1922), and Caulfield (1906).

He was a founding and life member of the Middle Park Bowling Club in Melbourne and a member of the executive body of the choral group the Melbourne Liedertafel.

== Career ==
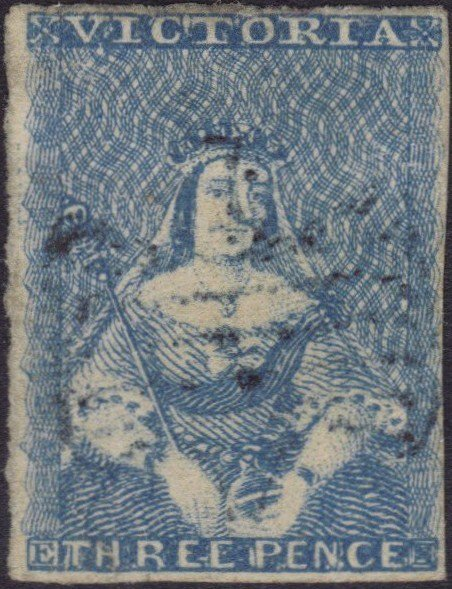
A three pence stamp of the first issue in Victoria, 1850

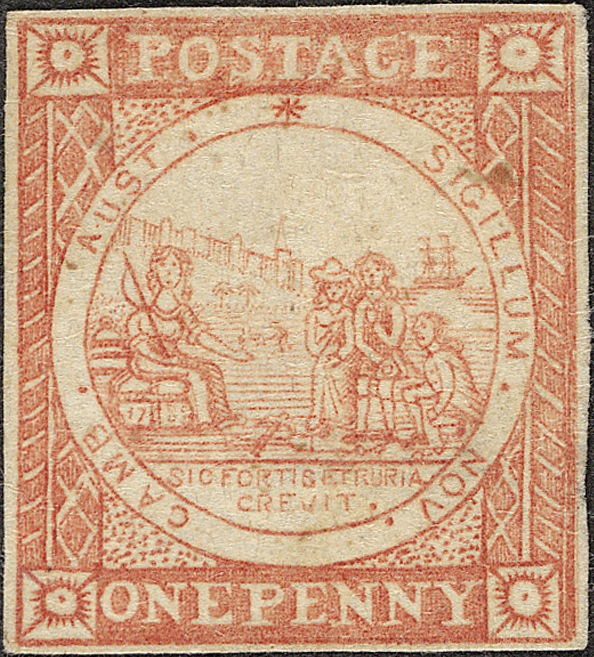
An 1850 "Sydney view" stamp of New South Wales

In 1871, Rundell joined the Victorian Postal Department and in 1878 moved to the Correspondence Branch in Melbourne, subsequently moving to the city and from 1887 managing the branch where he was also responsible for post office records until 1908. He retired in that year, when he may have visited England with his daughter.

Rundell also collected stamps, specialising in the issues of the State of Victoria. He was a founder member and four times president of the Philatelic Society of Victoria and a life member of the Sydney Philatelic Club.

His collection was exhibited in 1900 at a display in Melbourne to celebrate the jubilee of the first stamps of Victoria in 1850. Among the items shown were the one and two penny first issues on cover, the four pence of 1885 printed in the colour of the two pence in error, and three plates (one engraved) of the two pence, Queen on throne. From New South Wales, he showed 48 Sydney view stamps on original covers, the first stamp of that state, including the variety of two pence with "CREVIT" omitted.

In 1914, he was president of the Second Australasian Philatelic Congress, and in December that year was elected a member of the Royal Philatelic Society London. He sold his stamp collection during the First World War. He signed the Roll of Distinguished Philatelists in 1924.

== Death and legacy ==
Rundell died in Sydney on 6 or 8 March 1936, his body being cremated at Lidcombe Crematorium. He had laterly resided at Canterbury, New South Wales. His philatelic research notes were acquired by the Australian philatelist J. R. W. Purves who used them in his own research.

== Selected publications ==
- "Victoria. 4d. in colour of 2d.", Gibbons Stamp Monthly, Vol. 22, No. 253 (January 1914).
- "Were Sydney Views, the First Stamps used in ?", The Australian Philatelist, Vol. 21, No. 11.
- "The Stamps of Victoria", The Australian Philatelic Record, 1925–30.
- "The Six Pence Stamp of Victoria of 1862–65", The London Philatelist, Vol. 41, No. 488 (August 1932).
- "Postage Stamps of Australia", Australian Stamp Journal, April & August 1935.
- "Postage Stamps of Victoria", Australian Stamp Journal, 1935–37.
