= Rundle =

Origin
- Origin: Roundale a place name in Kent
- Region of origin: Kent

Other names
- Variant forms: Rundell, Randell

The Rundle family name is a prominent one in many parts of southwest England, particularly Cornwall.

Notable people with the surname include:

- Adam Rundle, English football player
- David Rundle, South African cricketer
- David Allen Rundle, American serial killer
- Emma Ruth Rundle, American singer-songwriter
- John Rundle, British politician
- Katherine Fernandez Rundle, State Attorney in Florida, United States
- Sir Leslie Rundle (1856–1934), British Army General
- Mary Rundle, British naval officer
- Peter Rundle (born 1962), Australian politician
- Robert E. Rundle, American chemist and crystallographer
- Robert Terrill Rundle, missionary in Western Canada in the mid-1800s
- Sophie Rundle, English actress
- Tony Rundle (1939–2025), premier of Tasmania, Australia (1996–1998)

Originating from the manor at Cobham in Kent which at the time of the Norman invasion was called Roundale or Rundale (the site which is now named Randall Wood). The surname of Rundale, Rundell, Rundle, etc. was originally of 'middling' noble blood, owning a baronage in Cobham, Kent in the twelfth century that lasted for just two generations.

Earliest records indicate that in 1203 the manor was granted to Henry de Cobham. In 1245, John de Cobham acquired the neighbouring manor of Rundale with 50 acres (20 ha). In the 13th century, his son, Henry de Cobham de Rundale inherited Rundale. The line then passed to his son, Stephen de Cobham de Rundele, who becomes first Baron Rundell.

The elder or Kentish line of the Cobhams terminated in an heiress, and she married Sir John Oldcastle, who was summoned to Parliament in right of his wife, as Baron Cobham, in 1409, and who afterwards became famous as the leader of the Lollards.

The Rundle family was then centered in the southwest, where amongst other things - and like many in the area - the family was a prominent member of the seafaring community and owned a large number of taverns until the mid seventeenth century.

The Rundle family today is still largely based in the southeast of England, but also has strong centers in and around the south of London, to where many moved from the southwest and from Wales in the first half of the twentieth century.

== See also ==
- Rundle Burges Watson (1809–1860), British navy captain
- Baron Cobham
- Rundell (disambiguation)
