= Rundle (disambiguation) =

Rundle is an English surname.

Rundle may also refer to:

- Rundle Academy, Calgary, Alberta, Canada
- Rundle, Calgary, a neighbourhood in Calgary, Alberta, Canada
- Rundle (C-Train), a light rail transit station in Calgary, Alberta, Canada
- Mount Rundle, a mountain in Banff National Park, Alberta, Canada
- East End of Rundle, easternmost extension of the Mount Rundle massif
- Rundle Heights, Edmonton, a neighbourhood in Edmonton, Alberta, Canada
- Rundle Park (Edmonton), Alberta, Canada
- Rundle Park, Adelaide, Australia
- Rundle Street, a street in Adelaide, Australia
  - Rundle Mall, a shopping mall in Adelaide, Australia
- Rundle Range National Park, a park in Queensland, Australia
- Runnel Stone, a pinnacle in Cornwall, England

== See also ==
- Rundell (disambiguation)
