= Rundell =

Rundell may refer to:

== People ==
- Ada Sophia Rundell (1876–1936), Australian physiotherapist
- Jock Rundell (1895–1973), Scottish footballer (Motherwell goalkeeper)
- Joel Rundell (1965–1990), American musician
- Katherine Rundell (born 1987), English author
- Maria Rundell (1745–1828), British cookbook author
- Philip Rundell (1746–1827), English jeweller
- Walter Rundell Jr., American author and historian
- William Rundell (1848–1936), Australian philatelist
- Rundell Winchester (born 1993), Trinidadian footballer

== Other uses ==
- Rundell and Bridge, London jewellery company

== See also ==
- Randall (disambiguation)
- Rundle (disambiguation)
