= Gowings =

Department store chain in Australia

- Industry: Retail
- Founded: 1868; 158 years ago
- Founder: John Gowing
- Defunct: 2005; 21 years ago
- Area served: Sydney, New South Wales, Australia
- Products: Menswear

Gowings was a department store chain in Sydney, New South Wales, Australia, established in 1868. Set on several floors, it specialised in men's casual clothing, camping gear and novelty items. It had a men's barber and a dining restaurant.

== Company history ==
In 1863, John Gowing opened a drapery business in Crown Street, East Sydney, New South Wales. He entered into partnership on 4 November 1868 with his brother Preston Robert Gowing, who had been working as a storekeeper in Victoria. They set up the Mercery and Glove Depot, at 318 George Street, which John managed for £200 per annum plus half the profits of the business. This store was located on the corner of Market Street and George Street and the site was redeveloped in 1929 by John's son, Preston Lanchester Gowing, both as an investment and prime retail location. It became one of the most prominent and famous department stores in Sydney. In recent years Gowings embarked on an ambitious expansion plan, opening four more Gowings stores in other locations in Sydney.

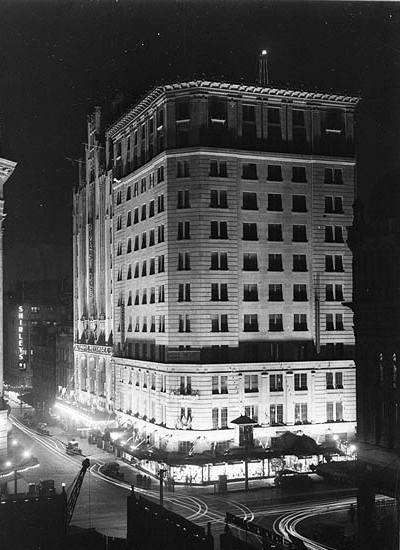
Gowings department store, Sydney, in the 1930s

In 2001, Gowings divested the stores to an independent listed company, Gowings Retail (later G Retail), to enable them to concentrate on their investment and property interests. Although successful in the city, their locations in suburban areas failed to attract customers.

== Acquisition ==
In November 2005, after three years of successive losses, G Retail Ltd entered administration. Attempts to sell the business were unsuccessful and the last remaining Gowings store was the one in George Street, Sydney, which closed its doors at 5:23pm on 29 January 2006. The building was then taken over by Supré. After five years, the building opened its doors to the public as Sydney's first ever Topshop store in 2011.

== In popular culture ==
The department store was featured in Mighty Morphin Power Rangers: The Movie.

The origin of the now old-fashioned Australian colloquial phrase, 'gone to Gowings', is associated with the store.

== Gallery ==
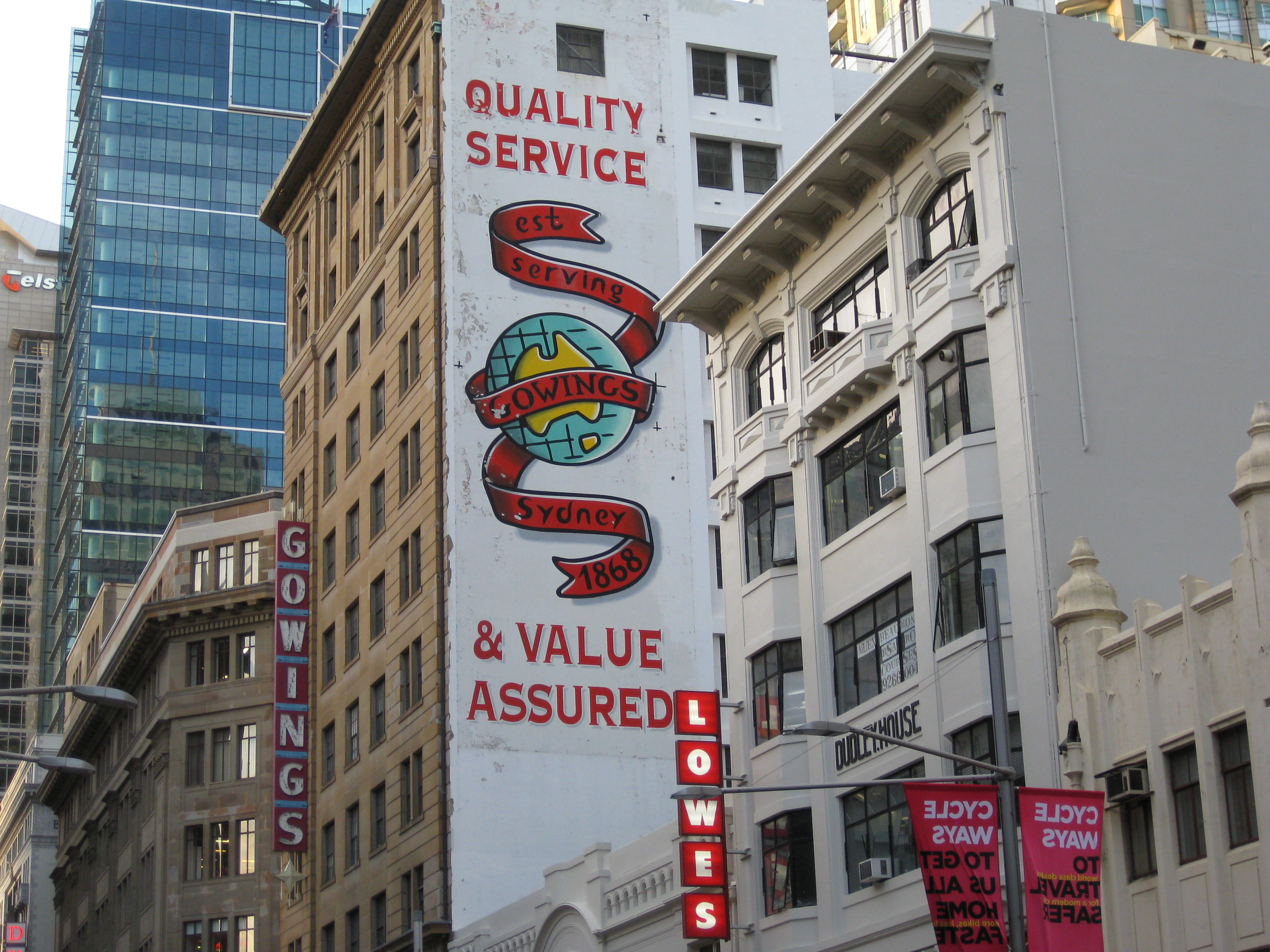
Gowings signage on George Street, 2010

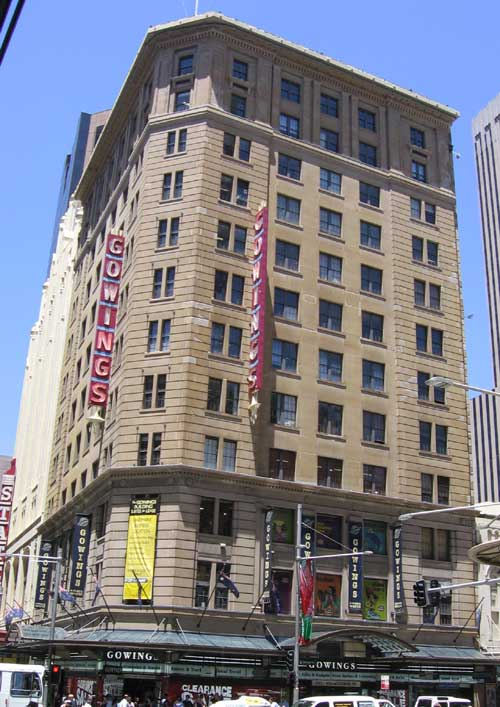
Gowings department store in 2005

== See also ==
- Anthony Hordern & Sons
- Marcus Clark & Co.
- Mark Foy's
- Waltons
