= J. R. W. Purves =

Australian lawyer and philatelist (1903–1979)

James R.W. Purves
- Born: 5 March 1903
- Died: 13 May 1979 (aged 76)
- Engineering career
- Projects: researcher, expert of Australian stamps, and author of philatelic literature of the Australian region
- Awards: Crawford Medal; APS Hall of Fame; Lichtenstein Medal; J. R.W. Purves Medal

James Richard William Purves (5 March 1903 – 13 May 1979) – generally denoted in publications as J. R. W. Purves -- was an Australian lawyer and philatelist. His half century of work in Australian philately earned him the title "The personification of Australia in International Philately".

== Philatelic literature ==
Purves authored philatelic literature based on his detailed studies of postage stamps. These included numerous books and articles:

- Art and the postage stamp : the present Australian outlook
- The Half Lengths of Victoria (1953)
- North-West Pacific Islands : The Nature And Make-Up of the Different Overprinting Formes (1953)
- South Australia - The Long Stamps of 1902–1912 (1978)
- Victoria: the Postage Dues
- Numerous articles on aspects of the stamps and postal history of Victoria

== Collecting interests ==
The most significant of Purves' collections of postage material included collections of philatelic material on:

- Tasmania
- Fiji
- Half Lengths of Victoria

== Philatelic activity ==
Purves was active in all fields of Australian philatelic interest. He helped establish the Royal Philatelic Society of Victoria in 1957. For his work with the society, and because of his extensive work in Australian philately, the society established the J.R.W. Purves Medal in 1970 is his honor and named him as the first recipient.

== Honors and awards ==
For his work in the field of philately, Purves was provided numerous awards and honors, including:

- signed the Roll of Distinguished Philatelists in 1937
- The Crawford Medal in 1954
- The Lichtenstein Medal in 1960
- The J. R.W. Purves Medal in 1970
- Entered in the American Philatelic Society Hall of Fame in 1980.
- Honorary Life Member of the Collectors Club of New York
- Honorary Life Fellow of the Royal Philatelic Society London in 1969
- Honorary Life Fellow of the Royal Philatelic Society of Victoria

== See also ==
- Philately
- Philatelic literature
- Lichtenstein Medal
- Crawford Medal

== References and sources ==
Sources

- The Collectors Club of New York, Lichtenstein Award Winners
- Library catalog
- American Philatelic Society
- Australian Directory of Biography
