= John Gowing =

Australian businessman

- Born: John Ellis Symonds Gowing; 1835; Eye, Suffolk, England
- Died: 2 October 1908 (aged 72–73)
- Burial place: Rookwood Cemetery
- Occupations: Retailer, entrepreneur
- Organisation(s): Royal Arch Masonic Lodge, Petersham
- Known for: Gowings

John Ellis Symonds Gowing (1835-2 October 1908) was an English-born Australian retailer and draper, who founded the eponymous men's department store Gowings. Originally, the company specialised in ladies gloves and silk umbrellas.

== Early years and career ==
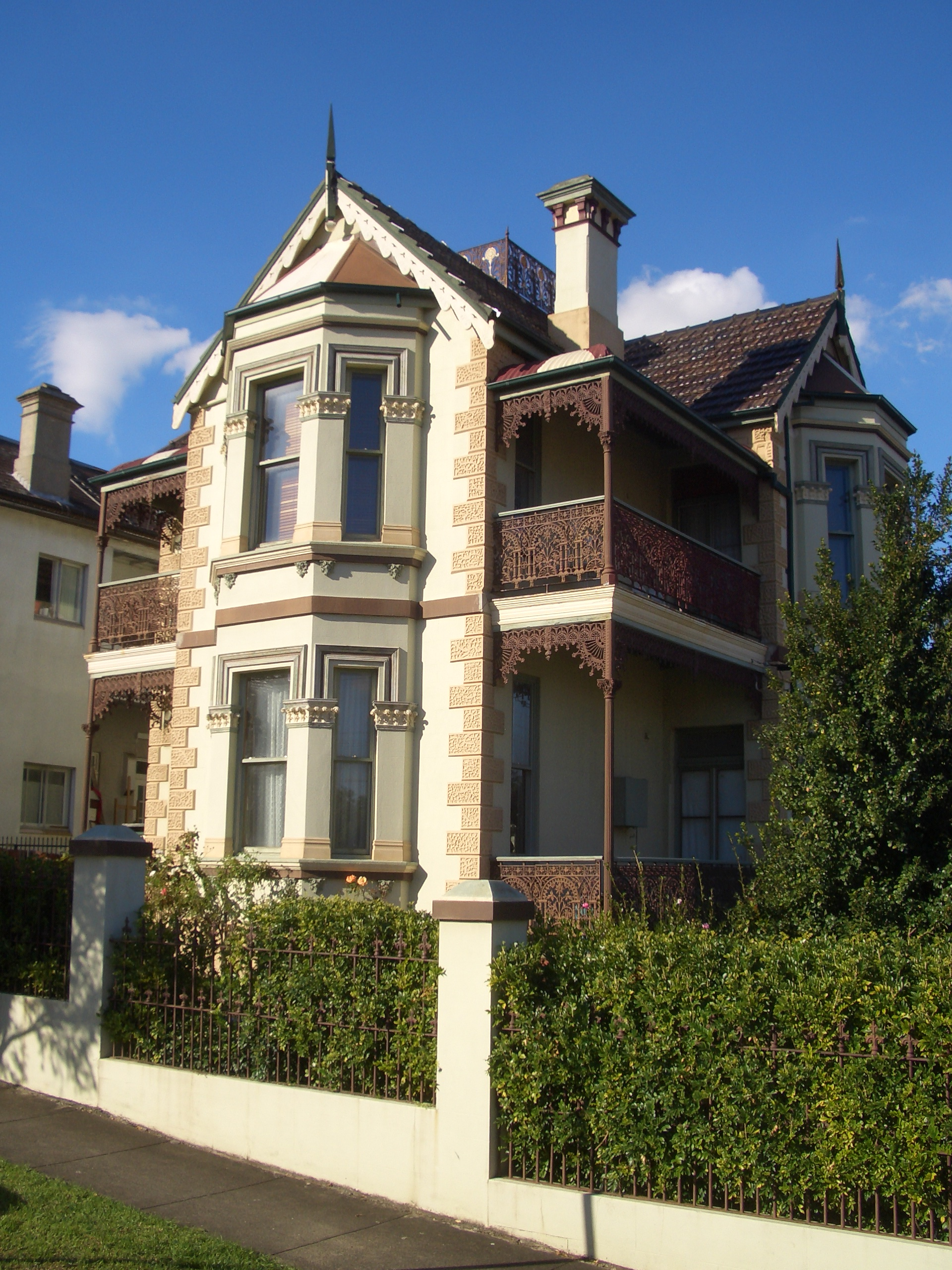
John Gowing's home Lyndhurst, Middleton Street, and Stanmore

Gowing was born at Cranley Hall, Eye, Suffolk, England, and was the eldest son of 10 children of Ellis Symonds Gowing, a farmer, and his wife Charlotte Lancaster. At 24 years of age, Gowing emigrated to Sydney with £400 on the American ship, the Commonwealth. A year later, his parents and siblings followed him to Australia.

On arrival in Sydney, Gowing worked on the harbour in a maritime warehouse. Soon after, he commenced working in retail with David Jones. He rose to be in charge of the mercery department and lived above the store, as was common in the era.

Gowing opened a drapery business on Crown Street, East Sydney, in 1863. Five years later, he and his younger brother, Preston Robert Gowing (1839–1900), opened the Mercery and Glove Depot in George Street, Sydney. John Gowing managed the store for £200 per year and a half share of the profits. The business prospered, and in 1864, a mercery warehouse, Edinburgh House, was opened. In 1878, his brother left employment as manager of another outfitter and joined Gowings. In time, ladies' gloves and silk umbrellas became less important, and Gowings became known as a high-class gentleman's outfitter. Preston Gowing predeceased his brother, and in 1907, John Gowing transferred the business to his nephew and elder sons. John Gowing's son, Preston Gowing, became chairman and ushered in a new era for the department store.

== Death ==
In 1908, Gowing died at his home, Lyndhurst, Middleton Street, Stanmore. He was survived by his wife, Elizabeth, who had been a milliner in her native Cambridgeshire, and eight children. His funeral service was held at All Saints' Anglican Church, Petersham, before his masonic burial at Rookwood. Gowing was a prominent mason and a founder of the Royal Arch Masonic Lodge, Petersham.
