= Rundle Burges Watson =

British Royal Navy captain

Captain Rundle Burges Watson
- Born: 1809
- Died: 5 July 1860 (aged 50–51)
- Occupation: Royal Navy captain

Rundle Burges Watson (1809 – 5 July 1860) was a British Royal Navy captain.

== Biography ==
Watson eldest son of Captain Joshua Rowley Watson (1772–1810), was born in 1809. He entered the navy in November 1821, and was promoted to the rank of lieutenant on 7 October 1829. He afterwards served on the coast of Portugal and on the North American station, till in November 1837 he was appointed to the Calliope frigate, with Captain Thomas Herbert. After two years on the coast of Brazil the Calliope was sent to China, where she was actively employed during the first Chinese war. On 6 May 1841 Watson was promoted to the rank of commander, and was moved with Herbert to the Blenheim; and while in her was repeatedly engaged with the enemy, either in command of boats or landing parties. On 23 December 1842 he was advanced to post rank, and the next day, 24 December, was nominated a C.B. From February 1846 to October 1849 he commanded the Brilliant, a small frigate, on the Cape of Good Hope station; and in December 1852 was appointed to the Impérieuse, a new 50-gun steam frigate, then, and for some years later, considered one of the finest ships in the navy. In 1854 she was sent up the Baltic in advance of the fleet, Watson being senior officer of the squadron of small vessels appointed to watch the breaking up of the ice, and to see that no Russian ships of war got to sea. It was an arduous service well performed. The Impérieuse continued with the flying squadron in the Baltic during the campaigns of 1854 and 1855. After the peace she was sent to the North American station, and returned to England and was paid off early in 1857. In June 1859 Watson was appointed captain-superintendent of Sheerness dockyard, where he died on 5 July 1860. He was married and left issue; his son, Captain Burges Watson, R.N., is now (1899) superintendent of Pembroke Dockyard.
