= Ada Rundell =

Australian physiotherapist

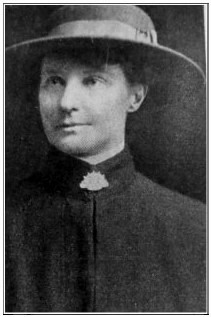
- Ada Rundell in uniform
- Born: Ada Sophia Rundell; 1 January 1876; Ballarat, Australia
- Died: 1936 (aged 60); Brisbane
- Known for: Promoting physiotherapy in the Australian army
- Relatives: William Rundell (father)
- Medical career
- Profession: Physiotherapist

Ada Sophia Rundell (1 January 1876 - 1936), was an Australian physiotherapist who before the First World War promoted the use of physiotherapy by the military, and who subsequently served with the Australian Imperial Force in France and England during the conflict.

== Early life and education ==
Ada Sophia Rundell was born on 1 January 1876 in Ballarat, Victoria, Australia, to William Reeve Rundell and his wife Agnes.

== Career ==
She gained the Australasian Massage Association's qualification.

== Personal and family ==
In 1921 she married a soldier 12 years elder to her and who was suffering from tuberculosis. He died two years later.

== Death ==
Rundell died in Wynnum, a suburb of Brisbane, in 1963. Her life was selected to be part of the East Melbourne Historical Society's Great War project.
