= Rookwood Cemetery =

Victorian-era burial ground in Sydney, Australia

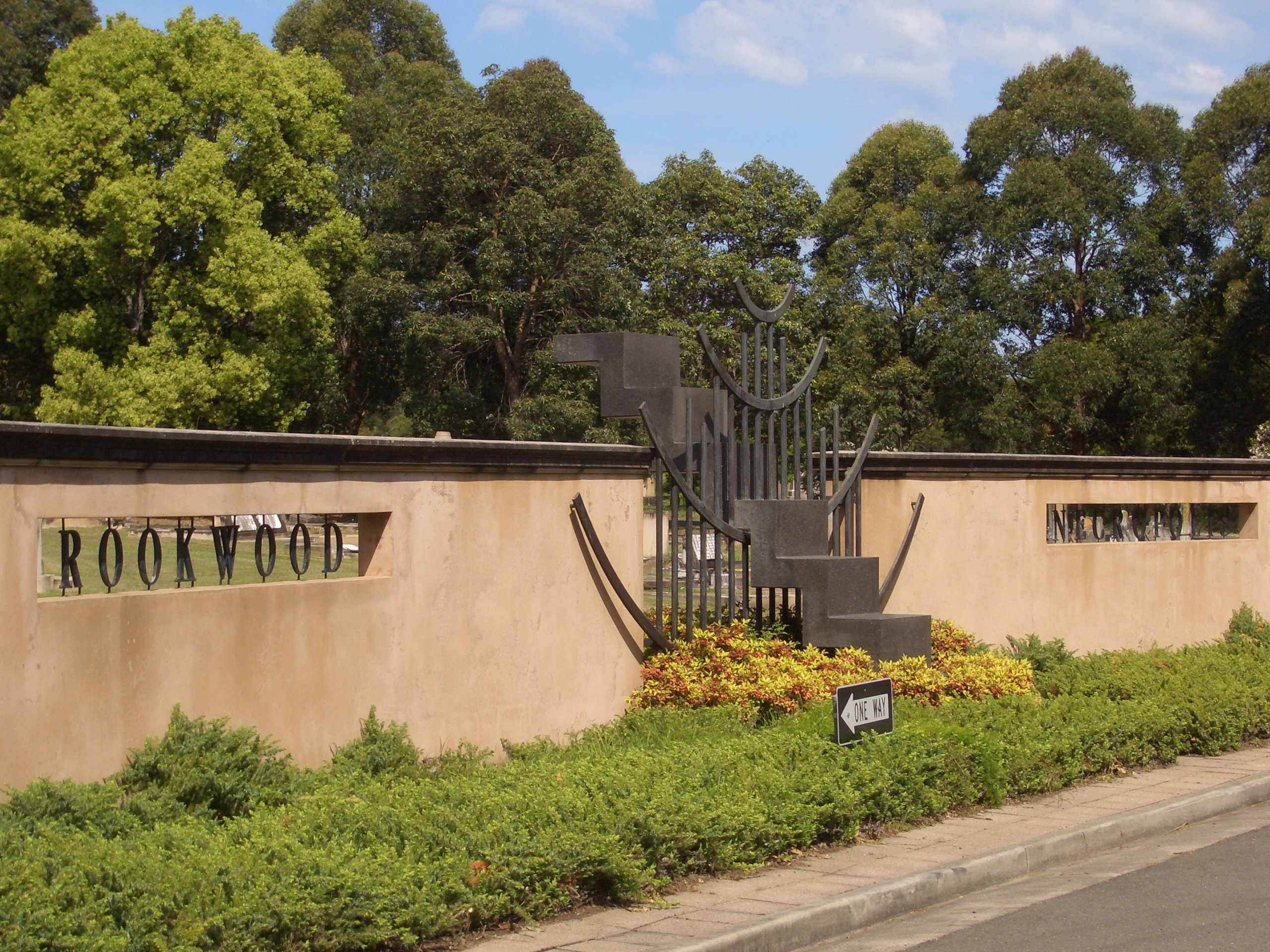
- Rookwood Necropolis entrance
- Interactive map of Rookwood Cemetery

Details
- Established: 1868
- Location: Sydney
- Country: Australia
- Coordinates: 33°52′27″S 151°03′17″E
- Type: Public
- Size: 286 hectares
- No. of interments: 1 million
- Website: www.rookwoodcemetery.com.au

New South Wales Heritage Register
- Official name: Rookwood Cemetery and Necropolis
- Type: State heritage (Landscape)
- Designated: 2 April 1999
- Reference no.: 718
- Type: Cemetery/Graveyard/Burial Ground
- Category: Cemeteries and Burial Sites

Celtic cross, Rookwood

Rookwood Cemetery (officially named Rookwood Necropolis) is a heritage-listed cemetery in Rookwood, Sydney, Australia. It is the largest necropolis in the Southern Hemisphere and is the world's largest remaining operating cemetery from the Victorian era. It is close to Lidcombe railway station about 17 kilometres (11 mi) west of the Sydney central business district. It was added to the New South Wales State Heritage Register on 2 April 1999.

== Description ==
Rookwood Cemetery is divided into denominational and operational areas with individual offices, staff, and equipment to run different parts of the entire area. The cemetery is now managed by three trusts. Rookwood Necropolis Land Manager are the custodians of Rookwood on behalf of the NSW Government. The two denominational trusts are responsible for the care and maintenance of a number of burial sections catering to various ethnic and cultural groups within the community. Those trusts are: Rookwood General Cemeteries Reserve Land Manager (Rookwood General Cemetery) and the Catholic Cemeteries and Crematoria. The NSW Cremation Company, which founded and operates The Rookwood Memorial Gardens Crematorium, is the oldest operating crematorium in Australia. The NSW Cremation Company is the only private company operating a 'cemetery' section within the Necropolis grounds. Today the company is part of the InvoCare company.

Rookwood also contains a number of memorial shrines including those dedicated to victims of The Holocaust and to members of the merchant marines killed in wartime. The Sydney War Cemetery is located in the eastern section of the Necropolis. The Circle of Love is a shrine dedicated to stillborn children or those who died in young infancy.

There are 915,000 people (figures as at 31 December 2014) that have been buried and cremated at Rookwood, which covers an area of 314 hectares (780 acres). The "Friends of Rookwood Inc" is a voluntary organisation dedicated to preserving the site. As the largest Victorian era cemetery still in operation in the world, Rookwood is of significant national and historical importance.

Some older sections of Rookwood are overgrown, some early horticultural plants, many now large trees or groves, as well as an array of remnant indigenous flora. This results in a mix of flora to be found within the necropolis, including endangered native species such as Downy wattle and small leaved Dillwynia (Dillwynia parvifolia).

The Serpentine Canal within the Rookwood General Cemeteries Reserve Land Manager was restored in recent years, repairing and replacing ornamentation, landscaping and vegetation over 31 hectares (77 acres) of the cemetery.

== History ==
In 1819, Governor Lachlan Macquarie established Sydney's main burial ground near the town's brickworks. By the 1840s, the Devonshire Street Cemetery was close to being full so another larger site was needed. A location on the Sydney Common was chosen in 1845, but abandoned in 1859 without ever being used due to complaints from local residents and churches. In Australia, as in Europe, there was an increasing trend to move burial sites outside of the cities for practical, hygienic and other more aesthetic purposes. With a railway line having been completed to Parramatta in 1856, it was decided to locate the new cemetery at a point on the line. Several sites were surveyed and found to be inappropriate. However, in 1862 the Cowper government purchased 80 hectares of land at Haslem's Creek from the estate of Edward Cohen. Cohen's land had previously formed part of a larger parcel known as "Hyde Park" that had been given to the magistrate and parliamentarian Henry Grattan Douglass in 1833 and subsequently leased out. The site was approved due to its relative isolation and proximity to the railway line.

The cemetery was then divided into sections for the various denominations according to their numbers in the 1861 census. The Church of England section was 21 hectares, the Catholic Church was allocated 14 hectares and a non-denominational area of 23 hectares was also established. Other denominations allocated land in the original 200 acres (80 hectares) were Jews, Independents (Congregationalists), Presbyterians and Wesleyans. The Necropolis Act of 1867 came into force on 1 January 1868 formally dedicating the cemetery and establishing cemetery trusts. The first burial in the cemetery, reported by the Sydney Morning Herald, was a pauper, 18-year-old John Whalan, buried on 5 January 1867. This burial was not recorded in the burial register. The first official burial was recorded in the Roman Catholic area: a 14-month-old toddler, Catherine McMullen, on 7 January 1867.

By 1879, more land was needed and the remaining 233 hectares of the former "Hyde Park" were then purchased. By the 1890s the cemetery was home to several buildings including the St Michael the Archangel Chapel and various cottages for section managers and sextons.

The cemetery was originally known simply as the Necropolis (Koine Greek meaning "city of the dead"), but local residents lobbied officials to have the name of their village changed from Haslem's Creek due to its association with the cemetery. In 1879, the villagers got their wish and the area's name was changed to Rookwood; however, before long, the Necropolis was also being referred to by that name. The settlement of Rookwood changed its name in 1913 to Lidcombe, as a blend of two mayors' names, Lidbury and Larcombe (Larcombe was also a monumental stonemason whose business, 'Larcombe Memorials' exists to this day). The cemetery retained the name Rookwood.

The name Rookwood is most likely an accidental or deliberate corruption of the name Brookwood Cemetery and its associated railway station. At the time of Rookwood's opening, Brookwood Cemetery, located in Brookwood, Surrey, England, was one of the largest cemeteries in the world. It is less likely that, as claimed by some sources, Rookwood was named after William Harrison Ainsworth's novel Rookwood, written in 1834.

== Railway line ==
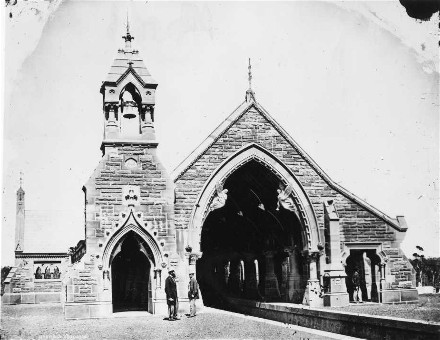
Haslem's Creek Cemetery station c.1865

Rookwood was served by a rail spur from the main line from 1867 until 1948. Mortuary stations served each of the three sections of the necropolis, with a fourth at the main junction and a fifth on Regent Street adjacent to Central station. The railway line construction began in November 1864 and from 1 January 1865, trains began their run into the cemetery. It stopped at prearranged stations on the journey from central Sydney to pick up mourners and coffins. Trains ran at 9.30 am and 3 pm. The trains that carried the mourners were known as 'unimproved Redferns' There were two types of Hearse carriages used for the procession. One consisted of a four-wheeled van that carried up to 10 coffins on its upper and lower shelves. Each of these shelves was designed so it could open onto the platform. There were also eight-wheeled vans that could hold 30 coffins. Both of these vehicles were attached the back of the train for transporting to the cemetery. At the terminus inside the cemetery the coffins were unloaded using 'wheeled hand-propelled litters' The rail line was used to convey funeral parties to Rookwood until 1948 when the expanded use of processions by road made it obsolete. The stations were offered to the Joint Committee of Necropolis Trustees for the price of £1 but due to maintenance costs the offer was rejected and the platforms within the cemetery were demolished. Cemetery Station No. 1 at the head of the rail spur was sold to Reverend Buckle for £100 in 1951 and was moved to Canberra in 1957 to become the All Saints Church, Canberra.

== Cultural references ==
Rookwood Cemetery gave rise to the phrase "crook as Rookwood", meaning chronically ill, as "crook" is Australian slang for being unwell. A novel by Chris Nyst published in 2005 uses the phrase as its title.

== Notable interments ==
Rookwood Cemetery has or had several notable interments, including three recipients of the Victoria Cross.

- Eric Bailey (1906–1945), recipient of the George Cross
- Barcroft Boake (1866–1892), poet
- James Barnet (1827–1904), NSW Government Architect
- Aaron Buzacott (1800–1864), Congregational minister, missionary at Rarotonga and founder of Takamoa Theological College; reinterred from Devonshire Street Cemetery
- Joseph Cahill (1891–1959), Premier of New South Wales
- The Clarke brothers, Thomas (1840–1867) and John (1846–1867), bushrangers
- Francis Lyon Cohen (1862–1934), the first Jewish chaplain in the British Army
- Peter Dawson (1882–1961), bass-baritone singer
- John Fairfax (1804–1877), newspaper proprietor
- Eugene Falleni (1875–1938), murderer
- Lilian Fowler (1886–1954), Australia's first female mayor
- John Frazer (1827–1884), politician and businessman
- Albert Henry Fullwood (1863–1930), painter
- Jimmy Governor (1875–1901), outlaw
- John Gowing (1835–1908), co-founder of Gowings store
- William Ewart Hart (1885–1943), aviator
- John 'Chow' Hayes (1911–1993), Underworld Figure (cremated)
- Mary Healy (Mother Gertrude) (1865–1952), Sister of Charity and hospital administrator
- John 'Barney' Hines (1878–1958), veteran WWI soldier, known for prowess as 'souvenir' collector from Germans
- Les Holden (1895-1932), World War I Australian fighter ace (cremated)
- Livingston Hopkins (1846–1947), illustrator & cartoonist, professionally known as 'Hop' (cremated)
- Charles Hoskins (1851–1926), industrialist associated with the iron and steel industry
- Sallie-Anne Huckstep (1954–1986), Sydney underworld figure
- David Jones (1793–1873), founder of David Jones department stores
- Samuel Joseph (1824–1898), merchant, politician, Jewish community leader
- Peter Kenna (1930–1987), playwright
- Jack Lang (1876–1975), Premier of New South Wales
- Louisa Lawson (1848–1920), suffragist
- Charles Frederick Maynard (1897–1946), Indigenous leader
- Peter Dodds McCormick (1834–1916), songwriter ("Advance Australia Fair")
- George McRae (1858–1923), architect
- Bea Miles (1902–1973), well-known Sydney eccentric
- Bob Nichols (1809–1857), politician, first Auditor-General of NSW
- Yip Ho Nung (1909–1979), restaurateur and Chinese community leader
- Sergeant John Paton (1833–1914), recipient of the Victoria Cross, awarded in Indian Mutiny
- Jacob Pitman (1810–1890), advocate of shorthand (whose epitaph is written phonetically)
- Roy Rene (1891–1954), comedian
- Abe Saffron (1919–2006), businessman and underworld figure
- Andrew George Scott (1842–1880), bushranger (disinterred 1995; reinterred in North Gundagai Anglican cemetery)
- Rose Scott (1847–1925), feminist
- Achille Simonetti (1838–1890), sculptor
- Kenneth Slessor (1901–1971), poet (cremated)
- Captain Richard Been Stannard (1902–1977), Royal Naval Reserve, recipient of the Victoria Cross, awarded in Norway campaign, World War II (cremated)
- Mei Quong Tart (1850–1903), Sydney merchant and restaurateur
- James Toohey (1850–1895), brewer
- Sergeant John Woods Whittle (1882–1946), recipient of the Victoria Cross, awarded in World War I.

== War graves ==
As at June 2025, Rookwood Necropolis contains the graves of a total 711 Commonwealth service personnel that are registered by the Commonwealth War Graves Commission, 435 from World War I and 274 from World War II, besides three Dutch war graves. The commission also erected a memorial to 132 Commonwealth service personnel of World War II who were cremated at Rookwood Crematorium and whose ashes remain here.

=== Sydney War Cemetery ===
Within the grounds of Rookwood Cemetery is enclosed the CWGC's Sydney War Cemetery, whose entrance is on the west side on the necropolis railway. It was established in 1942 during World War II for service personnel and there are now 732 buried or commemorated by name here. Most of those buried here died at the Concord Military Hospital in Sydney. The British war graves within the cemetery are of servicemen who died as prisoners of war in Japanese hands and had been cremated; after the war, their ashes were brought to Sydney and buried here. Here is also buried a civilian employee of the Admiralty and there is one French war grave.

Within the entrance building is the New South Wales Cremation Memorial, which commemorates 199 service personnel of World War II who were cremated within the state of New South Wales and whose ashes were subsequently scattered or buried at places where commemoration by a CWGC memorial was not possible.

Within the cemetery stands the Sydney Memorial to almost 750 personnel of the Australian Army, Royal Australian Air Force and Australian Merchant Navy who died in World War II in the eastern and southern regions of Australia and waters south of 20 degrees Latitude who have no known grave.

== Chapels ==
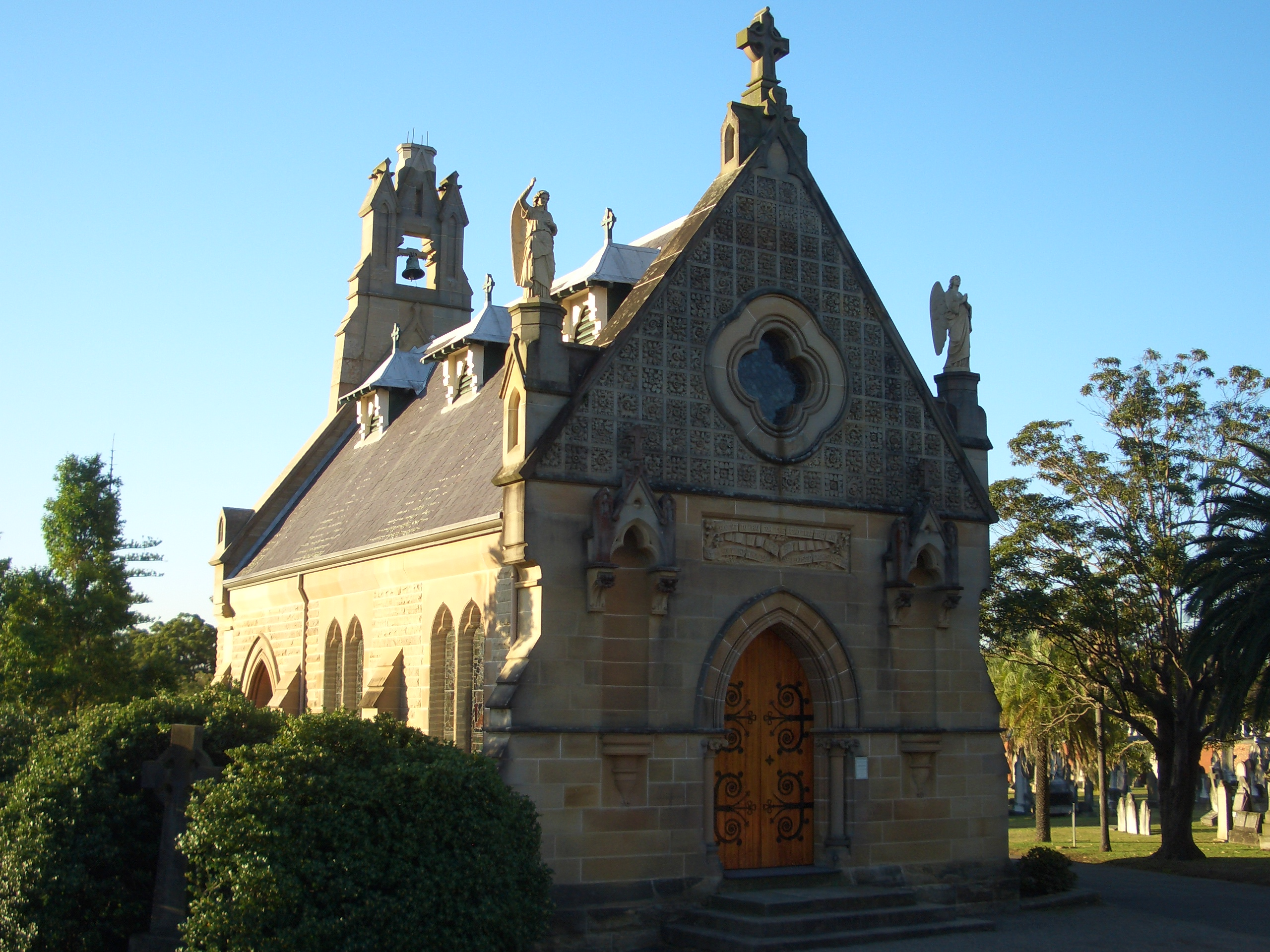
St Michael the Archangel Catholic Chapel

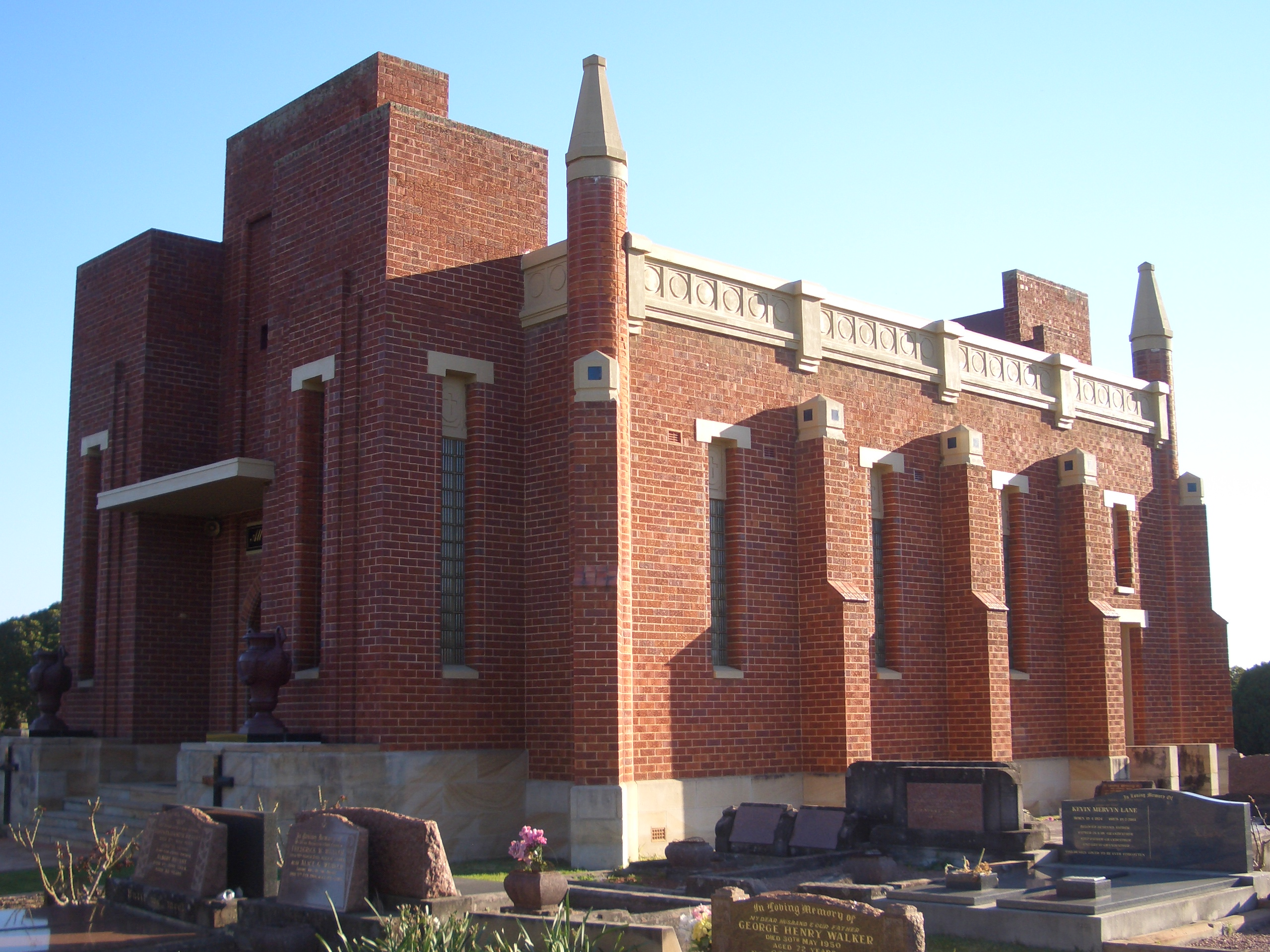
Anglican "All Souls" Chapel

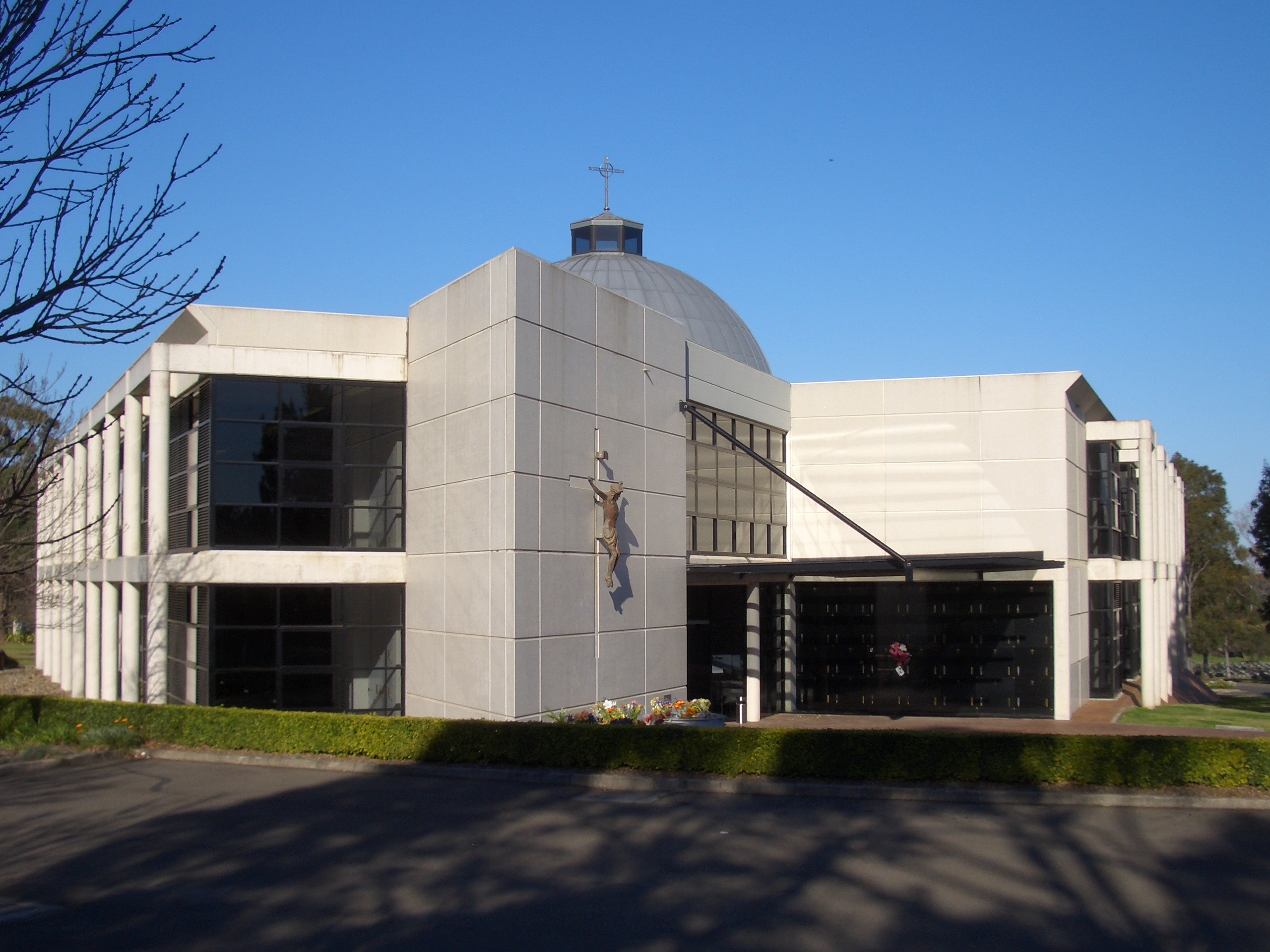
Mausoleum of the Resurrection Catholic Chapel

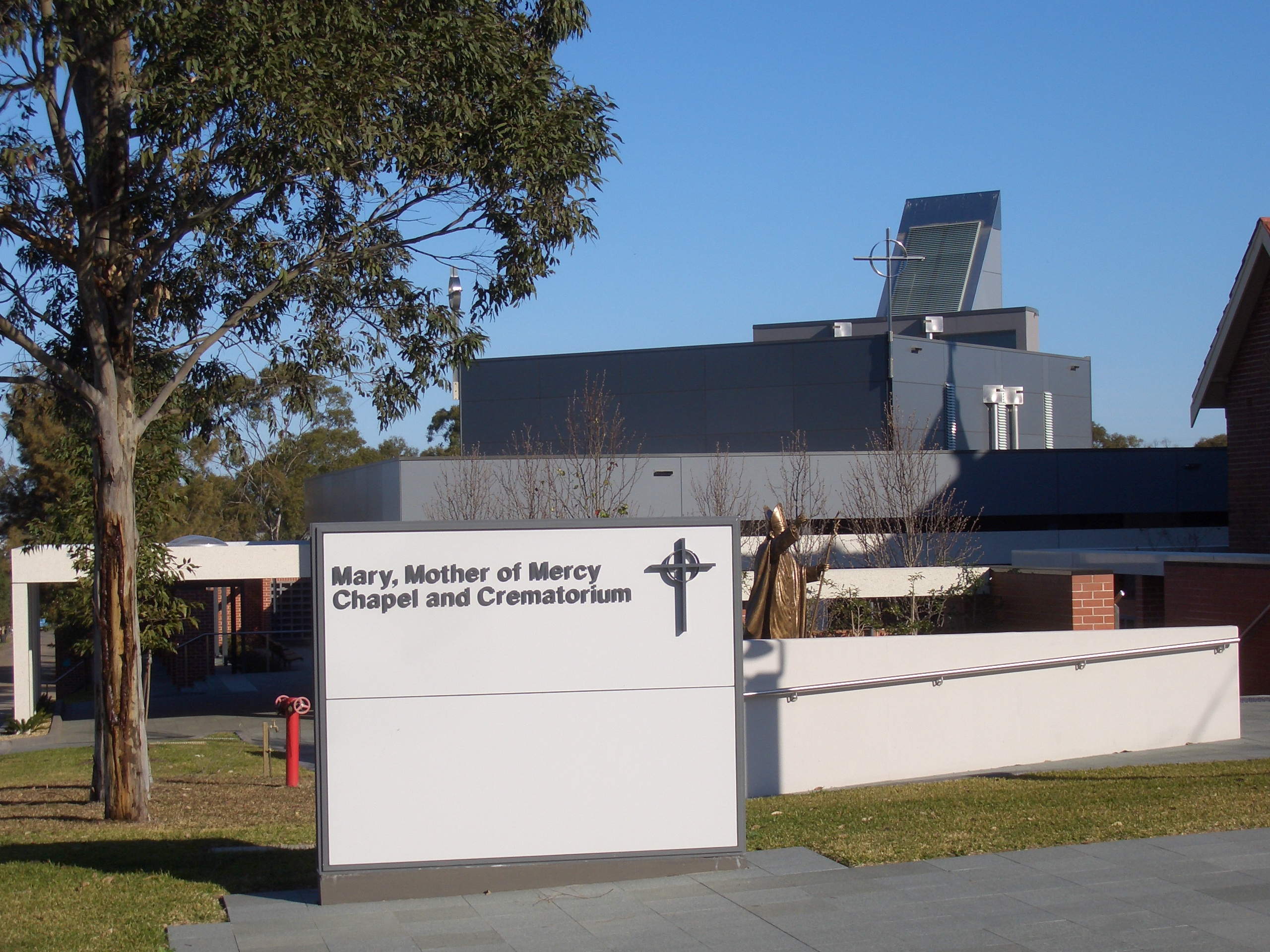
Mary, Mother of Mercy Catholic Chapel

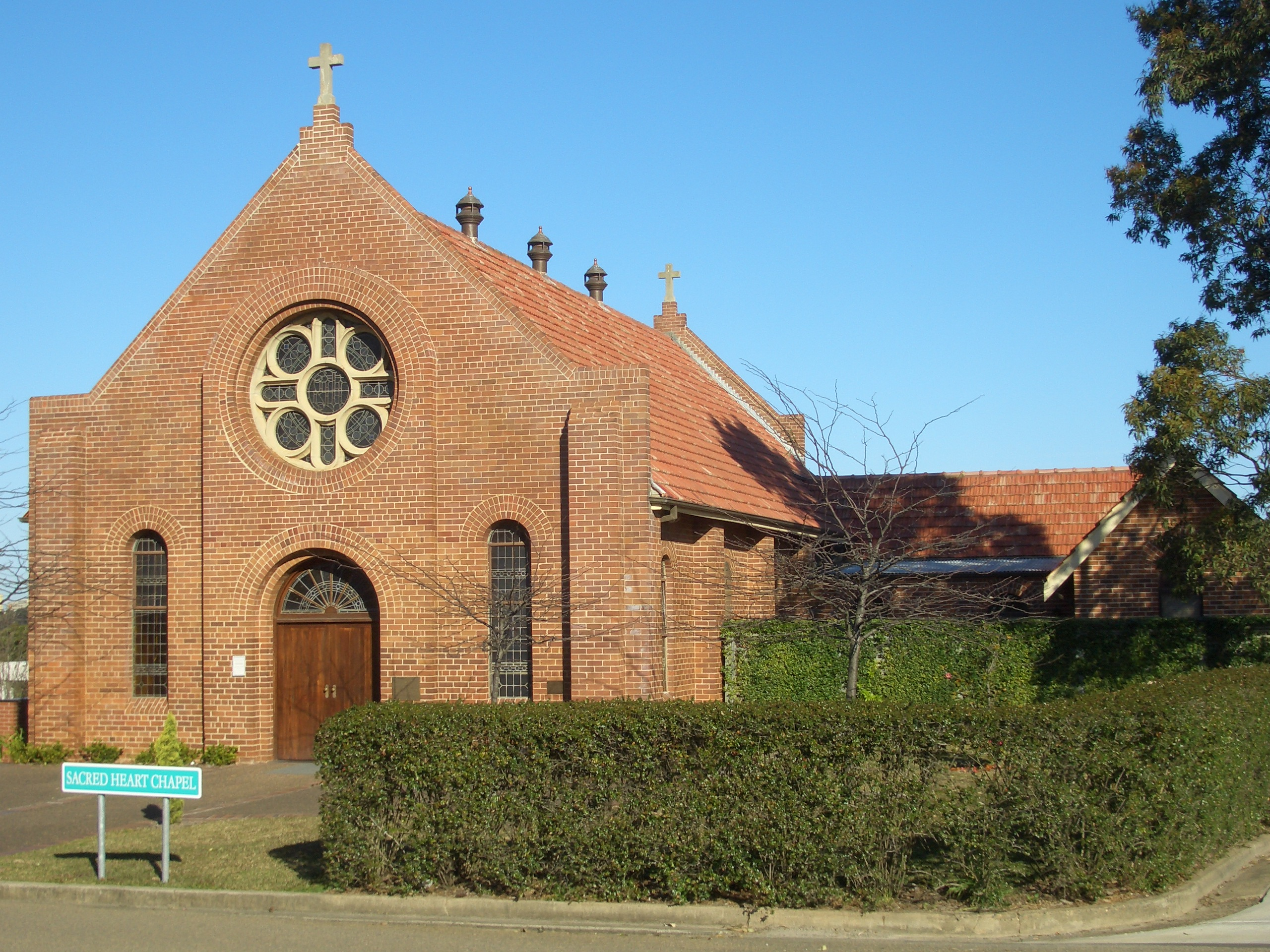
Sacred Heart Chapel Catholic Chapel

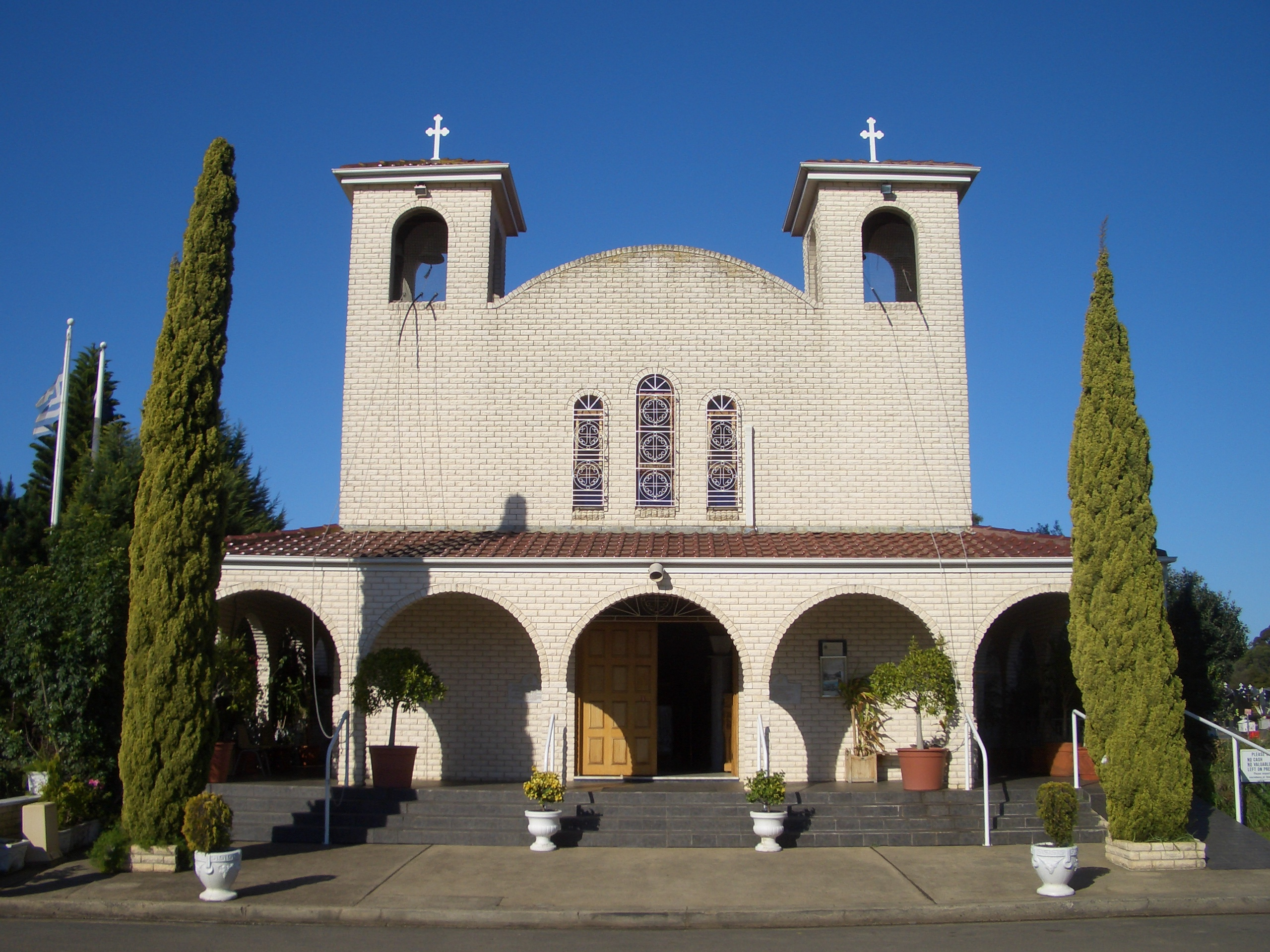
St Athanasios Greek Orthodox Church

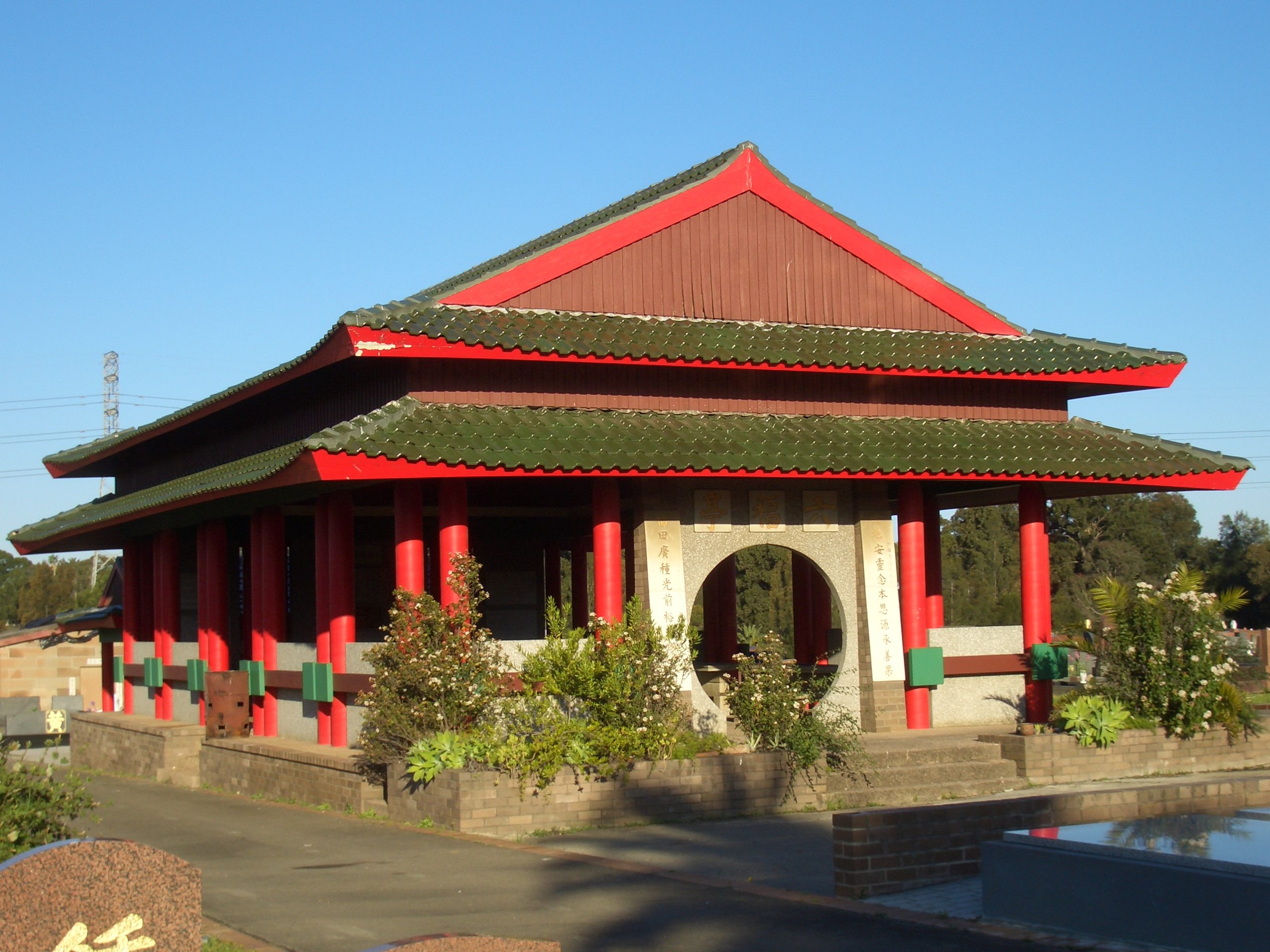
Chinese Temple

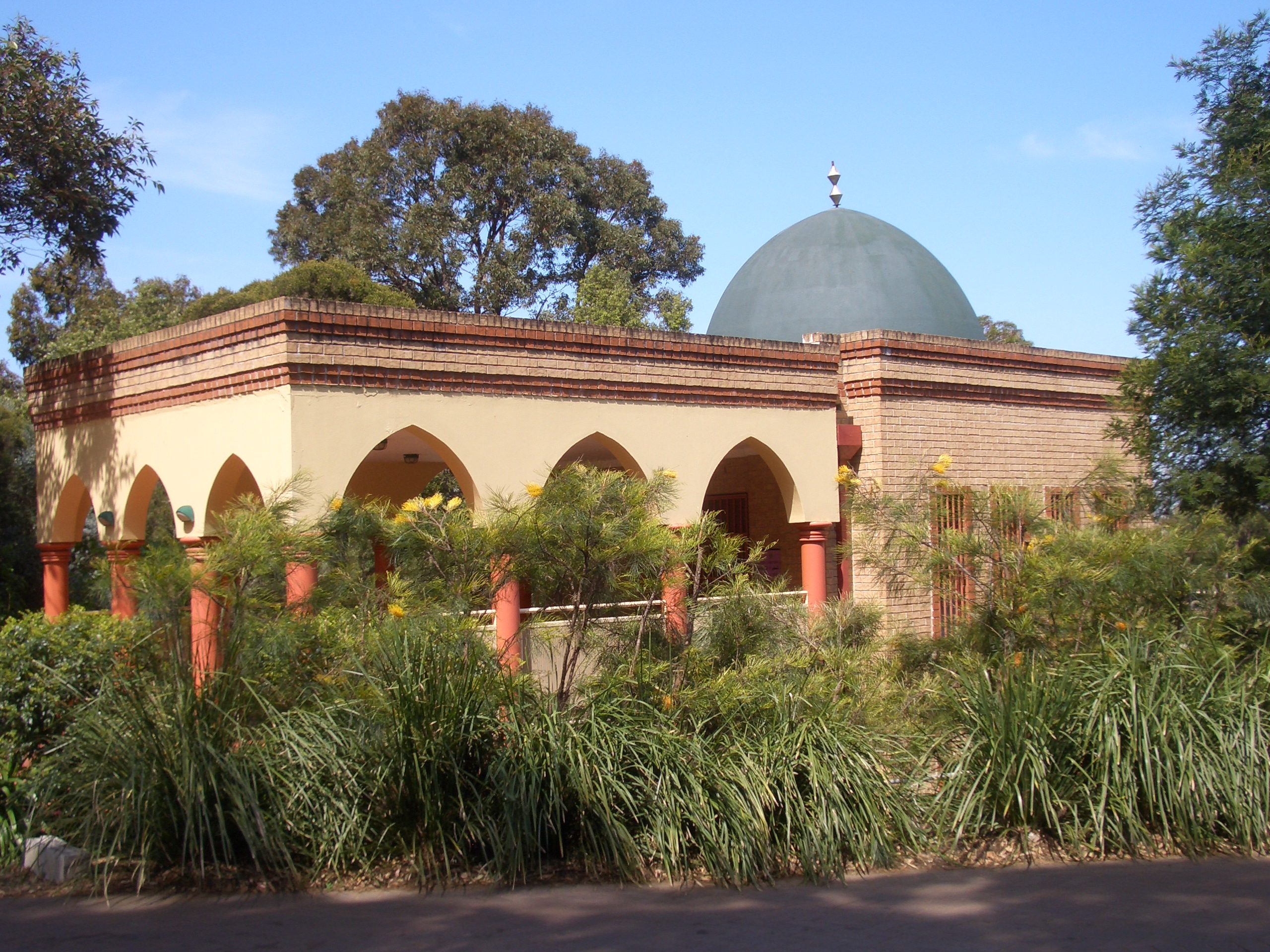
Rookwood Islamic Monument

== Monuments and memorials ==
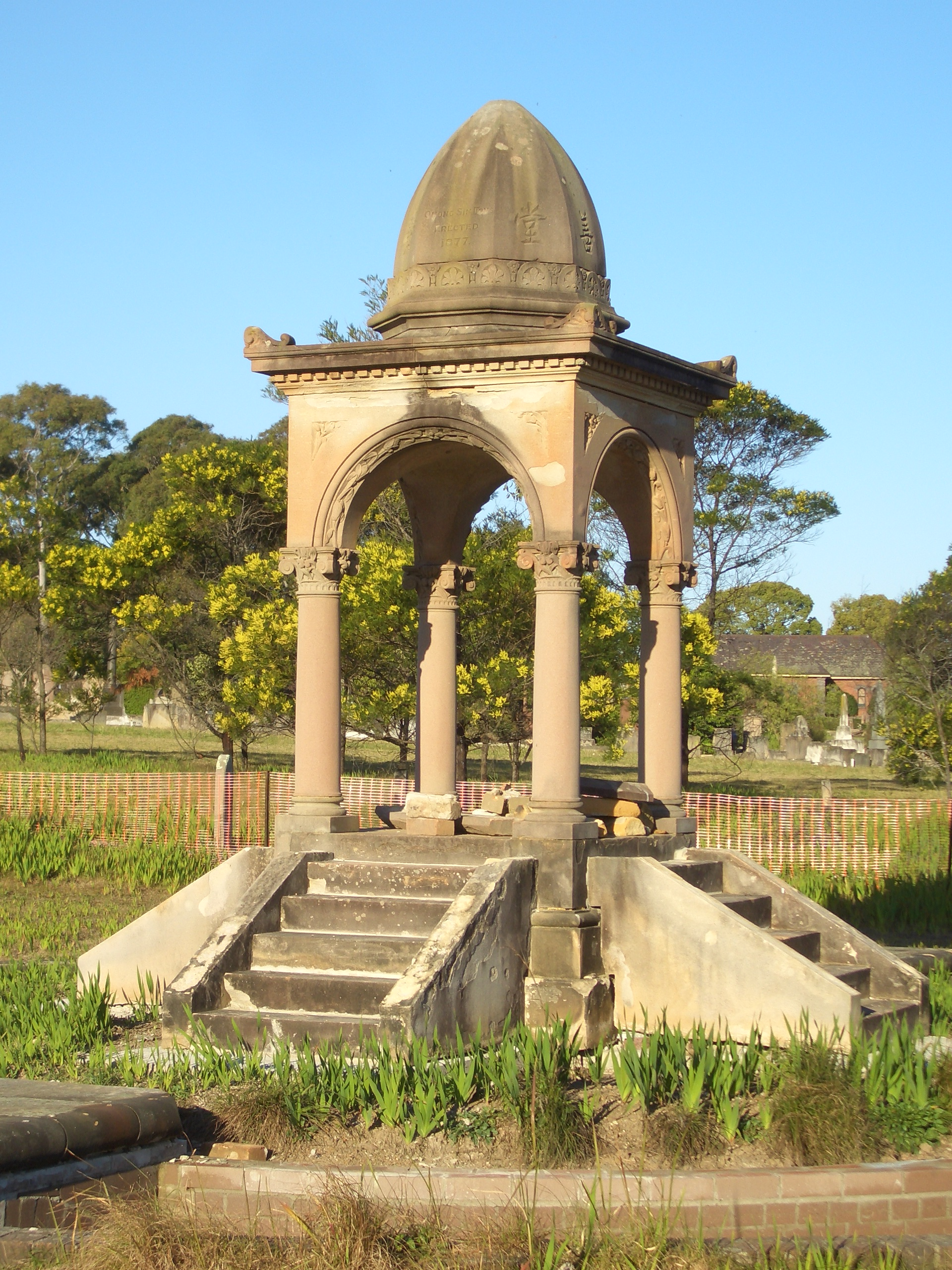
Quong Sin Tong Shrine

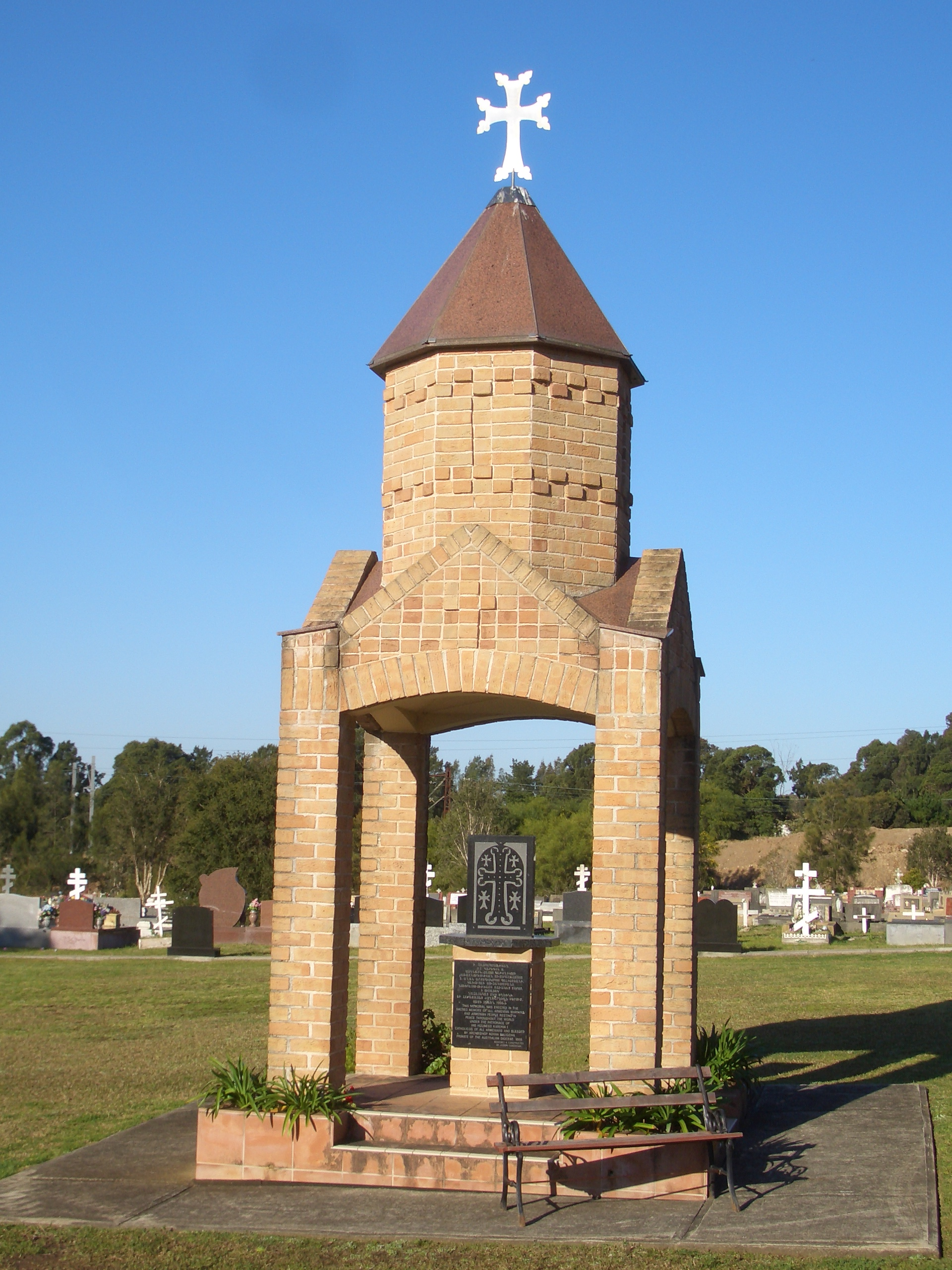
Armenian Memorial

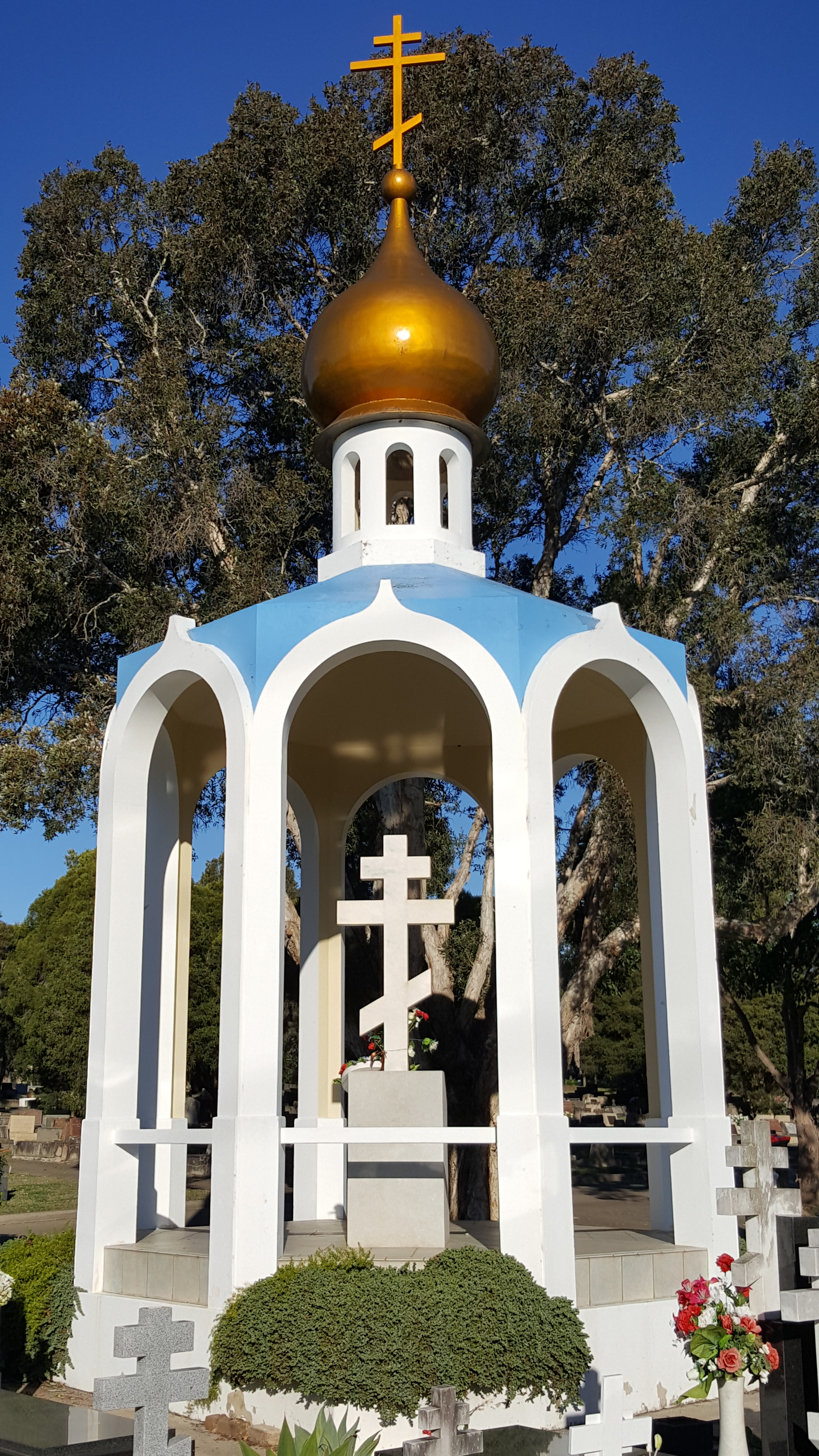
Russian Memorial

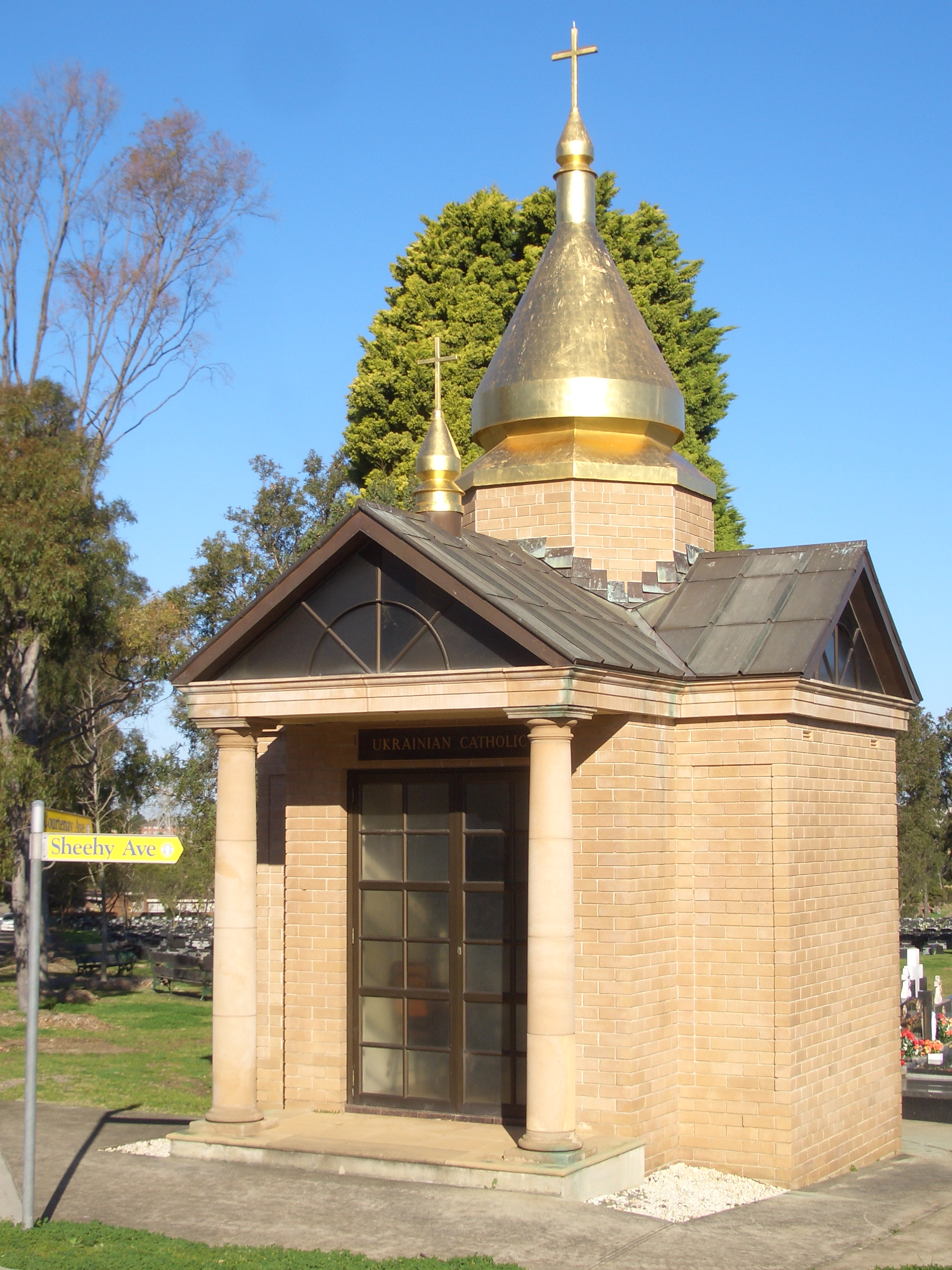
Ukrainian Catholic Priest Vault

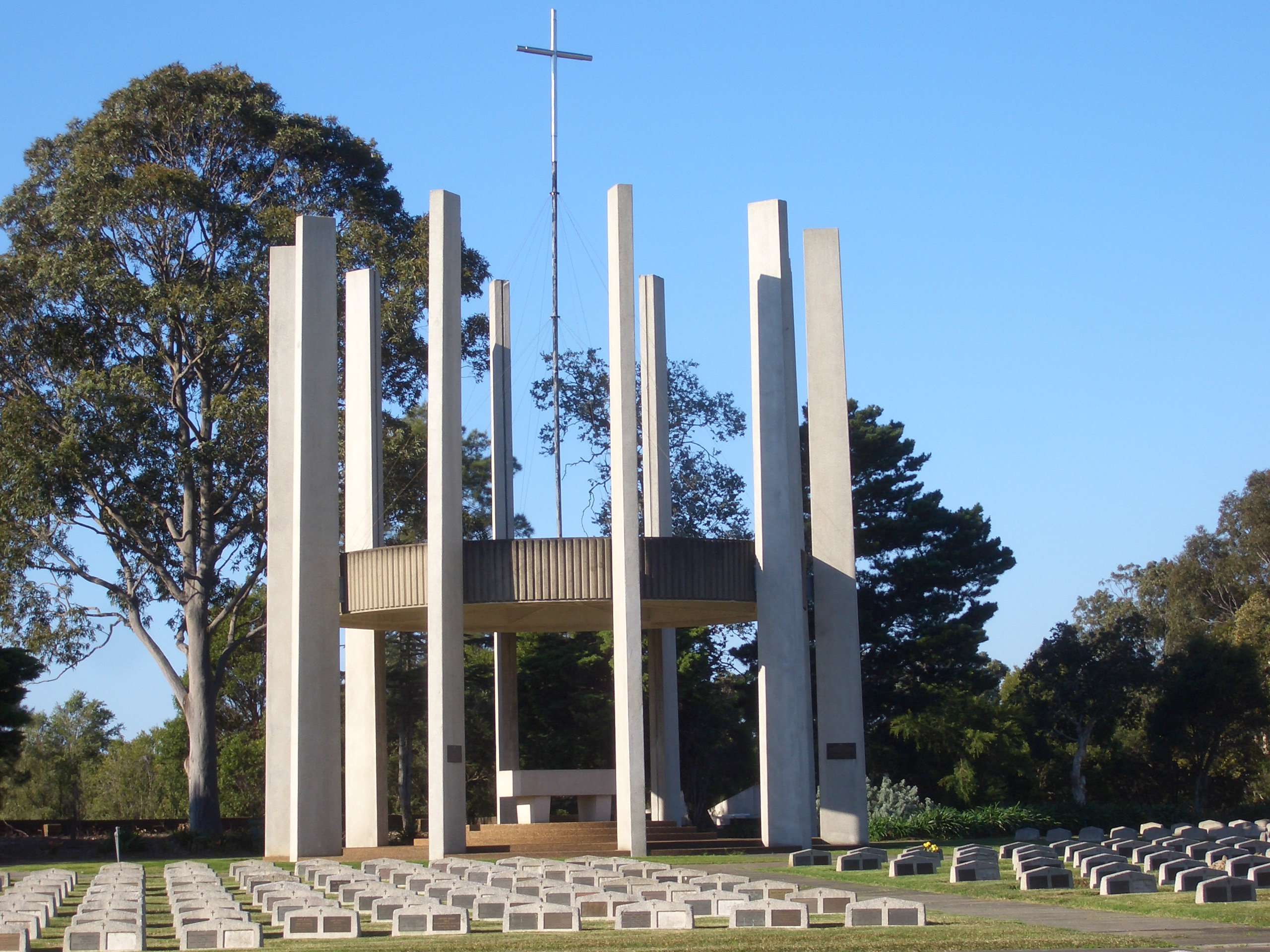
Crown of Thorns Altar

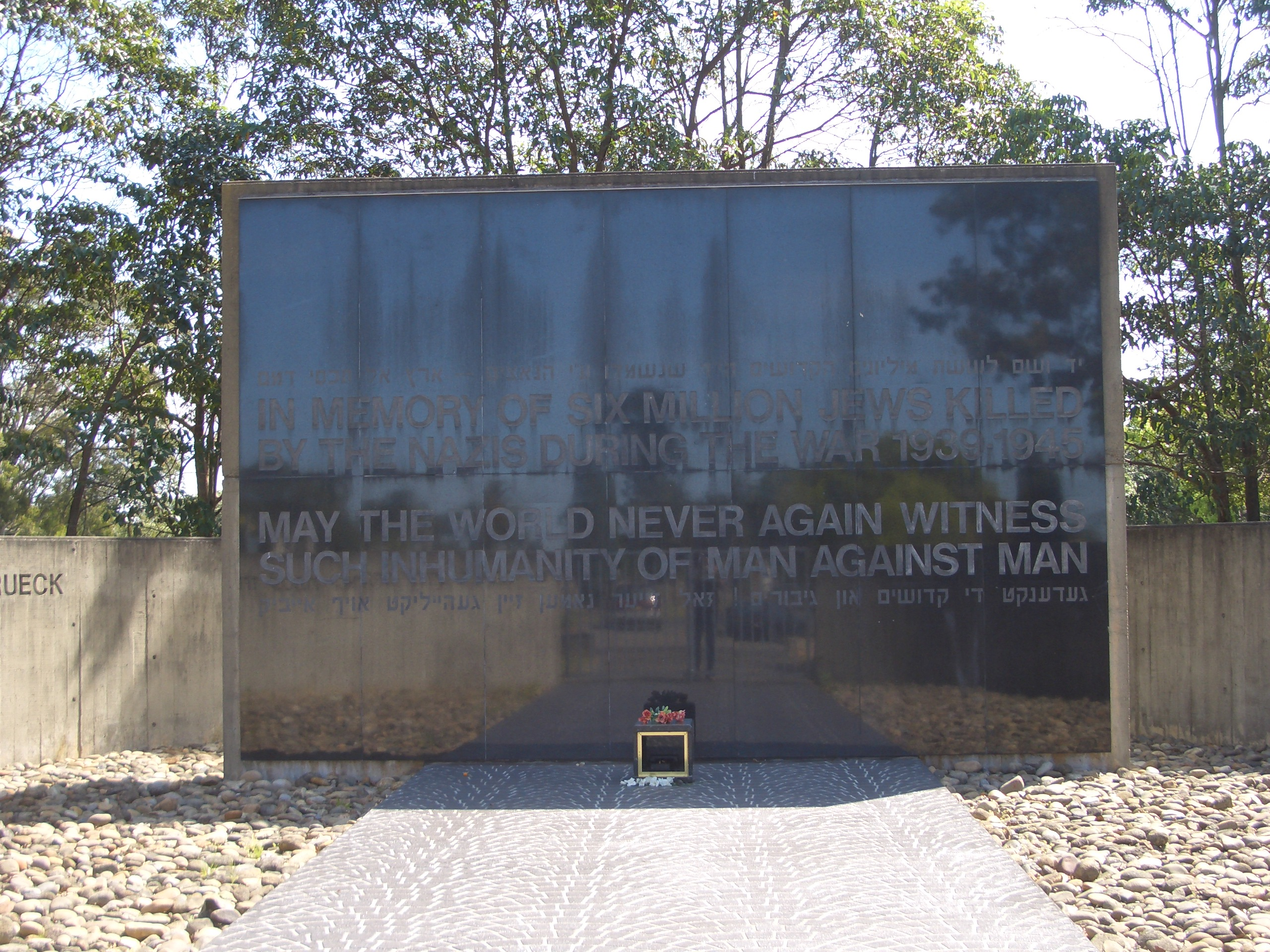
Jewish Memorial

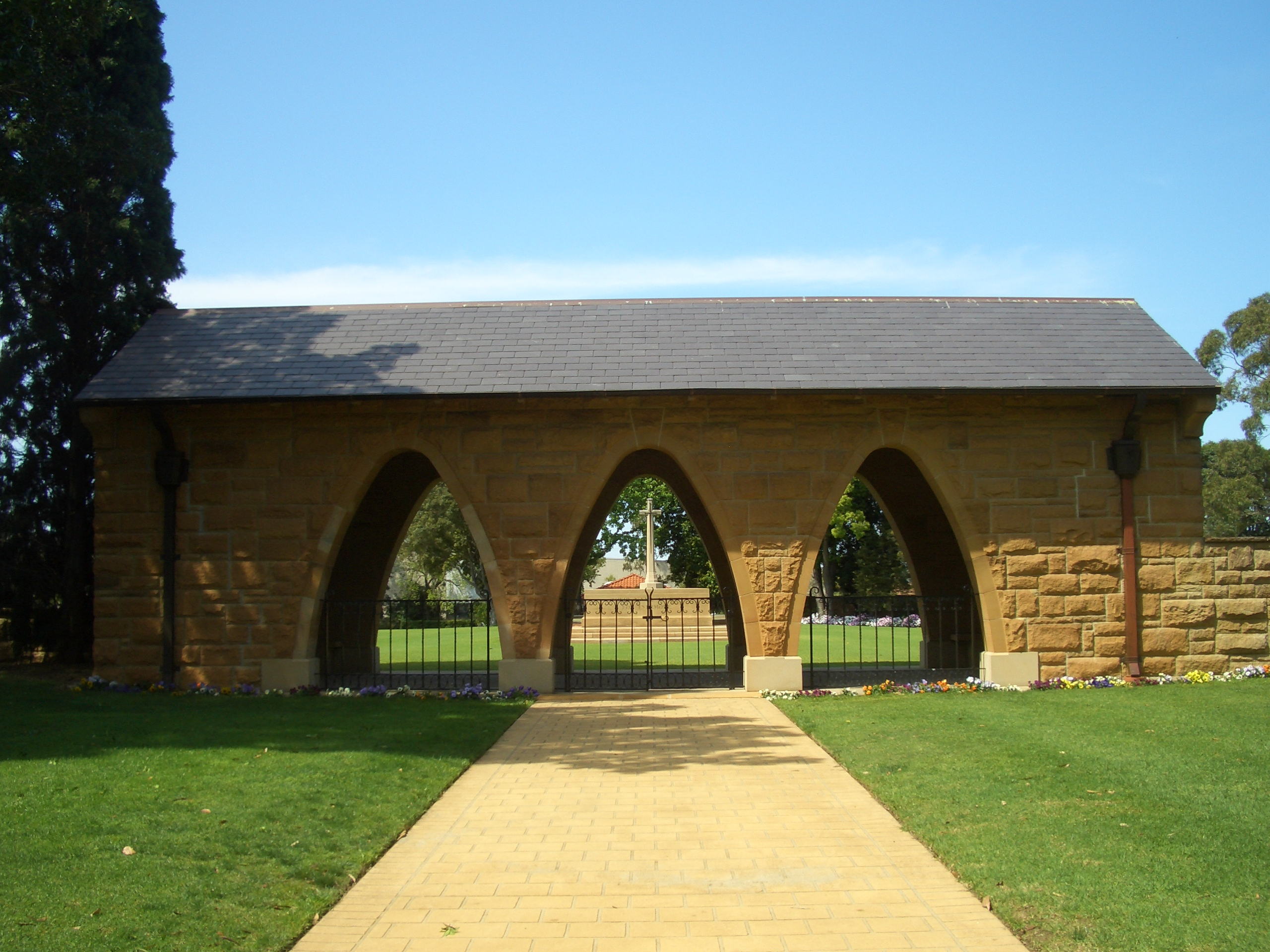
Garden of Remembrance

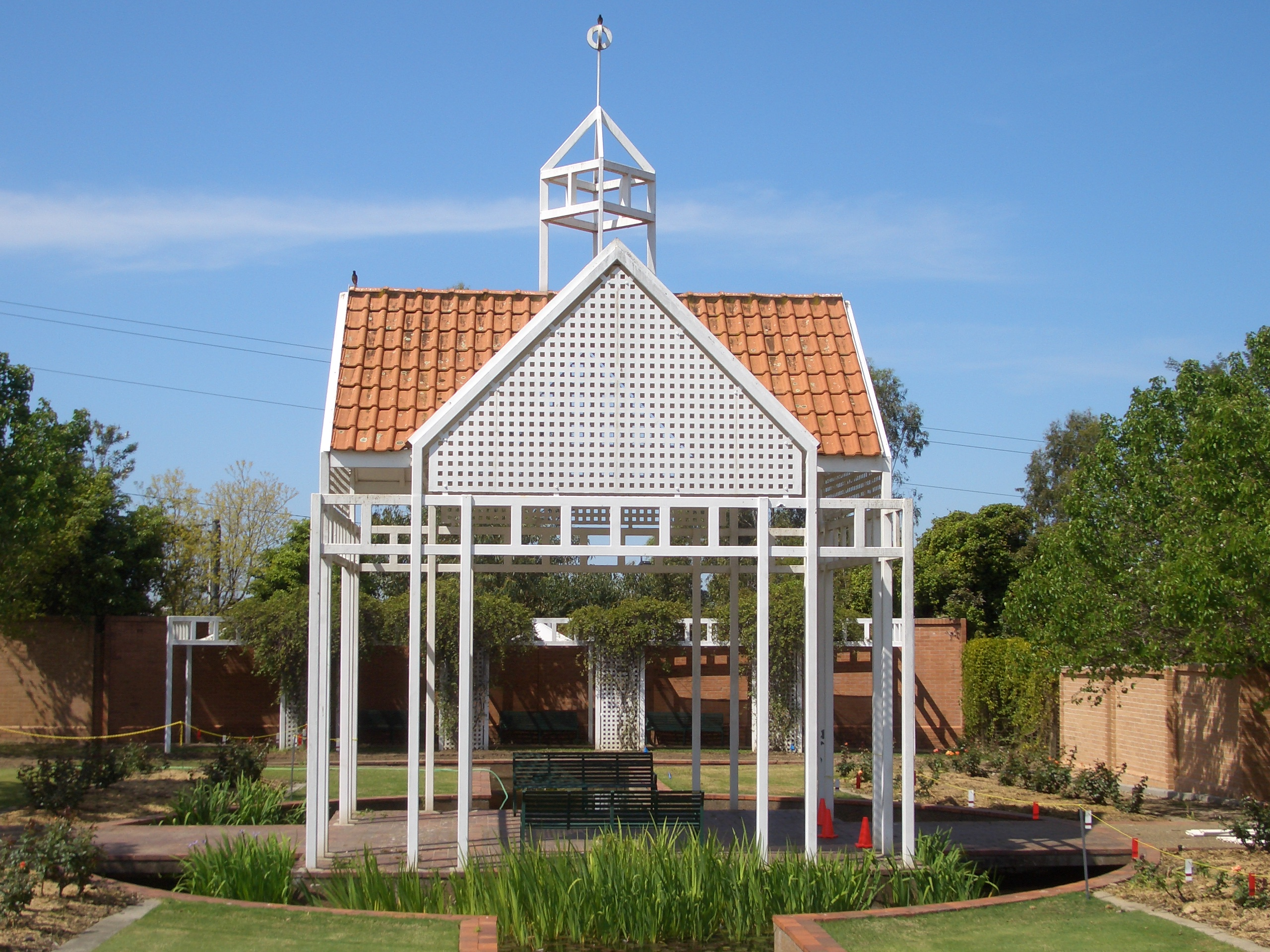
Garden of Remembrance

== Graves and mausoleums ==
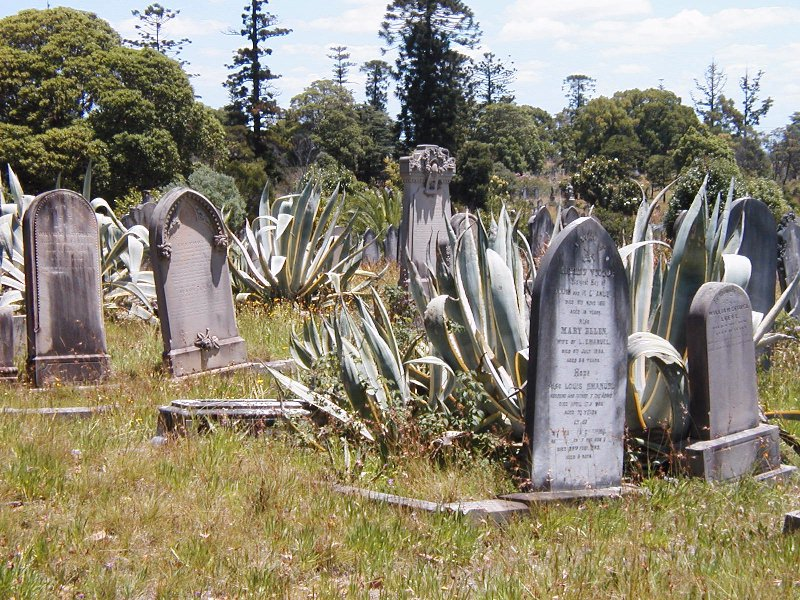
Graves overgrown with Agave americana, Araucaria spp. in background

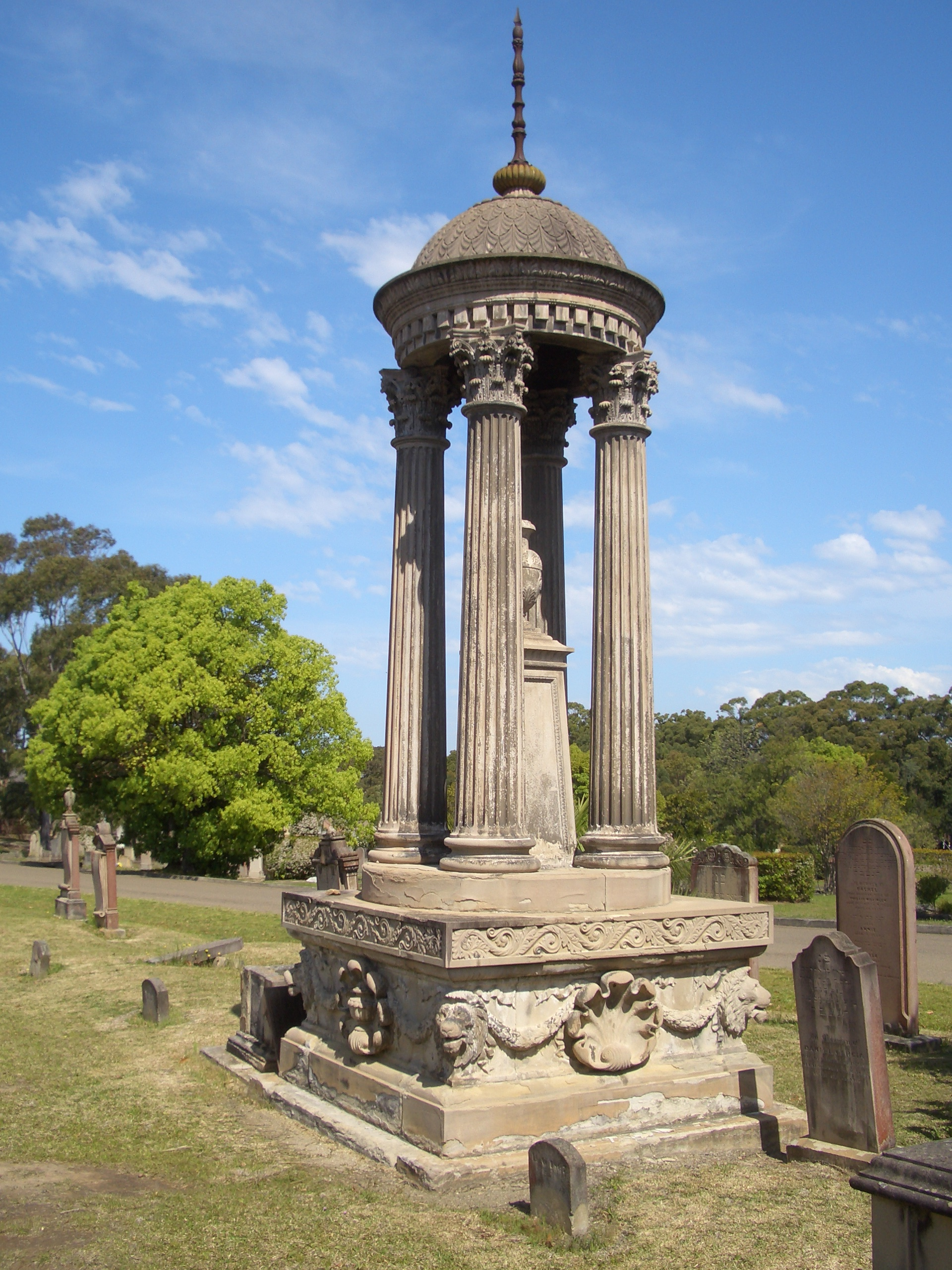
Sandstone memorial

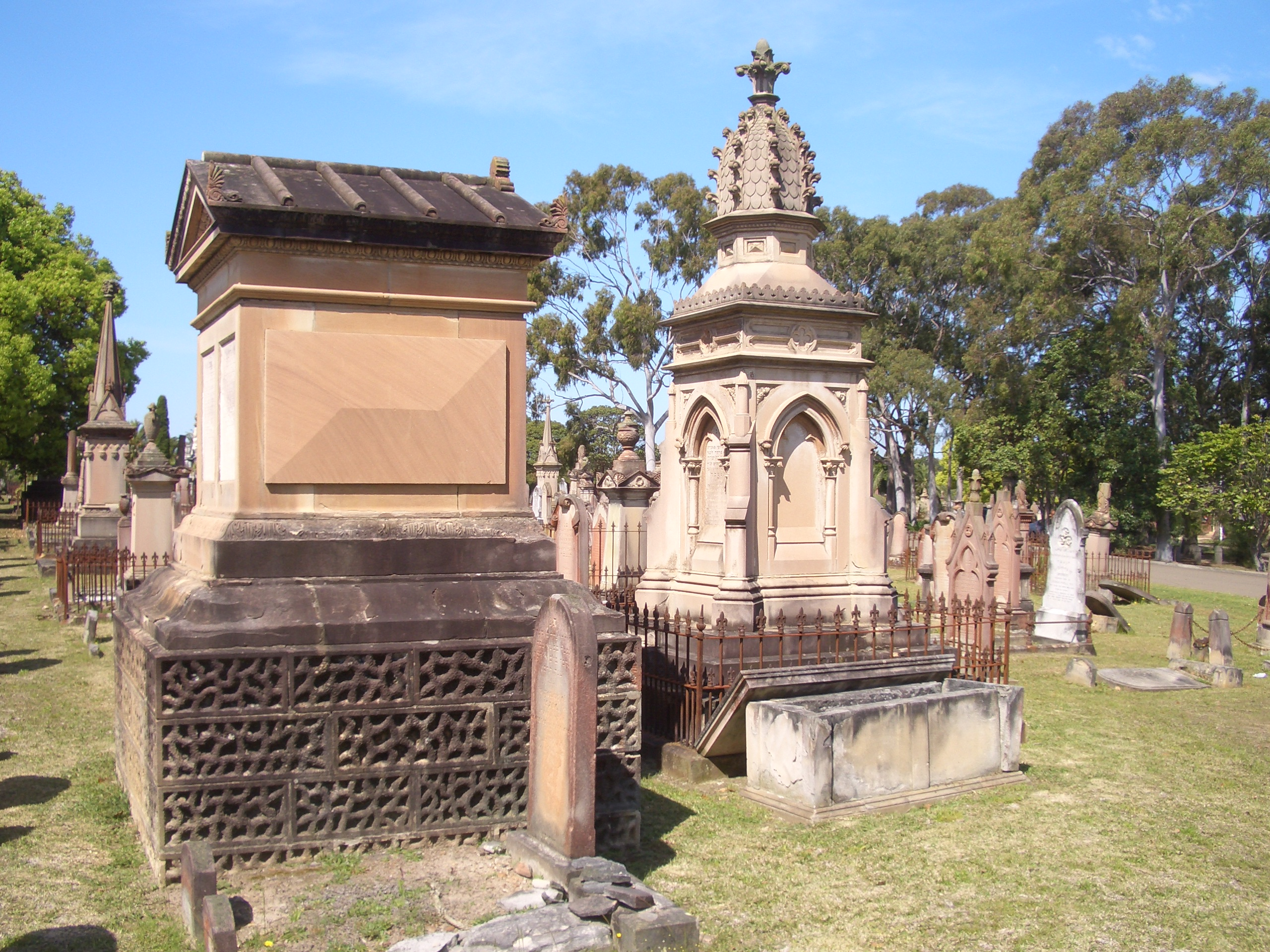
Sandstone monuments

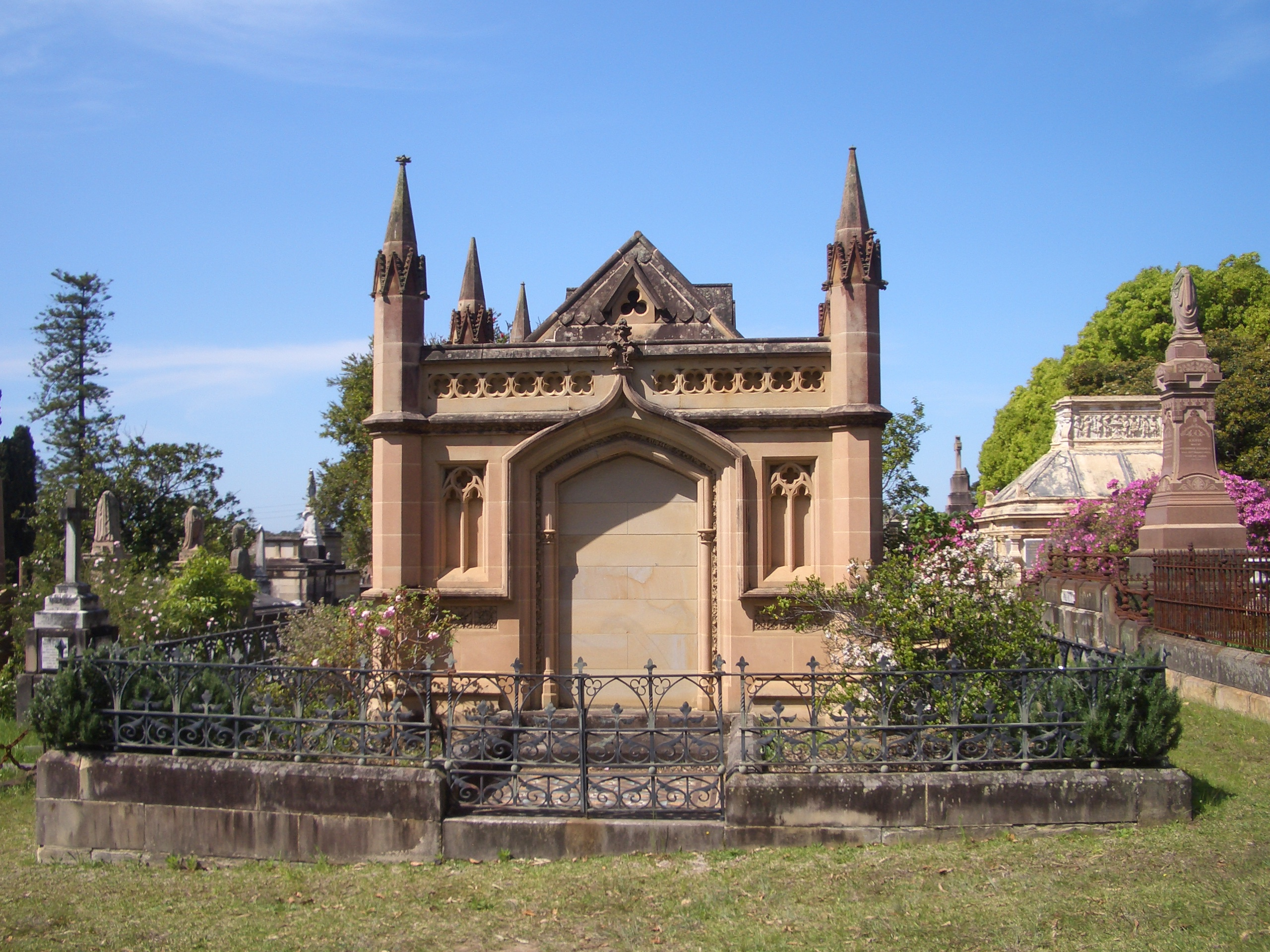
Family Vault

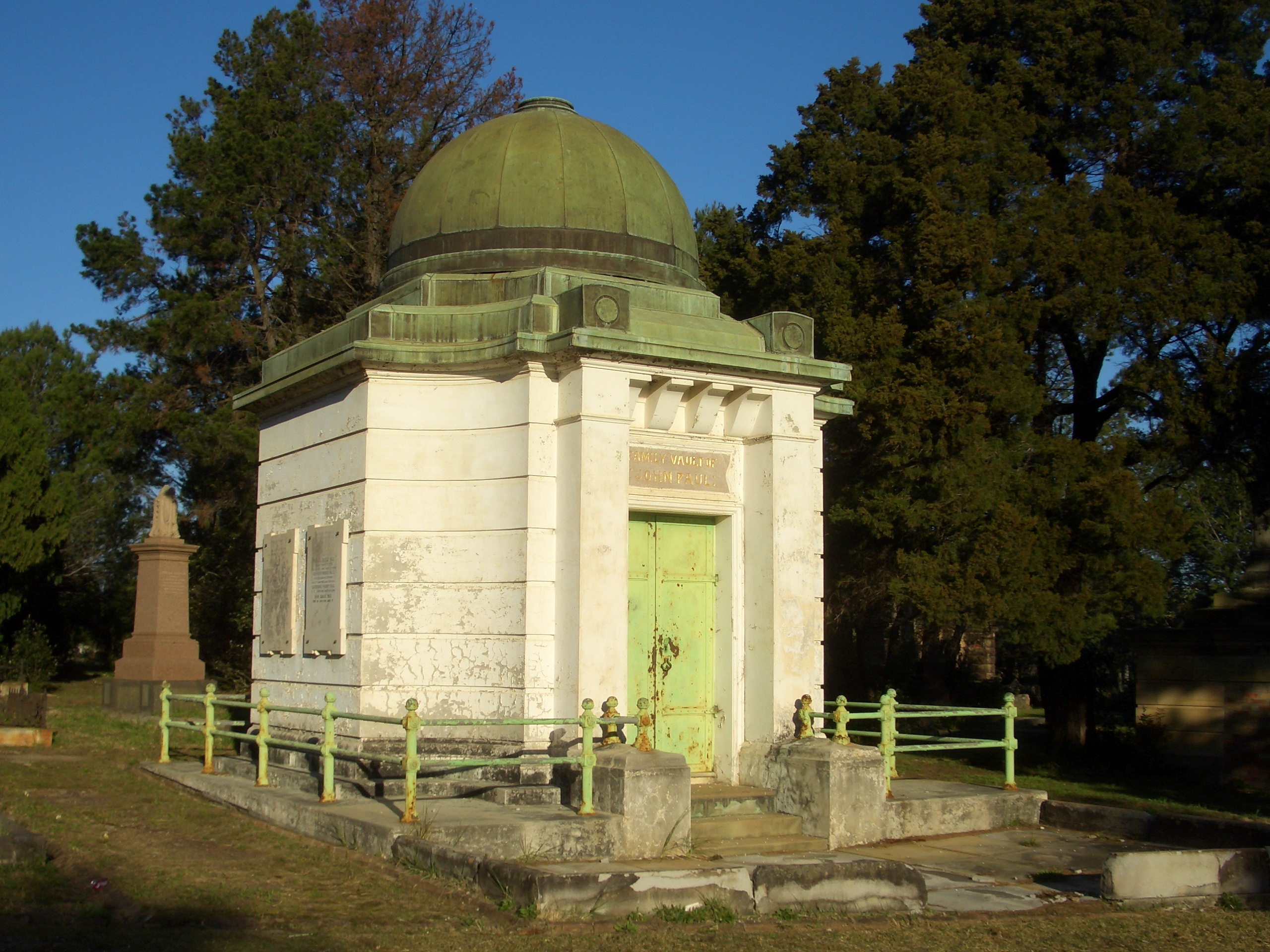
John Paul Family Vault

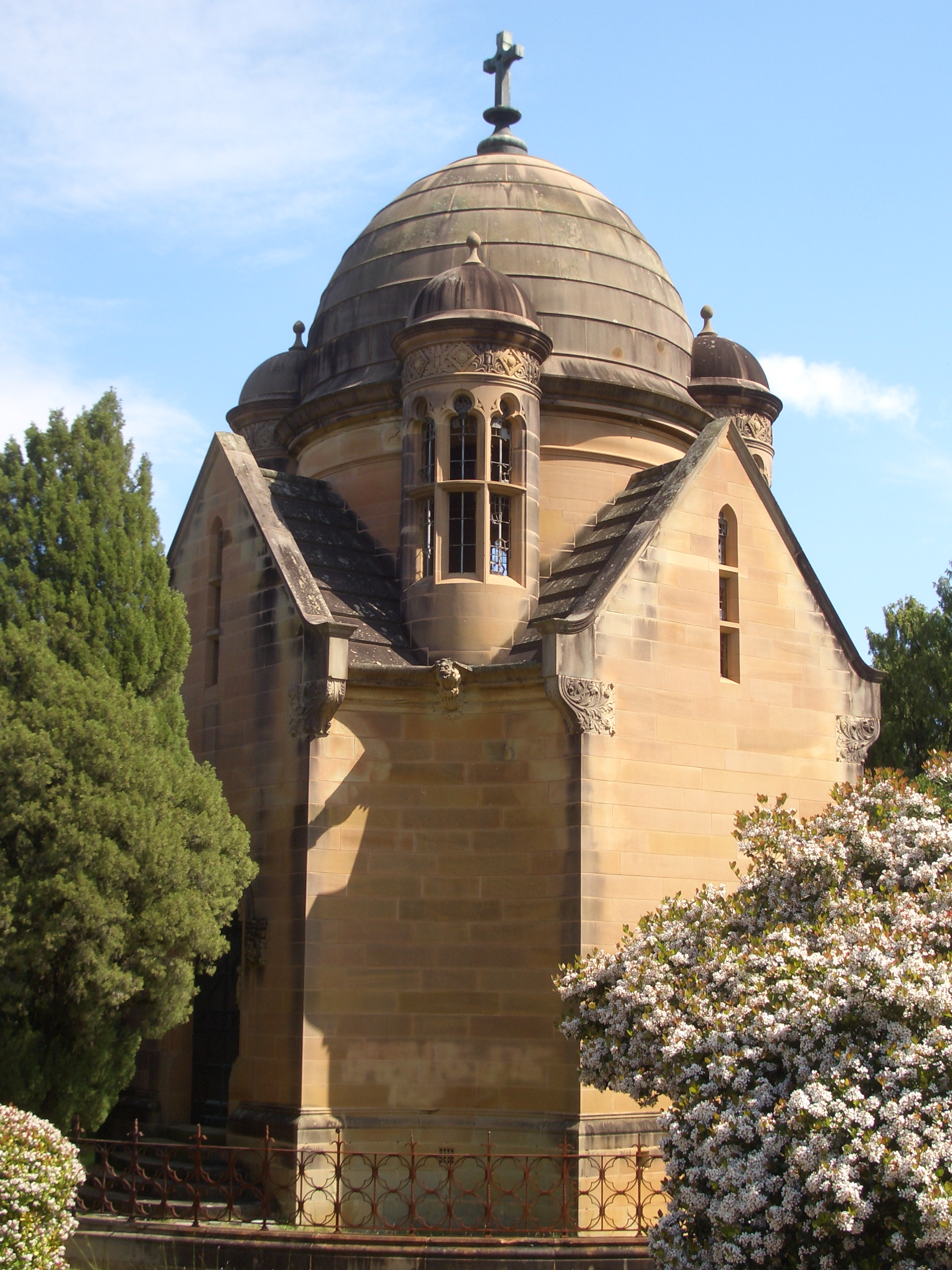
Frazer Mausoleum

Grave of Premier of NSW Jack Lang

Family grave of NSW Premier, Joseph Cahill

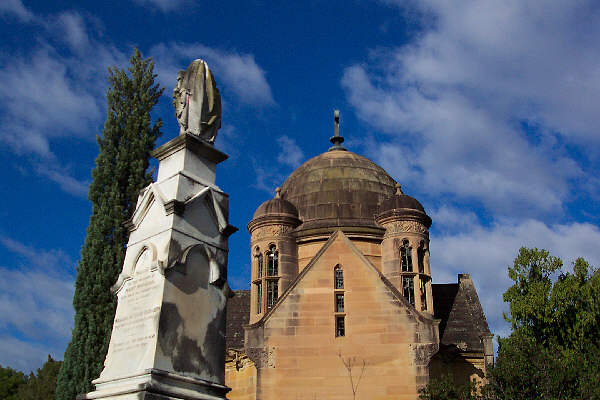
Frazer Mausoleum

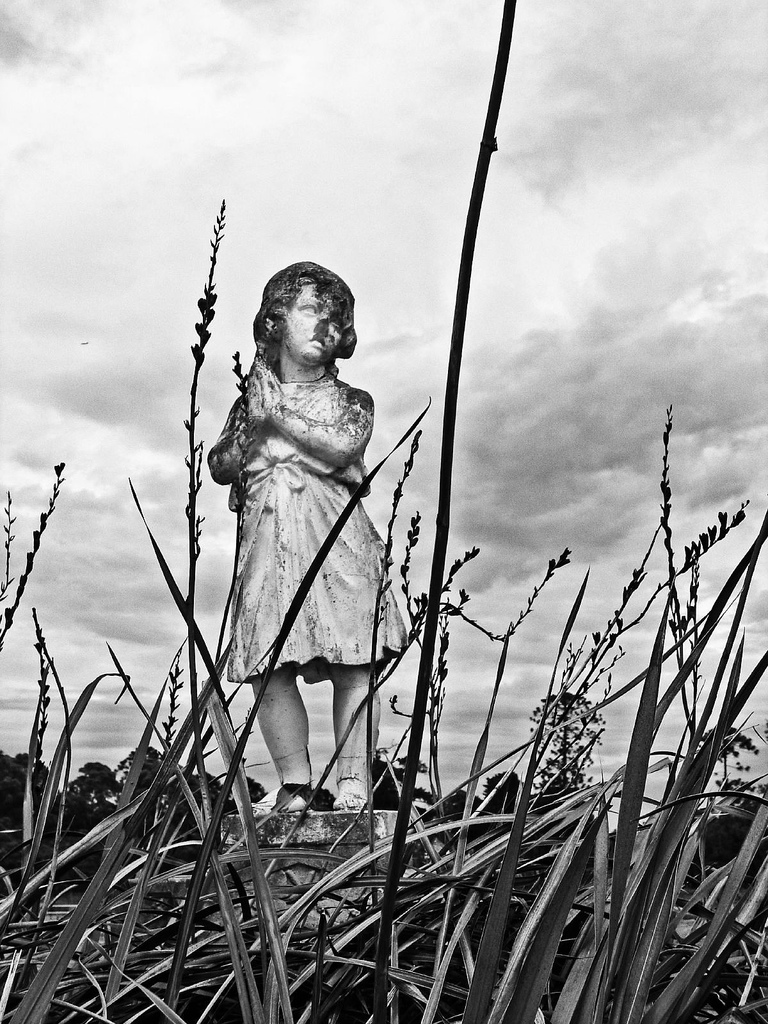
A small statue near a grave.

== Buildings ==
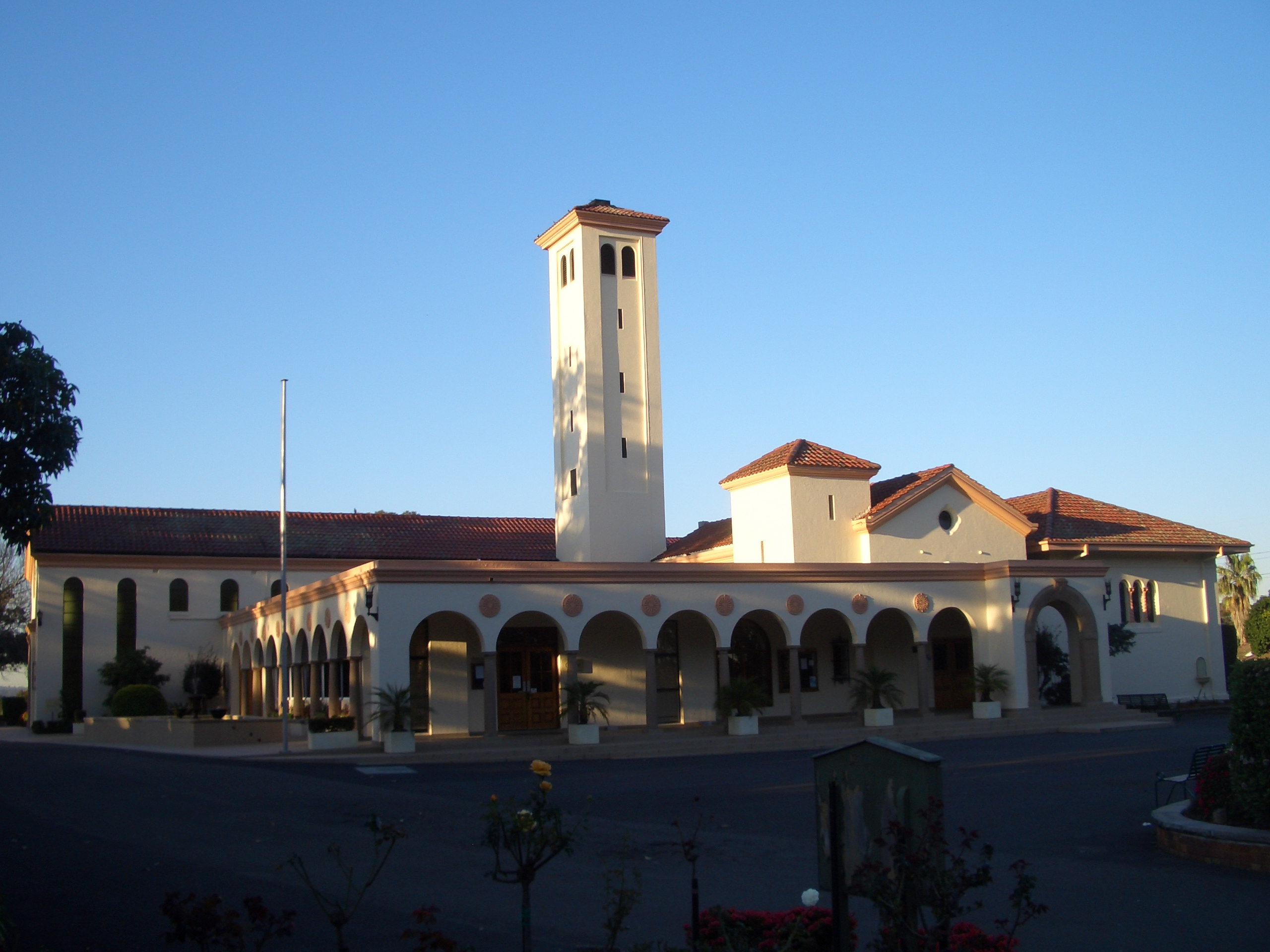
The Rookwood Memorial Gardens Crematorium

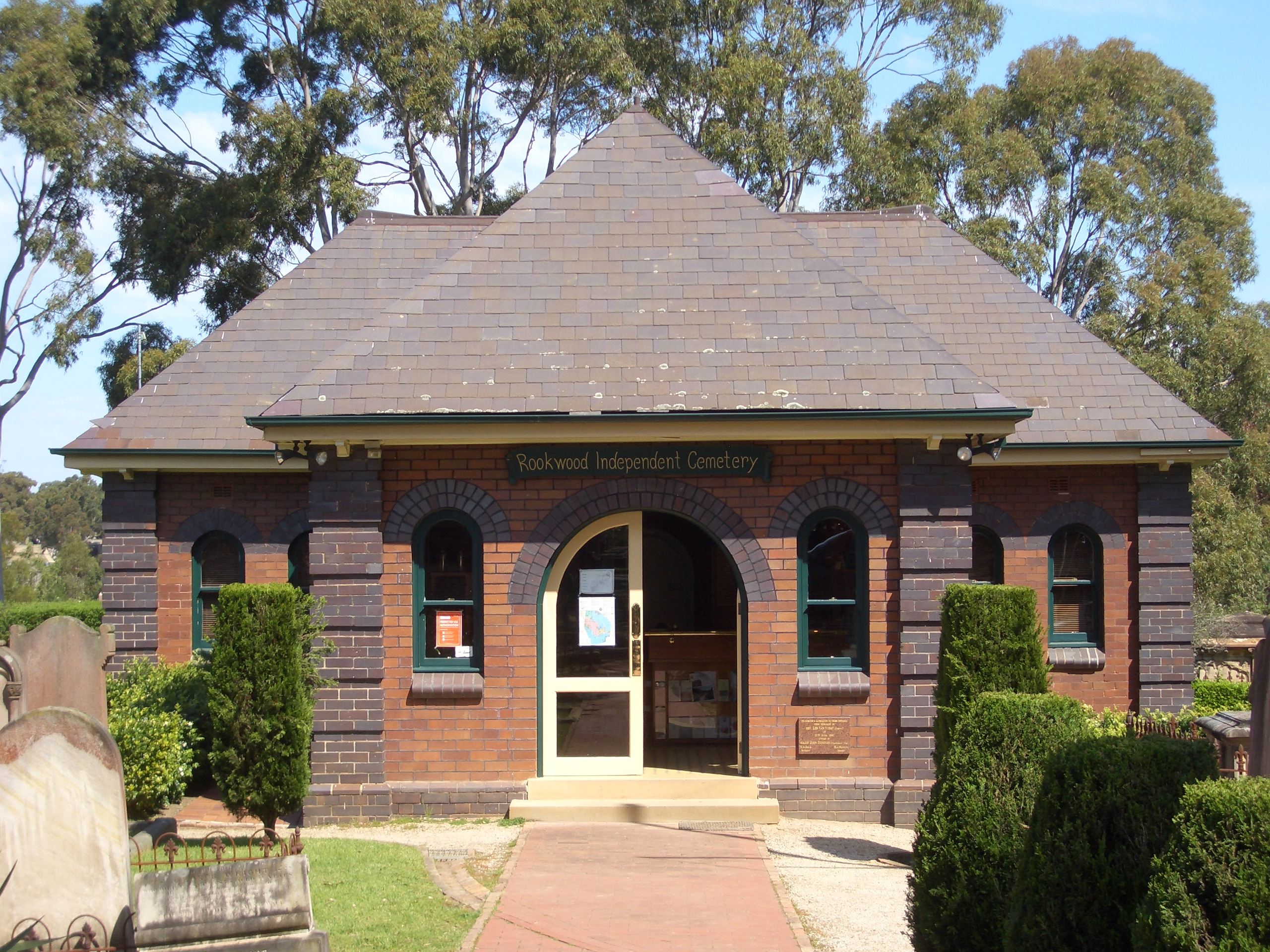
Independent Office

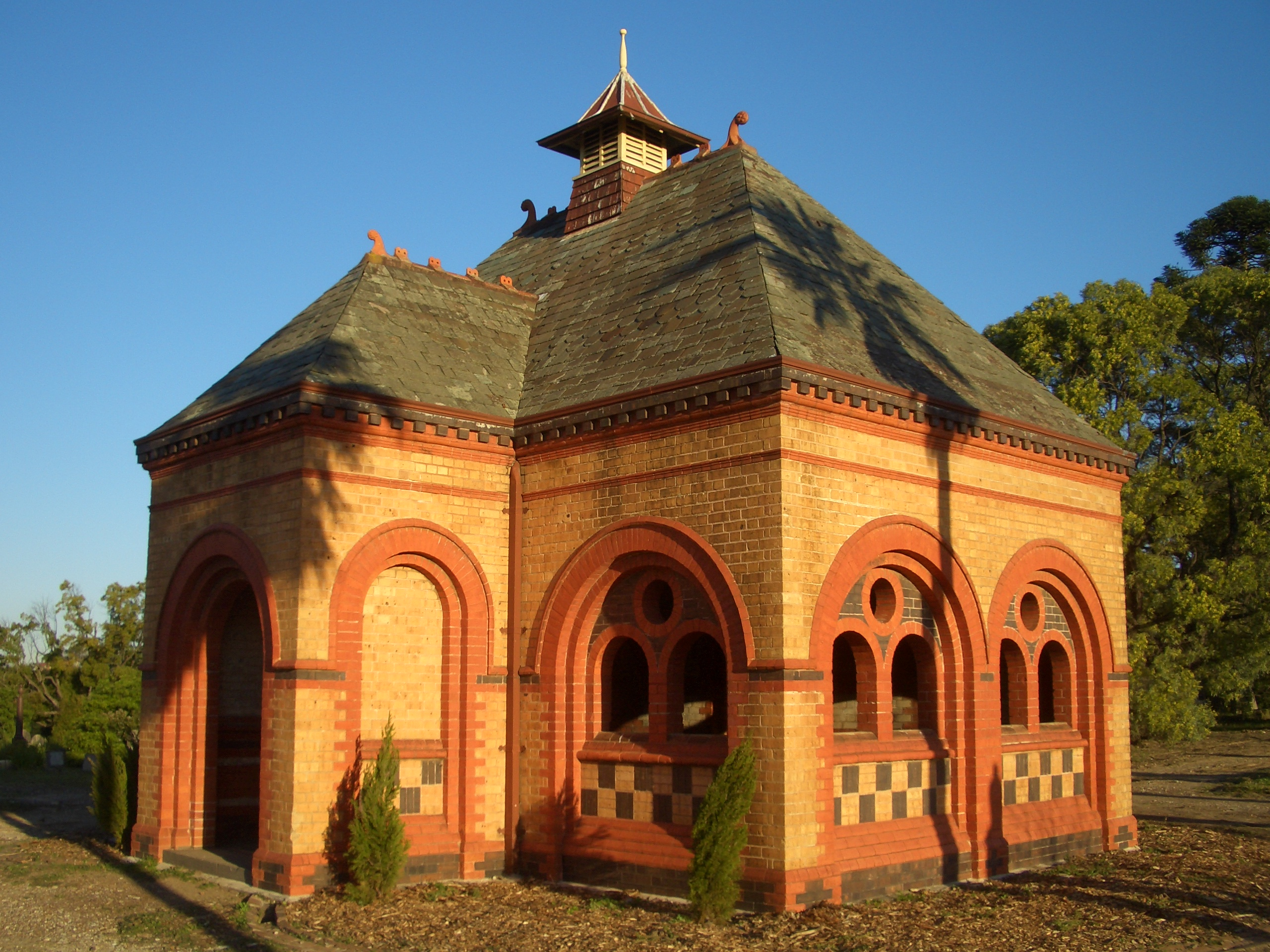
Elephant House

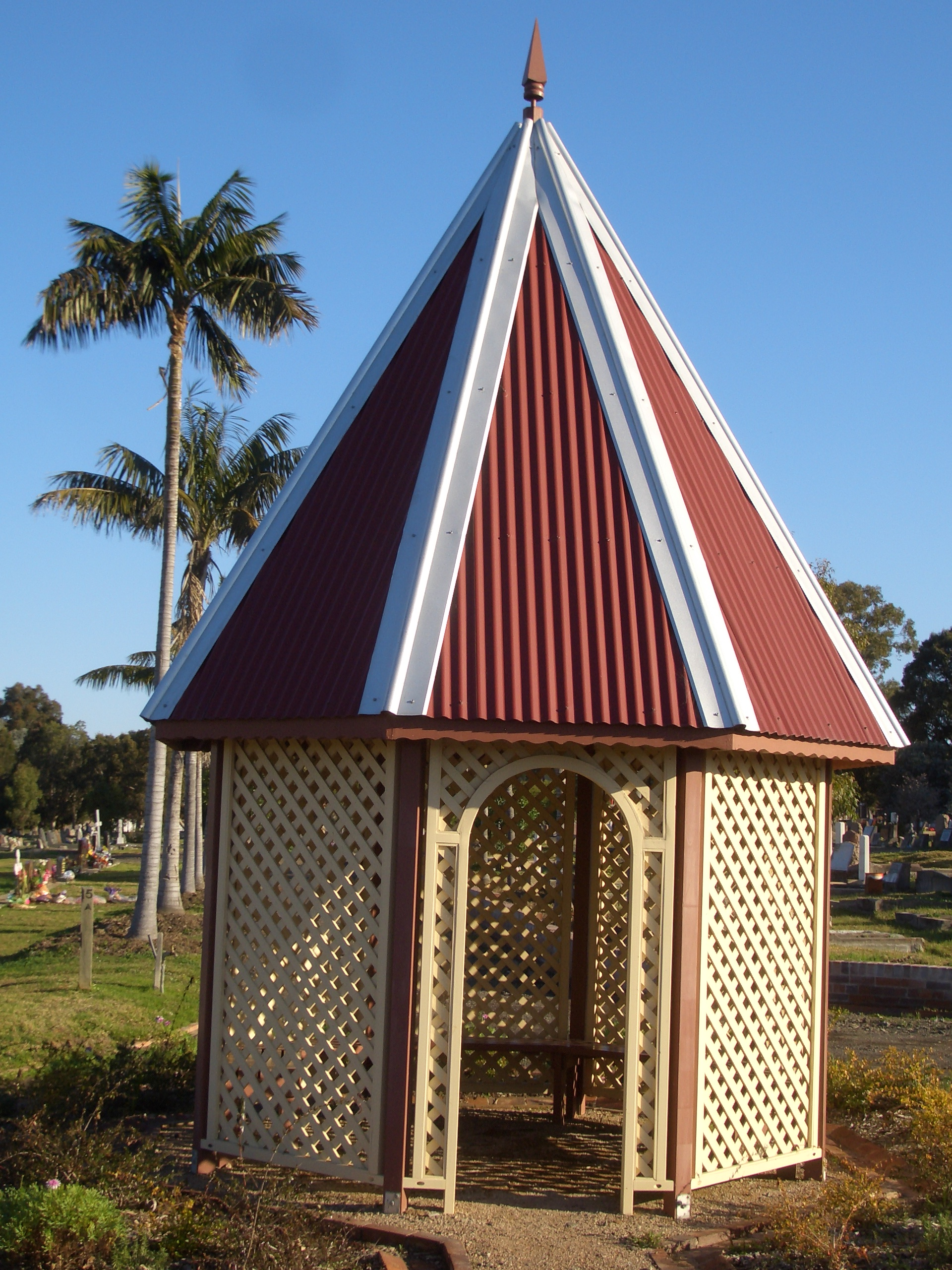
Rotunda
