= Royal Philatelic Society of Victoria =

Philatelic Society

The Royal Philatelic Society of Victoria is a philatelic society based in Melbourne, in the state of Victoria, Australia.

== History ==
The society was founded in Melbourne in 1892 as The Philatelic Society of Victoria and it received the "Royal" prefix in 1947.

== Aims ==
The aims of the society are to:

- Promote the hobby of philately in all aspects.
- Promote and support the art, education, study, research, activity, interests and status of philately in the State of Victoria.
- Promote fellowship among philatelists.
- Encourage interest in philately generally.

== Activities ==
As well as holding regular meetings, the society publishes books and has an expertising service.

== Selected publications of the society ==
- The Philatelic Society of Victoria 1892-1926, A.J. Derrick, 1926.
- Catalogue of the Australian National Philatelic Exhibition, 1950.
- The Postal History of Port Phillip District 1835-1851, J.R.W. Purves, 1950.
- New South Wales Numeral Cancellations, Alan G. Brown & Hugh M. Campbell, 1963. (With Robson Lowe Ltd.
- The Pictorial Stamps of Tasmania 1899-1912, K.E. Lancaster, 1986.
- Century of Happiness: The Centennial History of the Royal Philatelic Society of Victoria, H.L. Chisholm, 1992. (J.R.W. Purves Memorial Series No.12)
- The Royal Philatelic Society of Victoria Library: A history and catalogue, Geoffrey Kellow & Russell Turner, 1996. ISBN 0-947345-12-4.
- The Numeral Cancellations of Victoria, Hugh H. Freeman & Geoff T. White, (2001). ISBN 0-947345-16-7
- The Half-Lengths of Victoria: The Stamps and Postal History 1850-59, J.H. Barwis & R.W. Moreton, 2009.
