= Tinsley (surname) =

Tinsley is an English surname. Notable people with the surname include:

- Allan S. Tinsley, Baptist minister in South Australia
- Annie Tinsley (1808–1885, born as Annie Turner), British novelist
- April Tinsley (1980–1988), American murder victim
- Beatrice Tinsley (1941–1981), British-New Zealand astronomer and cosmologist
- Boyd Tinsley (born 1964), American violinist and mandolinist
- Brad Tinsley (born 1989), American basketball player
- Bruce Tinsley (born 1958), American cartoonist
- Catherine Tinsley, American organisational scholar
- Charles James Tinsley (died 1960), Baptist minister in Sydney, Australia
- Clarice Tinsley (born 1954), American broadcast journalist
- Colin Tinsley (born 1935), English footballer
- Dartanyan Tinsley (born 2001), American football player
- Henry Tinsley (1865–1938), English cricketer
- Jamaal Tinsley (born 1978), American basketball player
- Jeffrey Tinsley (born 1973), American businessman
- Marion Tinsley (1927–1995), American checkers player
- Michael Tinsley (born 1984), American track and field athlete
- Mitchell Tinsley (born 1999), American football player
- Pauline Tinsley (1929–2021), British soprano
- Peter A .Tinsley (1939–2018), American Economist
- Samuel Tinsley (1847–1903), English chess player
- Theodore Tinsley (1894–1979), American author
- Walter Tinsley (1891–1966), English footballer
- William Tinsley (architect) (1804–1885), Irish-American architect
- William Tinsley (publisher) (1831–1902), British publisher
- Yvette Tinsley, New Zealand law academic

== See also ==
- Tinsley (disambiguation)
- Dawn Tinsley, character in the BBC sitcom The Office
- Jennifer Tinsley-Williams, a New York City Ballet dancer
