= Stanmore station =

Stanmore station could refer to either:

- Stanmore tube station, London
- Stanmore Village railway station, England (now closed)
- Stanmore railway station, Sydney
