= Tinsley =

Tinsley may refer to:

== People ==
- Tinsley (surname)
- Tinsley Mortimer (born 1976), American socialite
- Tinsley Ellis (born 1957), American rock and blues musician

== Places ==
=== United Kingdom ===
- Tinsley, South Yorkshire, a suburb of Sheffield, England
  - Tinsley Marshalling Yard, a former railway marshalling yard
  - Tinsley Motive Power Depot, a former depot
  - Tinsley railway station, a former station
  - Tinsley Viaduct, a two-tier road bridge in Sheffield, England; the first of its kind in the UK
- Tinsley Green, West Sussex, England
- Tinsley House Immigration Removal Centre, an immigration removal centre

=== United States ===
- Firebase Tinsley, a military fire support base
- Tinsley, Mississippi
- Tinsley House (museum), part of the Museum of the Rockies in Bozeman, Montana

== Court cases ==
- Tinsley v Milligan, a 1993 English trusts law case
- Tinsley v. Richmond, a 1961 United States Supreme Court case
- Tinsley v. Treat, 205 U.S. 20 (1907)

== Other ==
- Dawn Tinsley, a character in the sitcom The Office
- Shane Tinsley, a character in the TV series Glee
- Beatrice M. Tinsley Prize, awarded by the American Astronomical Society

== See also ==
- Tinsel (disambiguation)
