= New South Wales Aboriginal Education Consultative Group Office =

- Location of the NSW Aboriginal Education Consultative Group Office in greater Sydney New South Wales Aboriginal Education Consultative Group Office (Australia)
- 33°53′52″S 151°10′10″E
- Location: 37 Cavendish Street, Stanmore, Inner West Council, New South Wales, Australia

History
- Built: 1887–1888

Site notes
- Architectural style: Italianate Victorian

New South Wales Heritage Register
- Official name: New South Wales Aboriginal Education Consultative Group Office; NSW Aboriginal Education Consultative Group Office and Records; NSW AECG Office
- Type: State heritage (built)
- Designated: 19 January 2018
- Reference no.: 1964
- Type: Other - Aboriginal
- Category: Aboriginal

New South Wales Aboriginal Education Consultative Group Office, abbreviated as NSW Aboriginal Education Consultative Group Office, is a heritage-listed former Aboriginal land, farm and house and now education centre and teacher-training facility at 37 Cavendish Street, Stanmore, Inner West Council, New South Wales, Australia. It was built from 1887 to 1888. It is also known as NSW Aboriginal Education Consultative Group Office and Records and NSW AECG Office. It was added to the New South Wales State Heritage Register on 19 January 2018.

== History ==
=== Land ownership history - pre and post contact ===
The land on which the NSW Aboriginal Education Consultative Group (AECG) office now stands, at 37 Cavendish Street, Stanmore is the traditional land of the Cadigal and Wangal people of the Dharug nation. The Cadigal land stretches from South Head, through central Sydney to the area around Petersham and to the south along the Cooks River. Wangal land was located from about present day Birchgrove and ran west along the southern shore of the Parramatta River to Rose Hill near Parramatta.

The Cadigal and Wangal people were salt water people, skilled at living from the coastal and harbour waters and resources of the Cooks River. Accounts from the memoirs of First Fleet officers W. Clements and J. Saddlier describe seeing Aboriginal people fishing from canoes and others preparing fish on the banks of the Cooks River. The existence of several large shell middens at the mouth of the Cooks river and near the many sandstone rock shelters in the escarpment running along the Cooks River, also attests to the skill of the traditional landowners in harvesting the resources of their environs.

The traditional people of the area also made use of resources of the woodlands away from the waterways where plants were foraged and kangaroo, birds and possums were hunted. Campsites were most often made near the coast and river especially during the warmer seasons of the year. Movement through the Cadigal and Wangal territory was made via regularly used tracks many of which have been adapted as roads for later colonial and modern-day movement around Sydney.

In 1788, Governor Arthur Phillip arrived in Sydney Cove and established the penal colony of NSW. After this the lives of the Cadigal and Wangal people changed dramatically. Their traditional food supply was encroached upon by the new settlers and the diseases such as smallpox the Europeans brought with the, severely decimated the local Aboriginal population.

The pattern of European dispossession of Aboriginal people from their land accelerated, when in 1792, Governor Phillip received "Additional Instructions" dated 1789, allowing him to grant land for church and school uses. Church and School and Crown lands which extended to the north eastern corner of the former Municipality of Marrickville.

Further communiques from the British government allowed the granting of land to British Officers in 1792. With the aim of establishing a chain of farms between Sydney and Parramatta, land grants were made along the road to Parramatta. In 1793 Lieutenant Thomas Rowley was granted land, an estate he named Kingston, in the area now known as Newtown, part of Camperdown and part of Stanmore. It is within the area of this land grant that the NSW AECG office is located.

In 1871 the Petersham Municipal Council was incorporated and the Council area encompassed Cavendish Street. By 1879 the western rail line was well established and Stanmore gained a railway station providing convenient access to Sydney. The area soon became home to many city workers as well as well-heeled businessmen such as William Paling of Palings Music Store who lived on the corner of Cambridge and Merchant Street, Stanmore and Alexander Stuart, Premier of New South Wales (1883-1885) who lived in "The Lodge" which had been constructed by William Paling.

One city merchant and entrepreneur who settled in the Stanmore area was John Bardsley who in 1888 constructed the Victorian Italianate residence at 37 Cavendish Street Stanmore, which is now the office of the NSW AECG.

In 1927, property was sold out of the Bardsley family and underwent several changes of ownership through the twentieth century. In 1974 the Inner City Education Centre Cooperative Ltdbought the property. This began the building's association with the field of education.

In 1990, the Aboriginal Education Consultative Group (AECG) moved premises from Sydney city to share the premises at 37 Cavendish Street with the Inner City Education Cooperative. In 1997 the Inner City Education Centre ceased operation and transferred the building to the NSW AECG. The title specifies that should the NSW AECG vacate premises, the building would revert to the Department of Education.

=== History of Aboriginal Education in pre and post contact Australia ===
Prior to European settlement in Australia young Aboriginal people were immersed in a whole-of-life educational experience. They learned of the world around them and of how to be in this world through observation of elders, and through practical involvement in the activities necessary to daily life; hunting, sheltering and healing among other things. They also learned of their place in the network of relationships between people and places in their world and of the pervasive spiritual values of these relationships. Knowledge was passed on from elders and was reinforced in dance, ceremonial activities, songs and storytelling.

In the very early years of European settlement in NSW, the gradual dispossession of the Cadigal and Wangal from their traditional lands impacted on these traditional ways of gaining knowledge. Early contact with the Cadigal and Wangal included several attempts to detain local people such as Bennelong and attempt to teach them about English language and culture. Other young Aboriginal people, often after being left parentless, were adopted and given a European style education either at home or at school. From early colonial attempts at providing European education, right up to this day, Aboriginal people often had the experience of a double education - attending white school from 9 am to 3pm and immersed in Aboriginal education in the ways of their land and people the rest of the time.

There a number early institutions involved in educating and training young Aboriginal people the first being the "Native Institution" in Parramatta, initiated under the direction of Governor Macquarie in 1815. This school was subsequently moved to Blacktown in 1822-3 and was located near the first land grants made to Aboriginal people. The focus of the Native Institution was to train Aboriginal children in the skills of domestic service or farming, with a view to student providing service to colonists at the end of their training. This school produced a model student in Dharug girl Maria Locke, (daughter of Yellamundi) who in 1819 was the highest achiever in the Anniversary School's examinations.

Other "experiments" in educating Aboriginal people in the early decades of the colony included introducing a number of Aboriginal children from the former Blacktown Native Institution to the Liverpool Orphan School. This scheme had as its aim to see whether mixed schooling would encourage the assimilation of Aboriginal children into white society. The Blacktown Native Institution was revived in 1827 and Aboriginal, non Aboriginal and Maori students were taught in segregated classes. When this Institution was finally closed down in 1829, students were sent to Liverpool where they were taught in a segregated environment by Rev. Cartwright.

From 1925 the Christian Missionary movement in NSW became an important provider of education in the colony. Schools on the Missions were attended by Aboriginal children only. After 1881 some Mission Schools received government funding. Despite this the prevailing attitude towards educating Aboriginal children was negative. The 1849 Select Committee review of Aboriginal education in government and non-government schools found that "Aboriginal people could not be changed by European education" and concluded that funding should be provided only to non Aboriginal students. In 1853 the NSW Board of Education re-endorsed this finding.

A change in policy came about in 1866 when the NSW Council for Education was formed and the Public Schools Act was enacted. This allowed for full-time government schools to be established in areas where 15 - 24 pupils regularly attended and half time schools were able to be established for 20 pupils. During the 1870s Aboriginal families began to enroll their children in NSW public schools in order to give them opportunities for a better life. In 1880 the NSW Public Instruction Act provided free, compulsory secular education for all children in NSW and many more Aboriginal families enrolled children in public schools. By 1882 a Protector of Aborigines census estimated that 200 Aboriginal children attended school.

Despite Aboriginal children's entitlement to receive a free public education, there were many obstacles to accessing education for Aboriginal families. Often white parents protested against mixed classes resulting in Aboriginal children being excluded from public education. One of the earliest such exclusions occurred at Yass Public School, Aboriginal students were expelled from the school, an action endorsed by the then Minister for Education.

'No child whatever its creed ought to be excluded from a public school. But cases may arise, especially among the Aboriginal tribes, where the admission of a child or children may be prejudicial to the whole school'.

— Cindy Berwick, CEO, NSW AECG, 2015.

Often Aboriginal schools were set up on Aboriginal Stations or Reserves which were set up under the 1883 Aborigines Protection Board. The government made provision for the Reserve Manager to employ a teacher for the Aboriginal children although these "teachers" were often untrained and the curriculum taught often bore little resemblance to that taught in government schools.

In 1909 the Aboriginal Protection Act was passed. Under the Act, the Aboriginal Protection Board had the power to take custody of neglected Aboriginal children. Those taken into custody were sent to a number of training facilities established for Aboriginal people. Girls were trained in domestic skills at institution such as the Cootamundra Aboriginal Girls Home, boys were trained in agricultural skills at places such as Kinchela Aboriginal Boys Home and younger children were sent to the Bomaderry Children's Home.

This was the situation for Aboriginal people right up until the late 1950s and early 1960. There was effectively little in the way of education provided to Aboriginal children unless a local government school was able to tolerate the attendance of suitably "clean, decently clad" and polite Aboriginal students in their school. Cindy Berwick relates the story of one such "lucky" Aboriginal boy who attended Peakhurst Public School in the 1930s. This boy was bright and attained the award of Dux of the school only to have it withdrawn because he was Aboriginal. What education Aboriginal children were able to get was often in segregated Reserve schools, offering an often second rate education or in large Institutions concerned with domestic or labour training.

During the late 1940s and 1950s some small changes in the direction of Aboriginal education began to be seen:

- In 1949, a medical certificate was no longer required for aboriginal children to attend government schools;
- complaints about the second rate education at Reserve schools were heard and acted on;
- in 1956 the NSW school system welcomed its first Graduate Aboriginal teachers;
- in 1957, Tranby College Cooperative was established to provide training and education for Aboriginal people. The college became independent ion 1962 and was given government funding in 1982;
  - 1958 - 1965 NSW Teachers Federation took up the cause of Aboriginal education, opposing segregated schooling and funding a study of the conditions in Aboriginal schools. The findings notably pointed out the need for teacher training in Aboriginal education and commenting upon the disadvantage of Aboriginal children in the education system.

During the 1960s the Aboriginal Rights Movement gained further momentum and one well known event borne of this movement were the Freedom Rides of 1965. The bus tour headed by Charles Perkins and the Student Action for Aborigines group, travelled through country NSW with the intention of raising awareness of racism and discrimination experienced by aboriginal people, including in education.

The greatest incentive for the improvement of education for Aboriginal people in the 1960s was the referendum of 1967 after which Aboriginal people were recognised as Australian Citizens and the Commonwealth government had an increased role in provision of education for Aboriginal people. During the 1970s Aboriginal people became more involved in the education process with the creation of the position of Aboriginal teachers aid and the provision of training for the role. It also saw increased financial assistance to Aboriginal students through a program of scholarships.

=== NSW Aboriginal Education Consultative Group ===
==== 1970s ====
In 1975 the Schools Commission established the Aboriginal Consultative Group (ACG) to advise the Commission on Aboriginal Education issues. In 1976, the Schools Commission supported the establishment of state based Aboriginal Education Consultative Groups which were to advise their respective state Departments of Education.

The NSW AECG was formally established in 1977 under the leadership of Bob Morgan an old hand at agitating for improved Aboriginal education who, prior to heading NSW AECG, was on the National Aboriginal Education Committee. The NSW AECG's charter was to provide advice and recommendations on all issues of Aboriginal education to the NSW Department of Education. The NSW AECG, from the outset, worked closely with the Department's Aboriginal Education Unit which has been set up in 1975.

Early in its existence, Bob Morgan wanted the NSW AECG organisational structure to be unequivocally based in the community and to reflect community concerns and ideas. To this end a huge amount of work was undertaken by AECG pioneers, John Lester, Keith Hall, Joyce Woodberry Millie Butt (Ingram), Linda Burney, Lyn Reilly, Davina Tyrrell, Olive Mitchell, Evelyn Crawford and many others to establish local AECGs. These local AECGs brought their ideas and issues to a number of Regional AEGCs which in turn were represented in the peak body, the NSW AECG. It was a decidedly democratic, if at times, challenging structure. Today there are 130 local AECGs and 20 regional AECG which finally report to the NSW AEGC.

The first years of the NSW AECG were spent operating out of Bridge Street, and then Young Street, Sydney near the Department's Aboriginal Education Unit. By 1982, the Group had, in consultation with the Aboriginal Education Unit, developed the first NSW Aboriginal Education Policy. It was the first of Aboriginal Education Policy in Australia. The policy pinpointed the inclusion of Aboriginal communities and students in education as essential. It stressed that the education of Aboriginal children should confirm and celebrate their Aboriginal identity and it was accompanied by supporting documents to facilitate the teaching of Aboriginal Studies in schools.

==== 1980s ====
The implementation of the Aboriginal Education Policy preoccupied the NSW AECG for the next number of years. Some strategies supported by the NSW AECG to this end were to work with local AECGs to establish the Home School Liaison Program, the Aboriginal Education Agricultural Program and the Homework Centres initiative. By 1986, the Department made the adoption of the Aboriginal Education Policy mandatory in government schools.

Other work achieved by the NSW AECG in its first decade of operation included research on OA classes, overwhelmingly populated with Aboriginal students at the time. This led to the development of the Aboriginal Early Literacy Program and extra literacy teachers in schools. Much work was done to support local AECGs including the publication of newsletters and other guidelines for gaining project funding and organisation operations. The NSW AECG also provided assistance in the establishment of Tertiary Preparation Courses at Tranby College, Aboriginal Units at major Tertiary Institutions.

In 1987 Linda Burney, the first Aboriginal graduate from the Mitchel College of Advanced Education, was elected as NSW AECG President. Burney began her career as a teacher and later worked in the Department's Aboriginal Education Unit and then as Executive Officer for the NSW AECG. Since 2003 Burney has represented Canterbury in the NSW Legislative Assembly and has undertaken numerous portfolios in the Keneally ministry and is currently Deputy Leader of the Opposition and shadow Minister for Aboriginal Affairs.

==== 1990s ====
In 1990 the AECG moved from Young Street, to their current premises at 37 Cavendish Street, Stanmore. This represented a move back to the community and an assertion of the NSW AECG independence and community based identity. Also in 1990 the NSW AECG put in another strategic effort to remain a truly community based organisation. It began the process of becoming an incorporated body. Its constitution ensured the continued input of local AECGs and specialist units which all report to the Annual Conference.

Through the encouragement of the NSW AECG, the Education Department's commitment to the aims of the Aboriginal Education policy, pioneered in 1982, was enshrined in law under the Education Reform Act which set out that 100 hours of Australian History and 100 hours of Australian Geography for years 7-10. The Aboriginal perspectives on these subjects were clearly implemented under a newly funded Aboriginal Curriculum Unit of a newly established New South Wales Board of Studies. The NSW AECG was also critical in developing the curriculum and the resources to support the studies. Appropriate curricula were implemented in the following year.

Much of the NSW AECG "a work at this time was to review the Aboriginal Education Policy so as to focus on educating all students in NSW schools about Aboriginal history and culture. The review began in 1992 and by 1996 the document was rewritten and entitled " All Students - All Staff - All Schools' reflecting the Department's commitment to Aboriginal education in NSW.

Other NSW AECG triumphs during the 1990s included being handed the chair and funding to run the National Aboriginal and Torres Strait Islanders Strategic Planning and monitoring Group and also an integral coordinating role in the campaign to raise awareness of the effects of "Glue Ear". This disease affected many Aboriginal children and severely impacted their chances in the education system.

A "domestic" landmark for the NSW AECG in the 1990s was the transfer of the title of the building at 37 Cavendish Street from the, soon to close, Inner City Education Centre Cooperative to the NSW AECG.

In 1998 Charles Davison was elected as President of the Group. At this time the NSW AECG were heavily involved in the development of the K–6 HSIE syllabus which included mandatory Aboriginal Studies material and was completed in 1998 as were amendments to the 7–10 History and Geography syllabus to reflect Aboriginal experience. In 1998 also the AECG launched the innovative "Interim Aboriginal Languages and Framework" and the accompanying implementation documents "Making a Difference", a project completed in collaboration with the Department of Education and Training.

==== 2000s and beyond ====
The next decade saw two more new Presidents. In 2004, David Ella was elected President of the organisation and then in 2008, the present incumbent Cindy Berwick, took over the reins. Since the year 2000 there have been a great many achievements for the AECG. Perhaps the most significant of these began with the 2003 announcement of a review of Aboriginal Education in NSW, of Aboriginal Education Policy and of the Aboriginal Programs Unit by the Deputy Premier and Education and Training Minister, Andrew Refshauge and President, Charles Davison.

The NSW AECG was well represented on the Review Reference Group, with President, Charles Davison joining the then Deputy Director General Dr. Alan Laughlin as co chairpersons along with other members of the organisation. The work of finding ways to implement the 71 recommendations coming out of the Review fell to NSW AECG and Department of Education and Training and by 2005 the report of the Review, "Freeing the Spirit, Dreaming an Equal Future" was published and lauded as a successful example of the partnership between the AECG and Department of Education and Training.

The organisational structure of the NSW AECG posed numerous challenges to those who were elected to the role of President by the membership of the organisation. The elected President was an employee of the then New South Wales Office of the Board of Studies, Chairperson of the then Executive and Chief Executive Officer of the Stanmore Secretariat. At this time a total of five positions, based at Stanmore were funded by State Treasury and were incumbered with dual responsibilities to the organisation and government.

In recent years the NSW AECG has successfully advised the government on ways to improve NAPLAN results for Aboriginal student, running cultural immersion programs for new teachers, undertaking a curriculum audit and planning and implementing a framework for teaching Aboriginal languages in schools. The Partnership between NSW AECG and the Department has been renewed with attention paid to the work done with TAFE NSW. Another important involvement for the NSW AECG has been to the debate over the "Australian Curriculum" and the Commonwealth governments other proposal, the Indigenous Early Development Index.

== Description ==
Garden

The building is located well-set back from the street on a suburban land parcel the width of which is 18 metres and the length, 60 metres. The front garden retains a number of tall cabbage palm trees (Livistona australis) which may date from the early years of the residence's establishment. The back garden is a large grassed space that is used for barbeques from time to time.

House

The NSW Aboriginal Education Consultative Group office is housed in a free standing Italianate Victorian terrace of three levels. The external facade has some modifications from the original, the most noticeable being the enclosure of the level 2 balcony which occurred when the house was converted to two flats. It recently has had a carport erected on the western side of the building. Behind this lies a disused external staircase that was used to access the up stairs flat with the house was converted into flats.

Internally the down stairs layout of the house is substantially intact with only minor alterations to the rooms at the rear. The rooms at the rear include kitchen facilities, a meeting room and office space . The front parlour is currently used as reception and accommodates the Office Manager, the Secretariat and the Curriculum Resources Officer. A timber staircase leads to an office space and a bathroom on the first floor. The Office spaces open onto a deck, which has been added in recent years.

A short flight of stairs leads to the next level which gives access to two more offices and beyond that the covered in balcony which is used for resource storage. This level also has a recently modified space comprising a split-level resources space and meeting rooms the latter of which leads down to the level one deck. The resource space has been set up to house a library of NSW AECG education resources produced over the years of its operation.

The building contains many of its original decorative features including its Victorian patterned ceilings, architraves, doors and many original windows. The front door still has its etched glass feature windows and fan-light. The stairs are the original Victorian style timber staircase.

=== Condition ===
As at 14 May 2015, good.

== Heritage listing ==
As at 7 August 2015, The Aboriginal Education Consultative Group (AECG) office and Records is of state heritage significance as the office and working core of the peak Aboriginal Education body in NSW. The NSW AECG has historically turned the tide on the exclusion of Aboriginal people from European education and provided the first NSW Aboriginal Education Policy, support materials and actions to be produced and mandated in NSW schools. This policy was in fact the first Aboriginal Education Policy to be developed in Australia.

The state heritage significance of the NSW AECG office and Records in Stanmore is enhanced through its association with the NSW AECG, the community based and democratic organisation that has worked tirelessly to make the Aboriginal community's voice heard loud and strong in the NSW educational system. The state heritage significance of the item also derives from association with numerous important Aboriginal education activists and leading figures in the NSW Aboriginal community.

The NSW AECG office and Records is of social significance at a state level for its special association with the Aboriginal community across NSW. This is expressed in the structure of the organisation which ensures that local Aboriginal people have a say in the education of their children through local AECGs which in turn report ideas and information through regional AECG and finally to the peak AECG situated at the Cavendish Property. The inclusiveness is expressed through modifications to the building to accommodate meetings of statewide representatives and access to resources for those involved in education all over NSW. Its location away from the education bureaucracy reinforces it independence and community base. The NSW AECG office and records is a rare example of a building which is the home of the peak organization concerned with Aboriginal Education in NSW. The combined physical resources, organisation minutes, reports and educational resource documents housed there represents a significant research resource on the history of Aboriginal education in NSW.

NSW Aboriginal Education Consultative Group Office was listed on the New South Wales State Heritage Register on 19 January 2018 having satisfied the following criteria.

The place is important in demonstrating the course, or pattern, of cultural or natural history in New South Wales.

The Aboriginal Education Consultative Group Office is of state heritage significance as the office and working core of the peak Aboriginal Education body in NSW. The NSW AECG has historically turned the tide on the exclusion of Aboriginal people from European education and provided the first NSW Aboriginal Education Policy, support materials and actions to be produced and mandated in NSW schools. This policy was in fact the first Education Policy to be developed in Australia. The policy, which has been refined over the years since 1982 when it was first produced, aims to ensure that Aboriginal students are included in European education and given a fighting chance of achieving equal education outcomes as white students. The work of the NSW AECG, the apex of the community based peak Aboriginal Education organisation in NSW, based at 37 Cavendish Street, is ongoing.

The place has a strong or special association with a person, or group of persons, of importance of cultural or natural history of New South Wales's history.

The state heritage significance of the NSW AECG office in Stanmore is enhanced through its association with the NSW AECG, the community based and democratic organisation that has worked tirelessly to make the Aboriginal community's voice heard loud and strong in the NSW educational system. The NSW AECG has, through its community-inclusive structure provided relevant advice to the education community on the best ways to include Aboriginal Students in education and improve Aboriginal students educational outcomes. This advice and research was encompassed in the first NSW Aboriginal Education Policy to be produced and mandated in NSW schools. It has also been at the forefront of providing all students with strong and valuable Aboriginal perspectives in curriculum areas, especially History, Geography and Aboriginal Studies. The work of the NSW AECG as a conduit between the Aboriginal Community and the Education Community is ongoing as is their work in providing support and resources to strengthen the Aboriginal perspective across education in NSW. The premises at 37 Cavendish have facilitated the work of the organisation and has been adapted to provide for the needs of the community based organisation as evidenced in the modelling of large meeting rooms and resource spaces which accommodate representative and educators from across NSW. Its location away from the education bureaucracy reinforces its independence and community base.

It is likely that the state heritage significance of the item also derives from association with numerous important Aboriginal education activists and leading figures in the community.

The place is important in demonstrating aesthetic characteristics and/or a high degree of creative or technical achievement in New South Wales.

The item is likely to be of local heritage significance as a fine example of a Victorian free standing house in its garden setting dating from the period of the early development of suburban Stanmore.

The place has a strong or special association with a particular community or cultural group in New South Wales for social, cultural or spiritual reasons.

The NSW AECG office is of social significance at a state level for its special association with the Aboriginal Community across NSW. This is expressed in the structure of the organisation which ensures that local Aboriginal people have a say in the education of their children through local AECGs which in turn report ideas and information through regional AECG and finally to the peak AECG situated at the Cavendish Property. The inclusiveness is expressed through modifications to the building with accommodates meetings of statewide representatives and access to resources for those involved in education all over NSW.

The place has potential to yield information that will contribute to an understanding of the cultural or natural history of New South Wales.

The NSW AECG office is of state heritage significance as the combined physical resources, organization minutes, reports and educational resource documents housed there represents a significant research resource on the history of Aboriginal education in NSW. The place itself which has been modified to accommodate the community based-consultative organisation provides information on the structure and growth of the organisation

== See also ==
- Australian residential architectural styles
