= Stanmore, New South Wales =

Stanmore
- Suburb
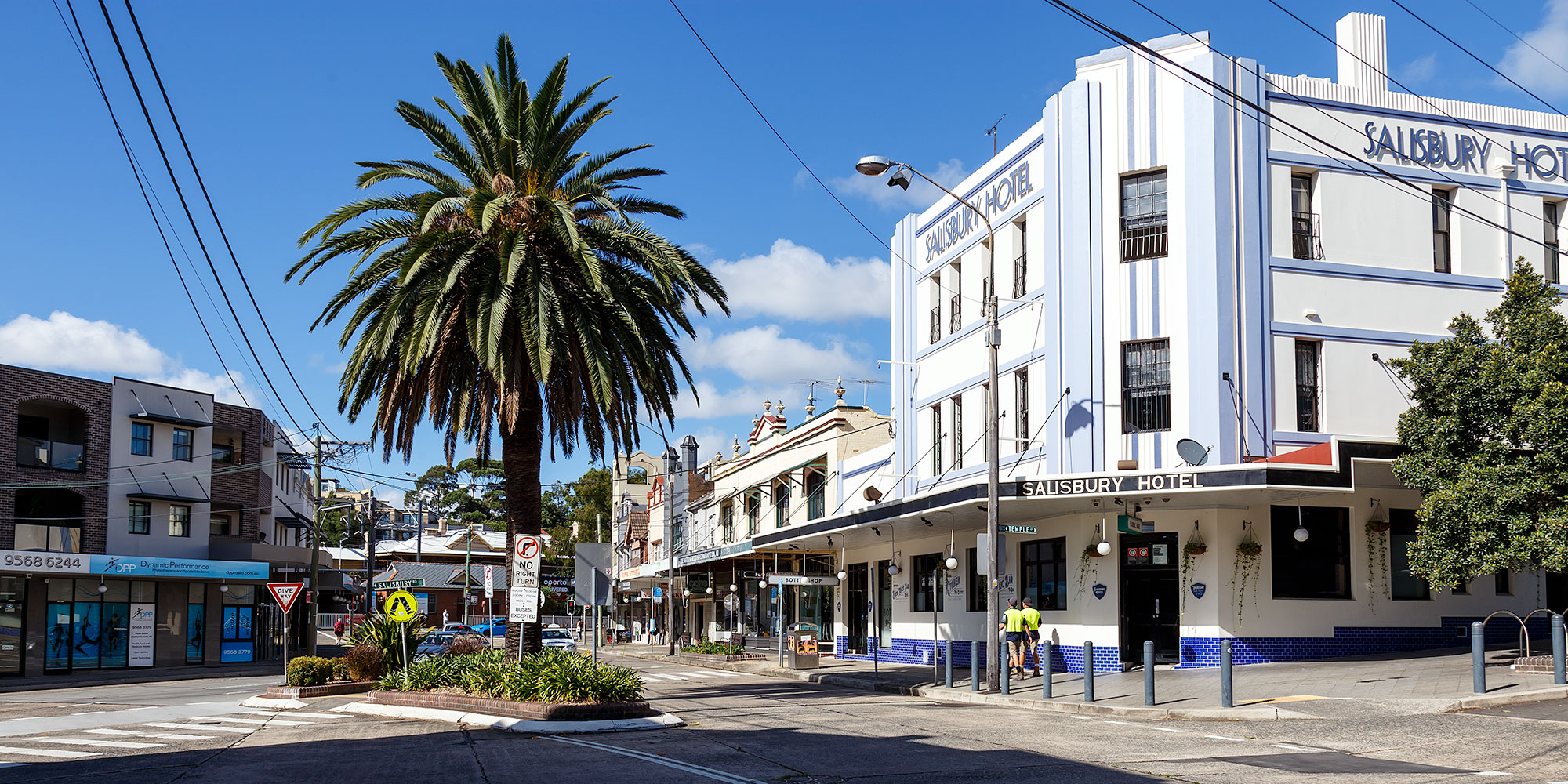
- Percival Road

- Interactive map of Stanmore
- Country: Australia
- State: New South Wales
- City: Sydney
- LGA: Inner West Council
- Location: 3 km (1.9 mi) south west of Sydney CBD

Government
  - State electorate: Newtown
  - Federal division: Grayndler

Area
  - Total: 1.22 km^{2} (0.47 sq mi)
- Elevation: 38 m (125 ft)

Population
  - Total: 7,619 (2021 census)
  - Density: 6,245/km^{2} (16,170/sq mi)
- Postcode: 2048
Suburbs around Stanmore
Leichhardt	Annandale	Camperdown
Petersham	Stanmore	Newtown
Petersham	Marrickville	Enmore

Stanmore is a suburb in the Inner West of Sydney, in New South Wales, Australia 3 kilometres south west of the Sydney central business district. It is part of the local government area of the Inner West Council. It is known for its long strip of shops running along Parramatta Road (Great Western Highway).

== History ==
Stanmore was named by a saddler, John Jones, who settled on the land in 1835 where Newington College now stands and called it the Stanmore Estate. Jones named it after his birthplace of Stanmore, now a north-west suburb of London. Thomas Rowley owned Kingston Farm which occupied the eastern half of Stanmore and much of Newtown, and a portion of George Johnston's Annandale Farm estate covered the area south of Parramatta Road containing Annandale House built in 1799 on the hill between Macaulay and Albany Roads. Johnston marched from here with his troops to Castle Hill on 5 March 1804 to quell the convict revolt. He also rode from here on 26 January 1808 to arrest Governor William Bligh during the Rum Rebellion. Johnston planted the first Norfolk pines on the Australian mainland along the line of Percival Road, leading to Parramatta Road.

Stanmore Road was constructed in 1835 and early development occurred in this area. In 1855, the railway divided Stanmore into areas known as North and West Kingston north of the railway, and South Kingston south of the railway. The Kingston Farm had been sold to James Holt in 1835, and North Kingston was subdivided in 1854. South Kingston (between the railway and Stanmore Road) was slowly subdivided from 1857 with isolated large houses built between 1860 and 1870. It was not until the late 19th century that the name Stanmore came into more regular use, replacing Kingston. Municipal boundaries established in 1861 and 1871 placed most of Stanmore into the Municipality of Petersham, with the area south of Stanmore Rd placed into the Municipality of Marrickville. In 1878, Stanmore railway station was established and the streets west of Percival Road were laid out. More intensive development subsequently occurred in this area and the name Stanmore slowly moved northwards from Stanmore to Parramatta Roads. Stanmore became a desirable location, booming in the 1880s and 1890s with the opening of Newington College and the Percival Road shopping area. The naming of streets after English colonies between Derby and Stafford streets reflected the English values of the time. The final subdivision of Johnston's South Annandale estate took place in 1905, and building was not completed until 1916-1918. Annandale House was demolished in 1905, and Weekley Park was established on land donated by the Johnston family.

A small amount of light industry was established in the early 1920s in the area close to Parramatta Road, including H. Small and Co., a chocolate maker opening in 1928, and Starkeys Cordials. Both establishments have since closed and their premises have been converted into offices and apartments.

== Heritage listings ==
Stanmore has several heritage-listed sites, including:

- 37 Cavendish Street: New South Wales Aboriginal Education Consultative Group Office
- 125 Corunna Road: Corunna Road Sewer Vent and Cottage
- Great Southern and Western railway: Stanmore railway station

== Population ==
In the 2016 census, there were 7,938 people living in Stanmore, while in the 2011 census the number was 7,702.

In the 2021 census, Stanmore had a population of 7,619 people, 68.3% of whom were born in Australia. The next most common countries of birth were England 4.6%, New Zealand 2.1%, Portugal 1.4%, China (excludes SARs and Taiwan) 1.2% and Greece 1.2%. The most common responses for religion in Stanmore (NSW) were No Religion, 54.0%, Catholic 18.9%, Not stated 5.2%, Anglican 6.0% and Eastern Orthodox 4.6%. 76% of households only spoke English at home. 25.4% of households were non-English speaking. The top responses for languages used at home (other than English) were Greek 2.5% Spanish 1.9% Italian 1.8% Portuguese 1.6% and Mandarin 1.5%.

== Commercial area and transport ==
Stanmore railway station is on the Leppington & Inner West Line and the Liverpool & Inner West Line of the Sydney Trains network. Stanmore has a small shopping centre beside Stanmore railway station. Commercial developments also run along the length of Parramatta Road.

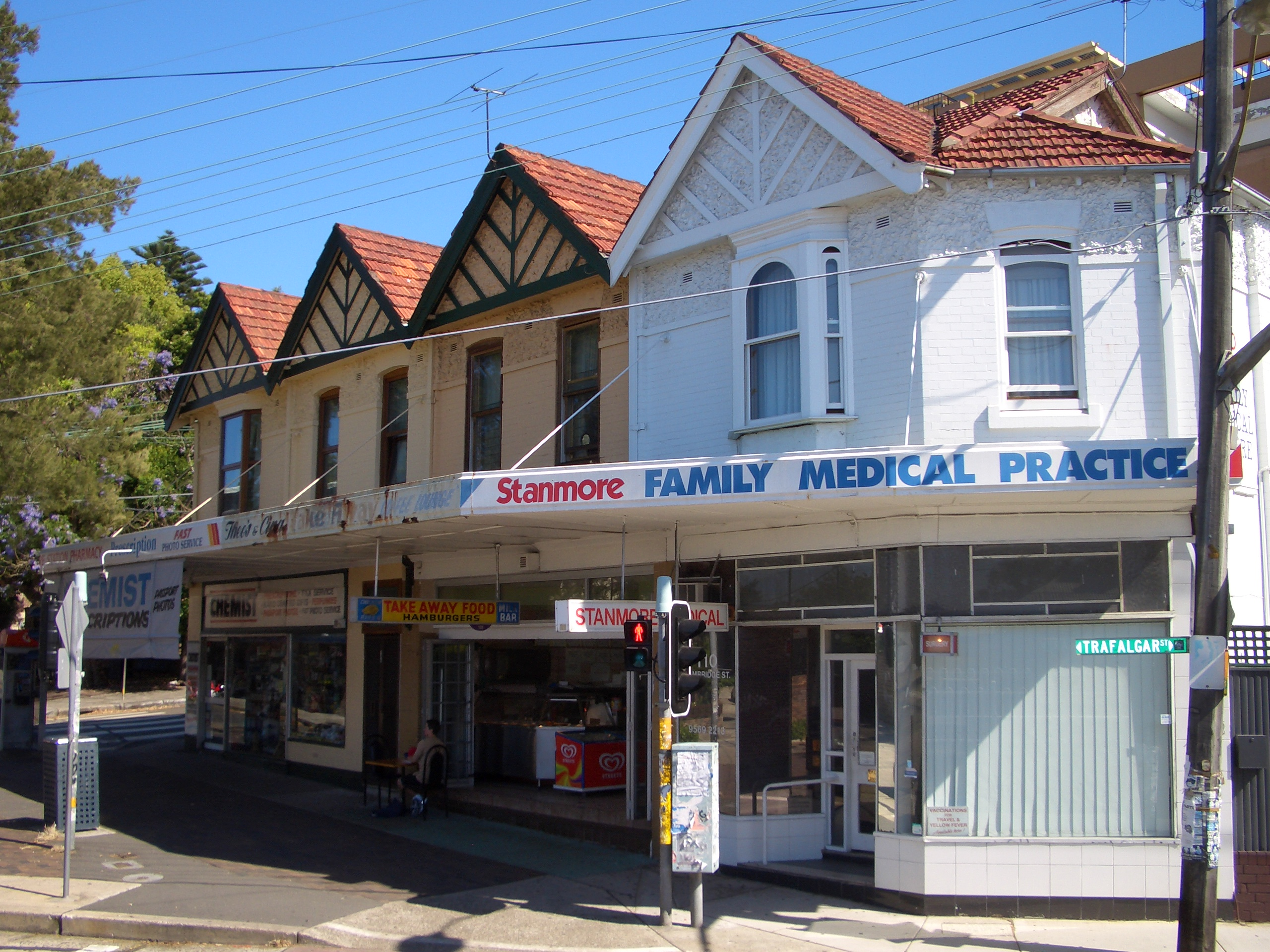
Trafalgar Street shops

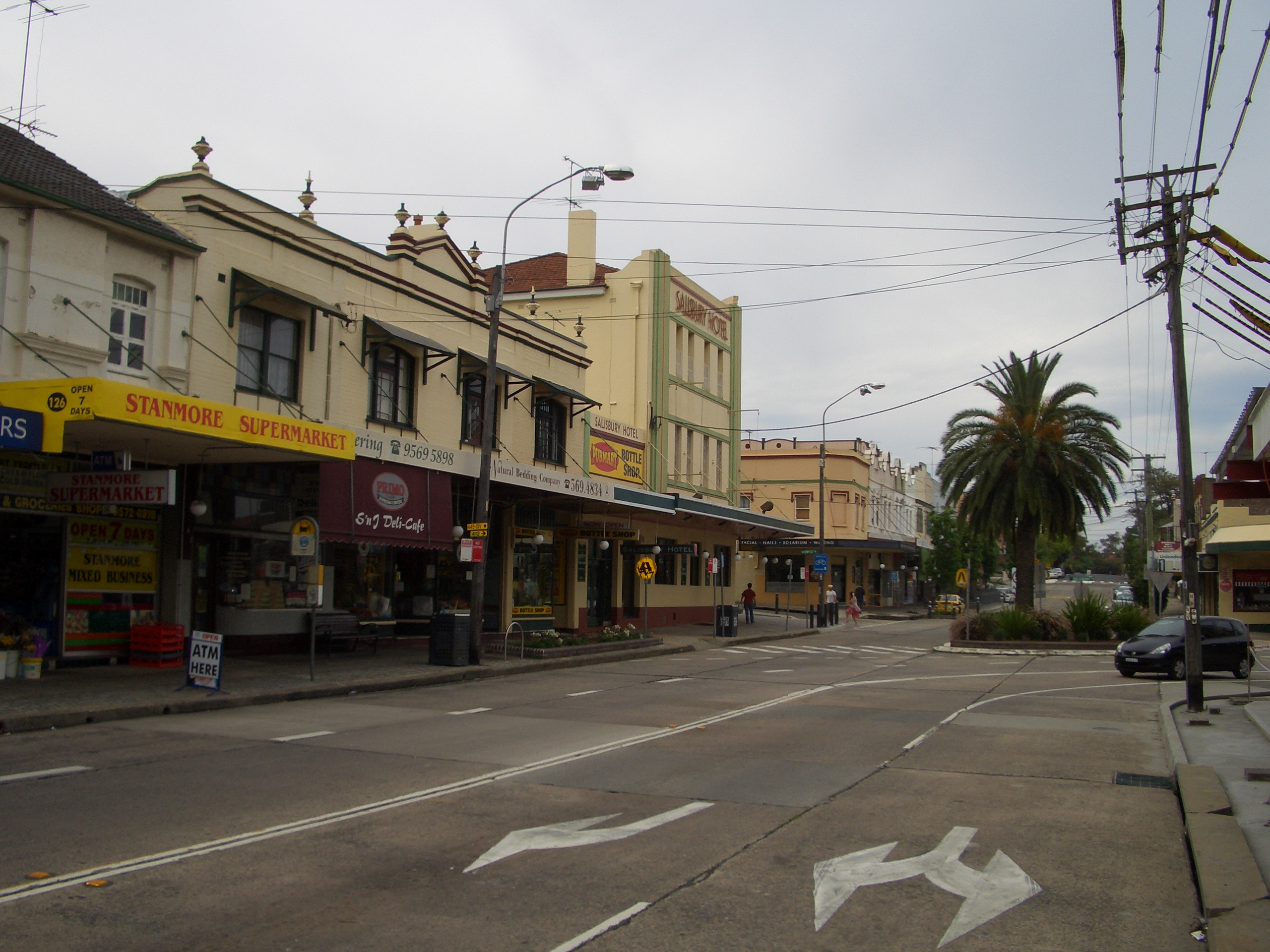
Percival Road shops

== Schools ==
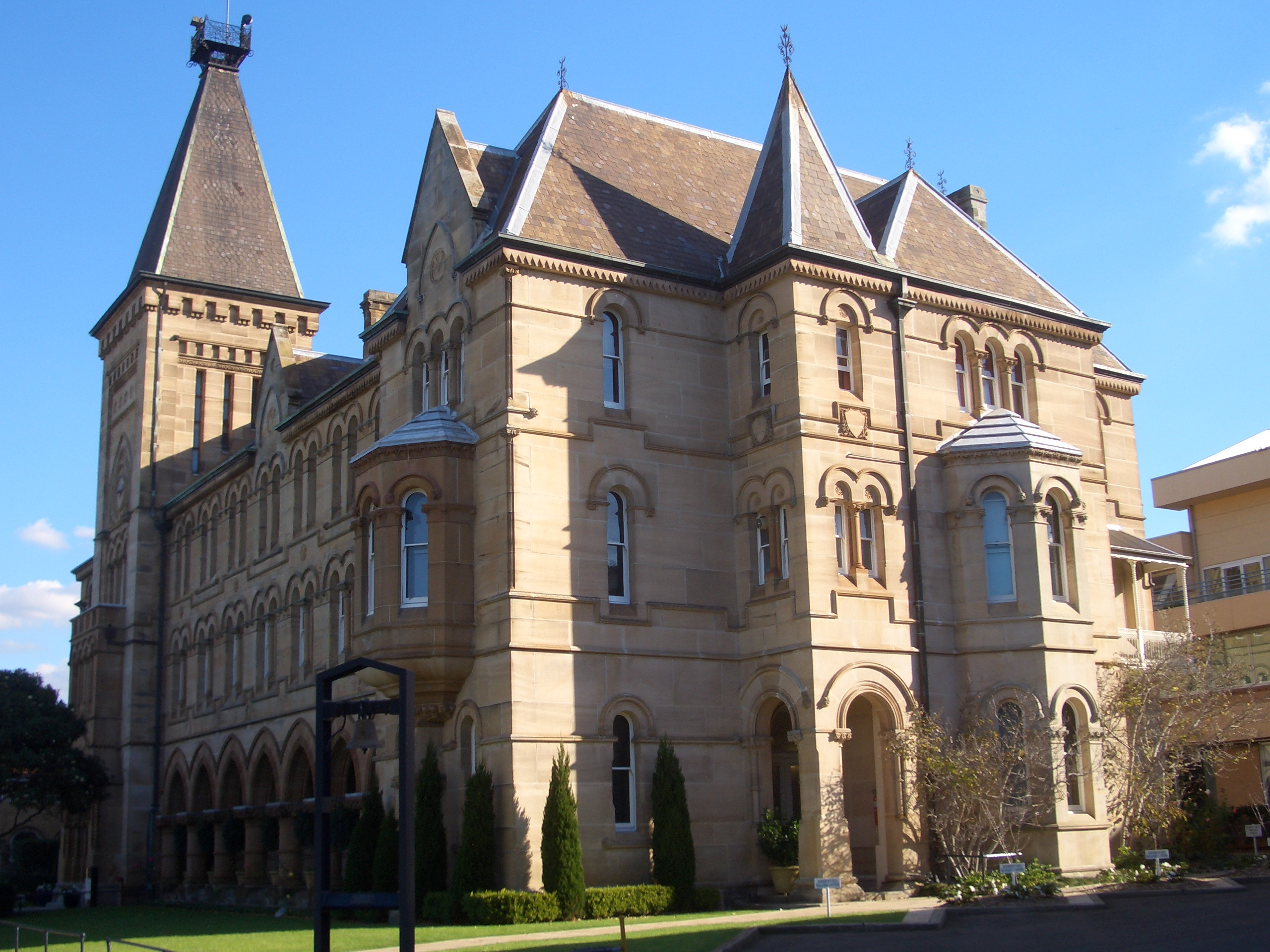
Founders' Wing, Newington College by Thomas Rowe

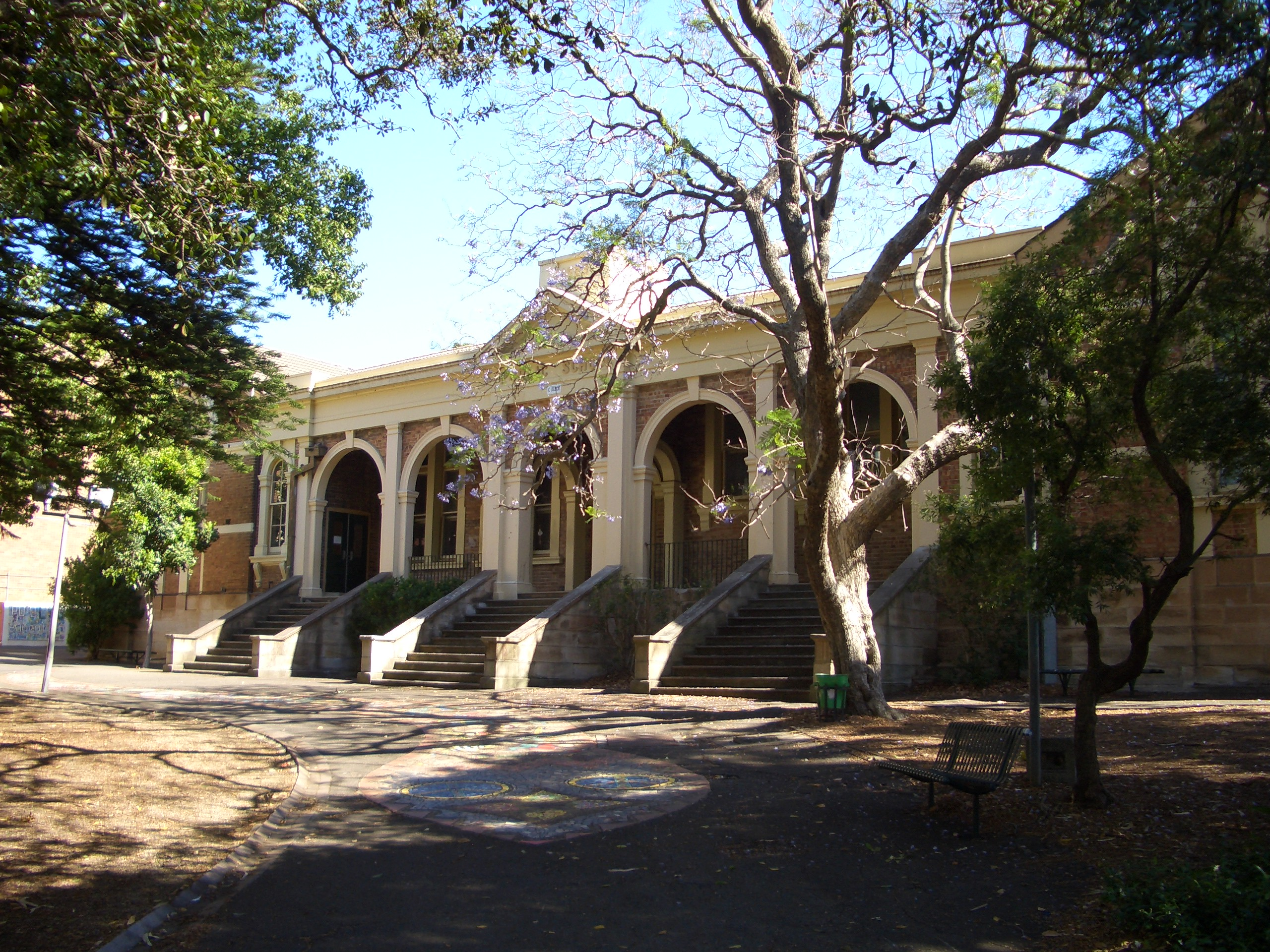
Stanmore Public School by Blackmann and Parkes

Stanmore is home to Newington College, an independent GPS boys school, the state primary Stanmore Public School, and Saint Michael's Catholic Primary School Stanmore.

Both Newington and Stanmore Public are of heritage significance and the main buildings of distinguished designs. Of Newington's design by Thomas Rowe the architectural historian Morton Herman said:

The 1881 building is an almost perfect example of scholastic Gothic Revival architecture.

Of Stanmore Public School's design by Blackmann and Parkes Herman said:

... the whole building is a very pleasant essay in correct and simple classicism, with the triple stairs giving unexpected dignity.

== Sport and recreation ==
Apart from the private facilities at Newington College, sporting and recreation facilities in Stanmore are limited to a handful of small parks and playgrounds including Weekley Park, Crammond Park and Montague Gardens. Stanmore does lend its name, however, to the Stanmore Hawks soccer club which plays in the NSW State League Division One, the third tier of senior soccer in Sydney.

== Churches ==
Churches in Stanmore include St Michael The Archangel Catholic Church, and Stanmore Baptist Church.

== Notable people ==
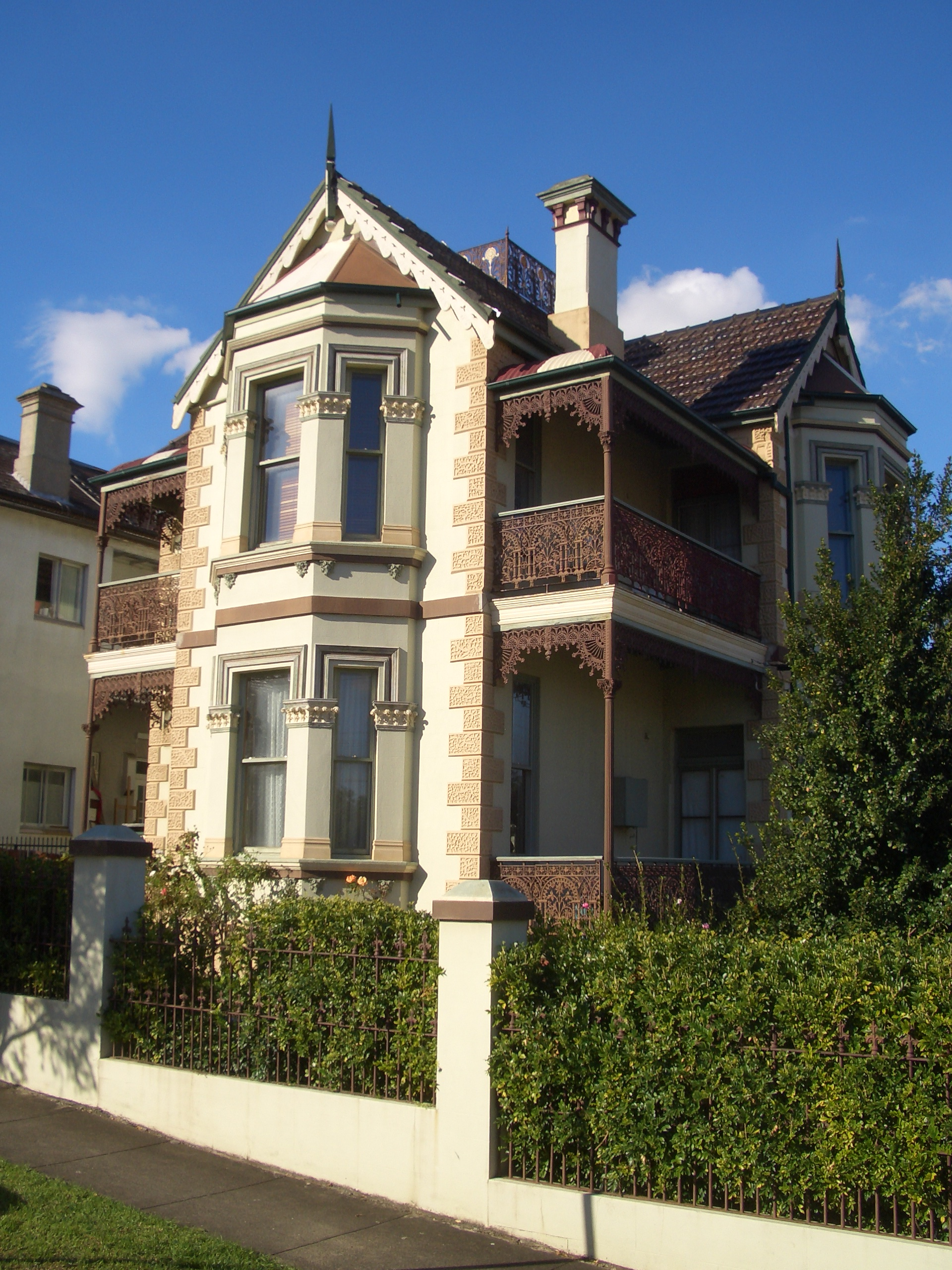
John Gowing's home Lyndhurst Middleton Street, Stanmore

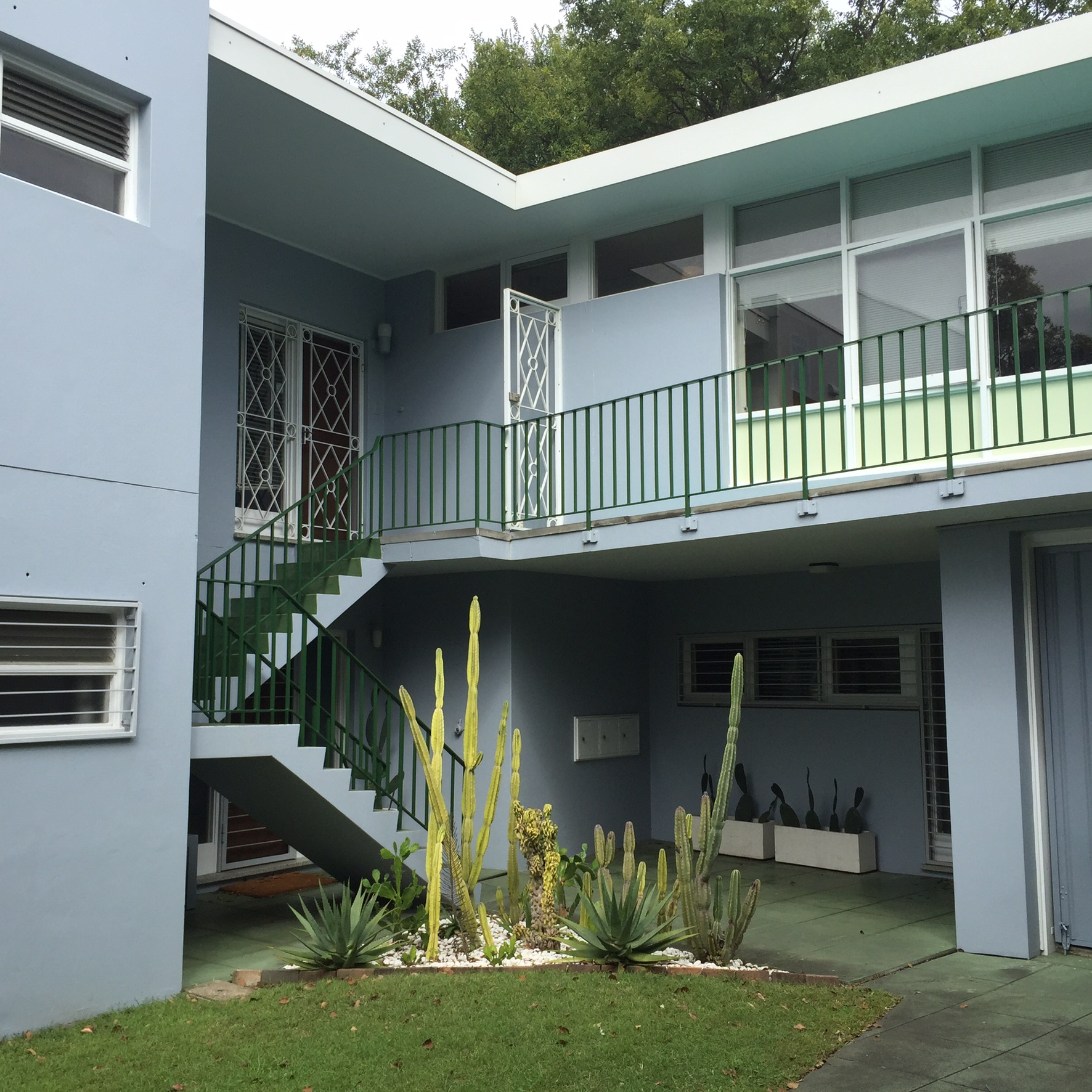
May Hollinworth’s, home a block of apartments Hollinworth Cambridge Street, Stanmore

Notable people from or who have lived in Stanmore include:

- Sid Barnes (1916–1973), Test cricketer
- Sir Garfield Barwick (1903–1997), 7th Chief Justice of Australia, raised in Stanmore
- Vivian Gordon Bowden (1884–1942), businessman and diplomat, born in Stanmore
- Euphemia Bridges Bowes (1816–1900), suffragette and social activist, lived in Stanmore
- Nicholas Brown (b. 1980), actor, singer-songwriter, screenwriter Stanmore
- Noelene Brown OAM (b. 1938), actress & comedian, lived in Stanmore, attended Stanmore Public School
- Matt Doran (b. 1976), actor
- Thelma Forshaw (1923–1995), writer, journalist, attended St Michael's Catholic School
- Tom Frame (b.1962), Anglican bishop, historian, academic, born in Stanmore
- Richard Gill AO (1941−2018), Conductor and musical education advocate lived in Stanmore
- John Gowing (1835–1908), Gowings founder, lived in Stanmore, and 4 sons attended Newington College
- William Parker Henson (1905–1999), Chairman Sydney County Council, born in Stanmore, attended Newington College
- May Hollinworth (1895–1968), theatre producer and director, lived in Stanmore
- Harold Holt (1908–1967), 17th Prime Minister of Australia, born in Stanmore
- Sir Asher Joel KBE, AO (1912—1998), was born in Stanmore
- Amy Mathews (b.1979), Home and Away actress
- Gwen Plumb (1912–2002), actress, born in Stanmore
- Leigh Sales (b. 1973), ABC Journalist
- Frank Stanmore (1929−2005), rugby league player, lived in Stanmore
- C. James Tinsley had charge of the Baptist church for 44 years
- Dr Alice Whitley MBE (1913–1990), Headmistress, born in Stanmore
