= Tinsel town =

Tinsel town, Tinseltown, Tinsel Town or Tinsel-Town may refer to:

== Film industry ==
- Hollywood, Los Angeles, California, a neighborhood associated with the U.S. film industry
  - Cinema of the United States generally
- Film Nagar, a neighborhood in Hyderabad, Telangana, India, notable as a home of Telugu cinema

== Music ==
- “Tinseltown in the Rain”, a 1984 song by The Blue Nile
- "Tinseltown", a 1988 song by Spear of Destiny off the album The Price You Pay
- "Tinsel Town", a 1994 single by Ronny Jordan
- "Tinsel Town", a 1999 song by Feeder off the album Yesterday Went Too Soon
- "Tinseltown", a 2000 Christmas song by SHeDAISY off the album Brand New Year
- "Tinsel Town", a 2003 song by Seal off the album Seal IV
- "Tinsel Town", a 2004 song by Ash off the album Meltdown (Ash album)
- "Tinsel Town", a 2008 song by Jellyfish off the album Catnip Dynamite
- Tinsel Town, a 2012 Christmas album by Jimmy Rankin
- "Tinseltown", a 2017 track by Leyland Kirby off the album We, So Tired of All the Darkness in Our Lives

== Other topics ==
- Tinsel Town (TV series), a 2000 BBC TV series about fictional night club "Tinsel Town"
- Tinseltown: Murder, Morphine, and Madness at the Dawn of Hollywood, a 2004 book by William J. Mann
- Tinseltown, a 2007 film by The Jim Henson Company
- Tinsel Town (film), a Christmas film directed by Chris Foggin
- TinselTown, a brand of candles sold in Ireland and Scotland by O-Pee-Chee
- Tinseltown, temporary Christmastime name for Castletown railway station on the Isle of Man

== See also ==
- Tinsel (disambiguation)
