= Tinsel (disambiguation) =

Tinsel is a metallic material used for ornamentation, notably including Christmas decorations.

Tinsel may also refer to:

- Tinsel (codename), a type of radio jamming equipment used during World War II
- Tinsel (film), a 1918 silent film drama
- Tinsel (novel), a 1979 novel by William Goldman
- Tinsel (TV series), a Nigerian soap opera
- Tinsel Dome, a small hill in Antarctica
- Tinsel Korey (born 1980), Canadian actress
- Tinsel, a member of the original Exiles

== See also ==
- Tinsel print, a rare type of old master print parts
- Tinsel town (disambiguation)
- Tinsel wire, a form of low-voltage electrical wire
- Tinselfish, a family of fish
- Calectasia, commonly called the tinsel lily
- Catapaecilma elegans or common tinsel, a species of butterfly
- Tensile
- Tinshill, a suburb north of Leeds, West Yorkshire
- Tinsley (disambiguation)
