= Corunna Road Sewer Vent and Cottage =

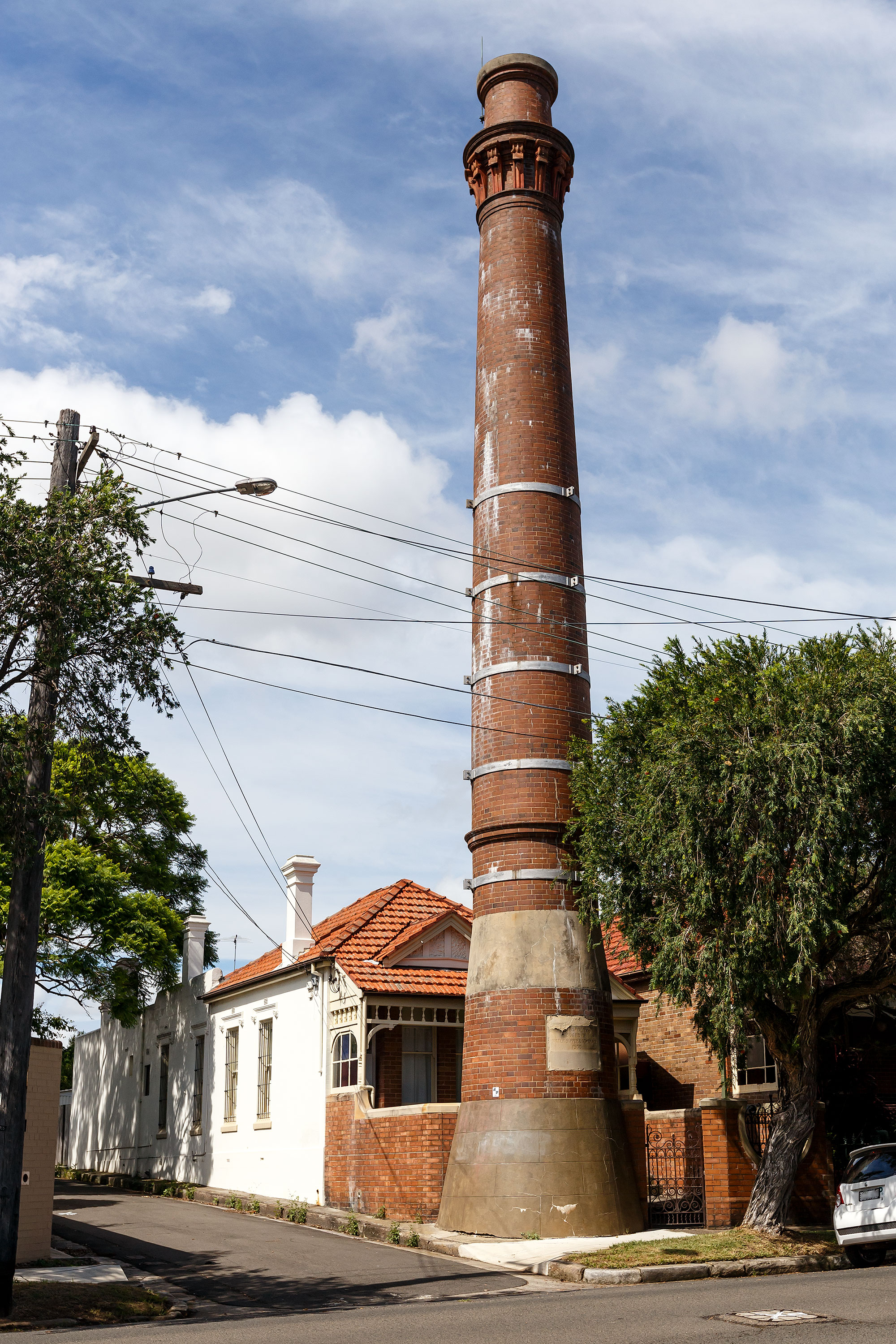
- Corunna Road Sewer Vent and Cottage, 2019

- Location within Sydney Location within Australia
- 33.8894°S 151.1645°E
- Location: 125 Corunna Road, Stanmore, Inner West Council, Sydney, New South Wales, Australia

History
- Built: 1900–1900

Site notes
- Architect: Public Works Department
- Owner: Sydney Water

New South Wales Heritage Register
- Official name: Sewer Vent and Cottage; Corunna Road Sewer Vent and Cottages
- Type: state heritage (built)
- Designated: 15 November 2002
- Reference no.: 1635
- Type: Other - Utilities - Sewerage
- Category: Utilities - Sewerage
- Builders: Public Works Department

Corunna Road Sewer Vent and Cottage is a heritage-listed sewer vent and residence at 125 Corunna Road, Stanmore, New South Wales, a suburb of Sydney, Australia. It was designed by the NSW Public Works Department and built by the department in 1900. It was added to the New South Wales State Heritage Register on 15 November 2002.

== History ==
The sewer vent and cottage were built in 1900.

The Corunna Road site is one of only two sewer vents in New South Wales to feature accommodation facilities. The cottage was originally leased to Water Board employees responsible for the maintenance of the vent.

The cottage was renovated by Sydney Water as part of the Heritage Assets Project, which saw the demolition of the dilapidated rear kitchen, and the installation of a new contemporary kitchen, hallway, dining room, laundry and bathroom. It also saw a new skillion roof installed at the rear of the cottage, new walls, floor and ceiling, French doors, services, and the restoration of the yard.

The cottage was sold at auction by Sydney Water in 2017 for $1,405,000. The adjacent sewer vent remains owned by Sydney Water following the cottage sale.

== Description ==
The structure comprises a brick and terracotta detailed vent shaft with rendered base and cap some 15 metres in height. With the adjoining Queen Anne revival workers cottage, the vent is integral to the design of the place as it forms part of the front fence in brick and stone detailing with wrought iron gates and fence pickets. Construction details are substantially intact.

The cottage comprises a single storey detached dwelling with all original details in generally including turned timber verandah posts and verandah detail; Timber joinery; and Marseilles pattern terracotta tiles, all of which appears to be substantially intact.

Further original details of the cottage include a rendered and lined ashlar wall to the side lane and rendered label moulds above the window heads. Evidence of shutters via shutter flaps remain but shutters have been removed. The cottage backs on to a rear lane which is fenced by a timber paling fence in fair to poor condition.

Relatively new steel straps have been fitted to the shaft for stability which has some impact on the visual aesthetics of the shaft, however the quality and detailing of the shaft remains as an excellent example of the brick masons craft complete with entasis. What sets this shaft apart from others is the neo-classical terracotta console brackets at the capital of the shaft which is an excellent detail and example of its type.

The stone detail on the shaft is inscribed "Metropolitan Board of Water Supply and Sewerage 1900" and is in itself in poor condition continuing to exfoliate.

The vent and cottage are located on the corner of a lane, and the vent is a prominent landmark within the local vicinity, particularly to the east along Corunna Road.

== Heritage listing ==
The vent and cottage are an increasingly rare survivor of an excellent example of the brick and stonemasons craft associated with Sydney Water in the early part of the 20th century. It is one of a handful of like structures in the Sydney Water System, and in comparison to other similar examples is of State significance. It is a visual landmark in the cultural landscape of the local area.

Sewer Vent and Cottage was listed on the New South Wales State Heritage Register on 15 November 2002 having satisfied the following criteria.

The place is important in demonstrating the course, or pattern, of cultural or natural history in New South Wales.

The vent and cottage are tangible evidence of the historical provision of sewerage services to the inner Western Suburbs of Sydney which form part of a much grander sewage system. The vent with the cottage as a couple are rare evidence of the historical values of quality design and facilities for Board workers and the Board itself.

The place is important in demonstrating aesthetic characteristics and/or a high degree of creative or technical achievement in New South Wales.

A highly visible landmark with rare terracotta detailing. It is a prominent element and one which relates well to its historic streetscape.

The place has strong or special association with a particular community or cultural group in New South Wales for social, cultural or spiritual reasons.

It is likely to be of value to the members of local community as a prominent landmark and for the function it serves in provision of sewerage services for the community.

The place has potential to yield information that will contribute to an understanding of the cultural or natural history of New South Wales.

An excellent example of brick masons trade in the precision of such detail including entasis of the shaft. The vent shaft plays an important technical role in the provision of fresh air for the system and as such is a highly significant element to the sewer system.

The place possesses uncommon, rare or endangered aspects of the cultural or natural history of New South Wales.

As a combination of cottage and vent shaft this example is one of a couple in Sydney Water System and in the detail displayed probably unique in NSW. The vent shaft itself is one of a group of like shafts built by the Board at the time which collectively

The place is important in demonstrating the principal characteristics of a class of cultural or natural places/environments in New South Wales.

The cottage in overall design is representative of Queen Anne detail buildings of a good quality throughout Sydney.
