= Stanmore railway station, Sydney =

Railway station in Sydney, New South Wales, Australia

Stanmore
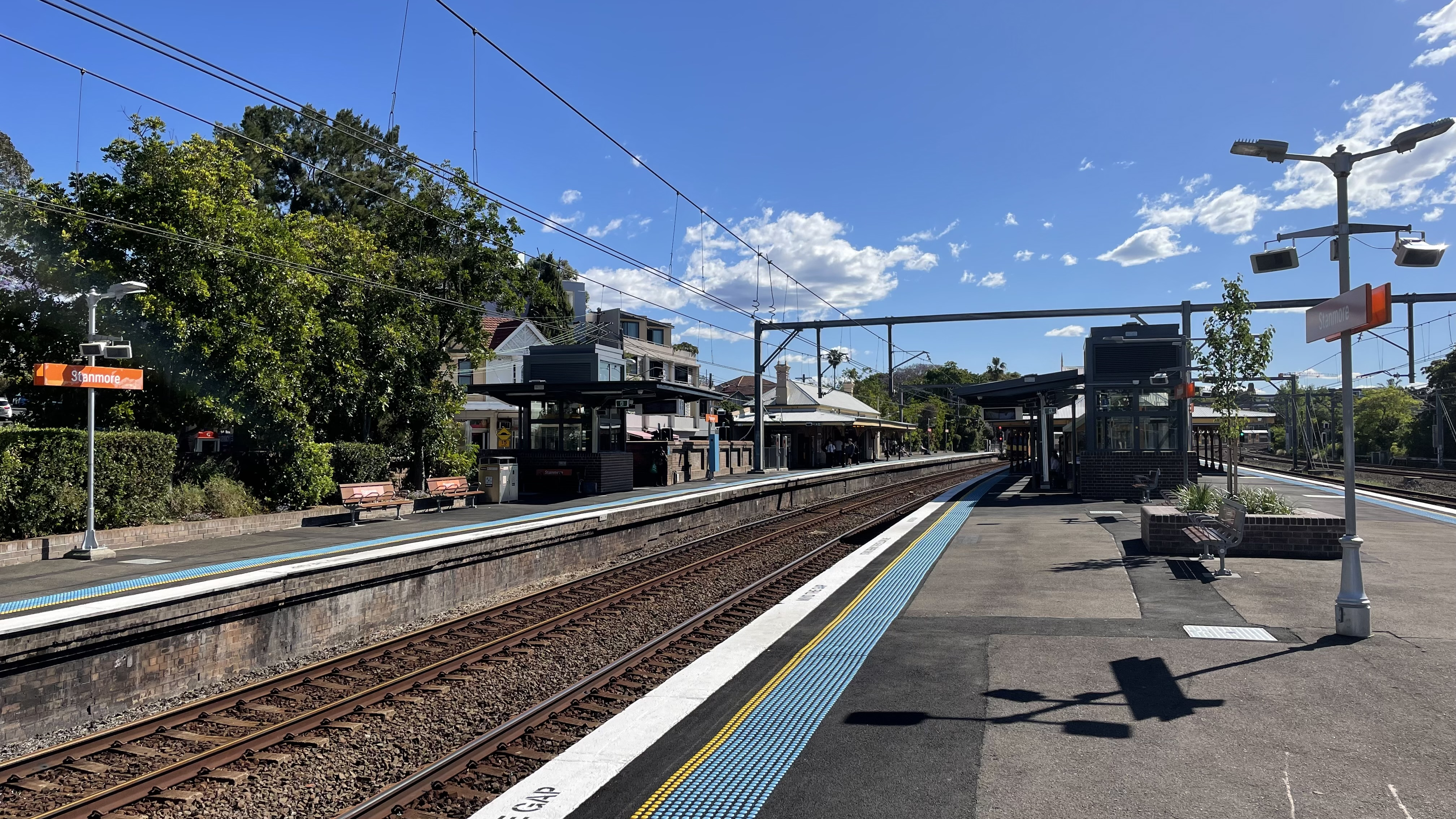
- Westbound view from Platform 2 in October 2023

General information
- Location: Trafalgar Street, Stanmore; Sydney, New South Wales; Australia
- Coordinates: 33°53′40″S 151°09′50″E
- Elevation: 39 metres (128 ft)
- Owner: Transport Asset Manager of NSW
- Operator: Sydney Trains
- Line: Main Suburban
- Distance: 4.67 km (2.90 mi) from Central
- Platforms: 3 (1 side, 1 island)
- Tracks: 6
- Connections: Bus

Construction
- Structure type: Ground
- Accessible: Yes

Other information
- Status: Weekdays: Staffed: 6am to 7pm: Weekends and public holidays: Staffed: 8am to 4pm
- Station code: SMN
- Website: Transport for NSW

History
- Opened: 7 October 1878 (148 years ago)
- Electrified: Yes (from 1928)

Passengers
- 2025: 1,516,595 (year); 4,155 (daily) (Sydney Trains)
- Rank: 92

Services
Preceding station	Sydney Trains	Following station
Petersham towards Parramatta or Leppington	Leppington & Inner West Line	Newtown towards City Circle
Petersham towards Liverpool	Liverpool & Inner West Line	Newtown towards City Circle
North Shore & Western Line does not stop here
Northern Line does not stop here

New South Wales Heritage Register
- Official name: Stanmore Railway Station Group
- Type: State heritage (built)
- Designated: 2 April 1999
- Reference no.: 1251
- Type: Railway Platform / Station
- Category: Transport – Rail
- Builders: Department of Railways
Location

Stanmore railway station is a heritage-listed suburban railway station located on the Main Suburban line, serving the Sydney suburb of Stanmore. It is served by Sydney Trains T2 Leppington & Inner West Line and T3 Liverpool & Inner West Line services. It was added to the New South Wales State Heritage Register on 2 April 1999.

== History ==
Stanmore station was opened on 7 October 1878, with a signal box erected in 1881. The present station buildings were built in 1885, and the station reopened on 17 January 1886. The existing island platform building originally fronted Douglas Street on the north side and was built to a similar design to the disused station building at Petersham. In 1885 the original pedestrian subway was built, and a new signal box (relocated from Petersham) replaced the existing signal box.

The Main Suburban line through Stanmore was quadruplicated in 1891, at which time its platform became an island platform and an awning was added to the original street facade. The platforms were also extended to 156 m and an additional platform built on the northern side of the new Up Suburban track. The station reflects the changes that came with track amplification, its original northern street frontage converted skilfully to an island by Cowdery, its relocated and extended subway and its parcels office on the new north frontage.

Further changes to the station included new barriers and a booking office in 1897; a ladies toilet on the Down Local platform in 1900; the island platforms extended in 1905; the signal box closed and Down platform extended in 1913; and stairways covered in 1923.

The main line was sextuplicated in 1927 in association with electrification works; with these changes, a new pedestrian subway was built in 1926 and the Up Suburban platform demolished.

In 1960 the Up booking office was relocated to Platforms 1 and 2 and the parcels office located in the former booking office.

Up until the 1980s, a few morning peak services from the North Shore line called at platform 1 for the benefit of Newington College students.

The station was upgraded with lifts connecting to the underpass in October 2023.

== Services ==
=== Platforms ===
Platform	Line	Stopping pattern	Notes
1		no scheduled services	
2	Leppington & Inner West Line	services to Central & the City Circle	
2	Liverpool & Inner West Line	services to Central & the City Circle (weekday early morning, late night and weekends only)	
3	Leppington & Inner West Line	services to Homebush, Leppington & Parramatta	
3	Liverpool & Inner West Line	services to Liverpool via Regents Park (weekday early morning, late night and weekends only)	

=== Transport links ===
Transit Systems operates one bus route via Stanmore station, under contract to Transport for NSW:

- 412: Martin Place to Campsie station

Stanmore station is served by one NightRide route:

- N50: Liverpool station to Town Hall station

== Trackplan ==
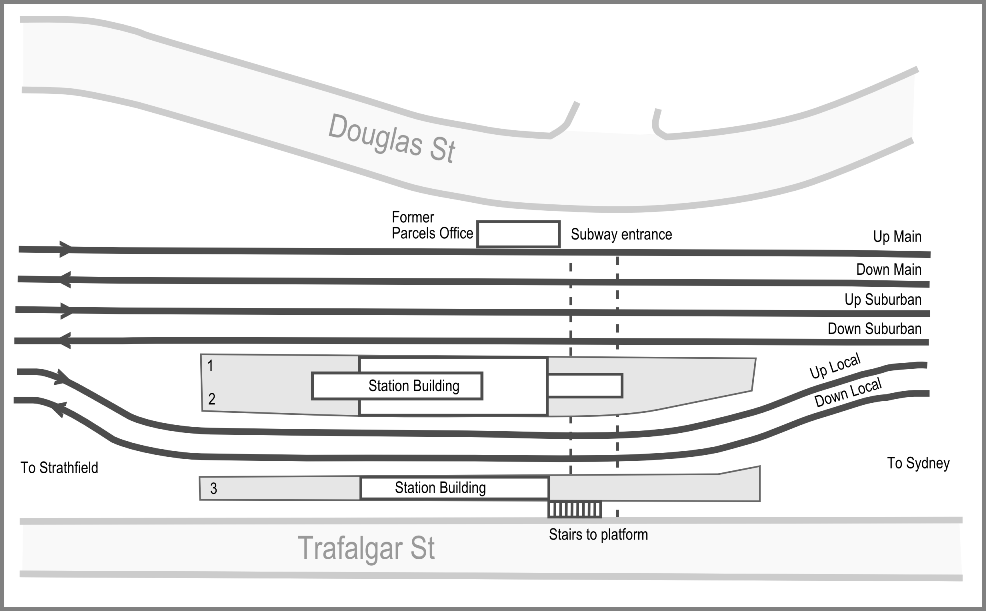
Track arrangement and station site map at Stanmore

== Description ==
Stanmore station is entered from Trafalgar Street to the south and Douglas Street to the north via the pedestrian subway. The buildings are located at an important road intersection, with shopping precincts to both the north and south. The station group comprises a wayside platform with building, island platform with building, pedestrian subway, and parcel's office to the north. The current Inner West line uses the two southernmost tracks of the six tracks passing through the station.

The station complex include the Platform 1/2 and Platform 3 station buildings (both 1886), the former parcels and booking office (1913) and the pedestrian subway (1926). Platform 1/2 dates from c. 1880s, extended in 1891, while Platform 3 dates from c. 1880s.

The integrity of Stanmore Railway Station as a whole is considered to be high based on the fact that the platform buildings, the subway, and the parcels office are rarely seen so intact on the one site.

Platform building – Platform 1/2

The "second class station" building is flanked by attached wing structures with a combination of hipped and gable roof forms. The awnings are integrated with the hipped roof to the east and west wings, and extend from below the line of the eaves to the central section of the roof. The roofing material for both the awning and the roof is corrugated steel which has replaced the original corrugated galvanised iron roofing. There are transverse gables, which face north and south, and feature decorative barge boards, finials and ridges. The hipped roofs to east and west have original chimneys and ventilated lanterns. The brickwork is painted and features a decorative dentilled course to the eastern and western ends. There are brick pilasters, with moulded rendered capitals, to the central section on the south side and in one instance the capital has been modified to accommodate a down pipe. The window openings to the western end of the building have been amended to suit the toilet facilities this section of the building now accommodates. Where this section of the building joins the waiting room there is cracking at the junction of the brickwork externally.

Air-conditioning units and modern services and conduits have been fixed to the brickwork and in front of windows on the northern elevation of this building. The awning structure consists of timber beams with stop chamfers, and purlins with beaded edge detail, supported by original cast iron columns (which have NSWGR insignia) with new corrugated metal roof sheeting.

The Station Manager's office and the booking office (at the eastern end of the building) have some original extant fabric, including pressed metal ceilings and cornices, ceiling rose, original windows and architraves (with modern security grilles). New partition walls have been constructed to create a toilet and CCTV equipment room. The store room adjacent to the Station Manager's office has (possibly original) floorboards and timber ceiling lining. The main waiting room has timber lining boards to the ceiling with a beaded profile and original mouldings. The timber floors and fixed bench seating remain and are in good condition. There is a pair of double leaf panelled doors and original windows, with timber architrave and sill boards, all in sound condition. The timber floors and fixed bench seating are also in good condition. There is a chimney breast and hearth to the western end of the room, with the opening bricked up. The waiting room, adjacent to the ladies toilet, has an original ceiling rose, door, windows and architraves and has a dado rail and skirting which is in keeping with the age of the building. There is a chimney breast and hearth to the eastern end of the room, with the opening bricked up.

The building was reported to be in good condition at the time of heritage listing, although a few surface cracks had developed in the brickwork. The building is largely intact externally although its interiors have been modified to meet ever-changing operational requirements. It retains a number of original external features namely the chimneys, ventilated lanterns, and decorative dentilled course to the brickwork and original cast iron columns with NSWGR insignia. Some of the original elements retained to the interior include pressed metal ceilings, cornices, ceiling rose, original windows, architraves, floorboards, timber ceiling lining, fixed bench seating, a pair of double leaf panelled doors and original but bricked up chimney breasts. Modern services such as air-conditioning, lighting and CCTV have been installed yet they do not detract from the integrity of the buildings overall.

Platform Building – Platform 3

The "second class station" is a brick building with a central open waiting room and enclosed rooms to either end (painted to all but Trafalgar Rd elevation). The building has a hipped roof form with original chimneys to either end. The awning extends from below the line of the eaves and the roofing material for both the awning and the roof is corrugated steel, which has replaced the original corrugated galvanised iron roofing. The awning is to the same detail as the one on Platform 1–2, supported by original cast iron columns, new corrugated metal roof sheeting, modern services and conduits are fixed to original elements. The brick wall to Trafalgar Road has been extended to both the east, to full height adjacent to the former ticket window, and to the west to provide toilet facilities. The toilet addition (c.1900) to the far west of the building is accessed through an opening in an original external wall.

The former booking office (now storage) to the eastern end of the building has some original features including ceiling rose, original windows and architraves (the ticket window has been painted out to inside). There is a chimney breast but no fireplace opening. The waiting area to the central section has timber lining boards to the ceiling, with a beaded profile and a scotia moulding. The original timber floors and fixed bench seating are in good condition. The storage to the western end has some original features including ceiling rose, original windows and mouldings including dado rail, skirtings, architraves and sill boards and chimney breast but no fireplace opening.

The building was reported to be in moderate condition at the time of heritage listing. The building is largely intact externally although its interiors have been modified to meet ever-changing operational requirements. It retains a number of original external features namely the chimneys and original cast iron columns with NSWGR insignia. Some of the original elements retained to the interior include a ceiling rose, original windows, architraves, floorboards, timber ceiling lining, fixed bench seating and an original but bricked up chimney breast. Modern services such as air-conditioning, lighting and CCTV have been installed yet they do not detract from the integrity of the buildings overall.

Former parcels and booking office

The Federation period brick building consists of two rooms which are currently used as storage. The external brickwork is in good condition, with new vents installed at low level. The original windows remain with the original coloured glazing (obscured to the exterior by security grilles). There is some damage to gutter fascia to the north-west corner. Externally, modern services and conduits have been fixed to the original fabric. There is a fibre cement slate half-gabled roof in a diamond pattern to north, east and west roof face with dormer details, with corrugated metal roofing to the south. The rainwater fixtures have been replaced.

The original door, windows and architraves remain with dado rail, skirting and wall vents which are in keeping with the age of the building. There is mini-corrugated metal sheeting to ceiling. Modern lighting, services and conduits have been face fixed to walls and ceilings. The timber glazed partition seems to be a later addition.

Generally the building is in good condition with original fabric both internally and externally. Unsympathetic repairs, to the roof in particular, graffiti and adhesive marks on the brickwork do somewhat reduce the integrity of this buildingbut can be remedied.

Platforms

Platform 1 and Platform 2 (Up) form an island platform. Platform 1 is not currently in use except by trains during track work or in emergencies. Platform 3 (Down) is a wayside platform. All the platforms have asphalt surfaces and original brick faces.

Pedestrian Subway

The subway is face brick, with recessed detail to stairs, and a painted render finish to subway. There are areas of replacement brickwork and repairs to pointing are visible. The covered stair to Platform 1-2 is a painted timber-framed structure with lining boards over rafters, which is in good condition. There are security grilles covering the openings to the outside. The timber elements are all fairly plain except at the entrance to the platform where there are stop chamfered posts and mouldings to rafters. There is modern lighting and service conduits and pipes face fixed to the walls. The concrete stairs are relatively new.

The subway has been changed but it also retains original fabric namely the brick walls, the steel girder and concrete ceiling.

Historically significant moveable items

- Safe in Station Manager's Office
- Desk/Shelving Unit in Station Manager's Office
- Bench seating to waiting Rooms

=== Modifications and dates ===
- 1881: Block signal box erected.
- 1885: New signal box from Petersham re-erected; original pedestrian subway built.
- 1891: Platforms extended to 156 m and an additional platform built on the northern side of the new Up Suburban track.
- 1897: Barriers and booking office provided.
- 1900: Ladies toilet on Down Local platform.
- 1905: Island platforms extended.
- 1913: Signal box closed; Down platform extended.
- 1923: Stairways covered.
- 1926: New pedestrian subway built in association with widening to six tracks; Up Suburban platform demolished due to track amplification.
- 1928: Local and Suburban lines electrified to Homebush.
- c. 1944-46 Modifications to former booking/parcel office (subject to confirmation)
- 1955: Main lines electrified to Homebush.
- 1960: Up booking office relocated to Platforms 1 and 2; parcels office located in former booking office.

== Heritage listing ==
Stanmore Railway Station has State significance for its group of largely intact, original structures dating from the 1880s establishment of the station through to the 1891 quadruplication and the 1927 sextuplication of the line, which are able to demonstrate the growth and expansion of the railways in the late 19th and early 20th century. It is significant for its collection of railway structures namely the 1880s platform buildings, the 1910s former parcels and booking office and the 1920s subway which have remained largely intact and form a cohesive group which is able to effectively represent suburban railway stations of the late 19th century. The extant 1880s platform buildings are excellent examples of "second class station" buildings which have a high level of integrity. The group remains relatively intact and is a significant landmark in the local area.

Stanmore railway station was listed on the New South Wales State Heritage Register on 2 April 1999 having satisfied the following criteria.

The place is important in demonstrating the course, or pattern, of cultural or natural history in New South Wales.

Stanmore Railway Station has State significance as the station with its group of largely intact, original structures dating from the 1880s establishment of the station through to the 1891 quadruplication and the 1927 sextuplication of the line, is able to demonstrate the growth and expansion of the railways in the late 19th and early 20th century. The 1880s platform buildings, the 1910s former parcels and booking office and the 1920s subway collectively represent key historic phases of suburban railway development.

The place has a strong or special association with a person, or group of persons, of importance of cultural or natural history of New South Wales's history.

Stanmore Railway Station is significant for its association with Engineer-in-Chief George Cowdery who was influential in guiding the changes made to the station as part of the 1891 quadruplication of the line namely the conversion of the existing island Platform 1-2 and the construction of the former parcels and booking office along Douglas Street.

The place is important in demonstrating aesthetic characteristics and/or a high degree of creative or technical achievement in New South Wales.

Collectively the complex of station structures at Stanmore Railway Station have local aesthetic significance. The 1880s "second class station buildings" displays large central brick buildings flanked by attached wing structures, hipped roofs with a transverse gable and awnings supported by original cast iron columns with decorative brackets. The former parcels and booking office is an example of the Federation style architecture prevalent in late 19th and early 20th century suburban railway stations. Together the platform buildings along Trafalgar Street and the subway and former parcels and booking office along Douglas Street form significant landmarks in the local area.

The place has strong or special association with a particular community or cultural group in New South Wales for social, cultural or spiritual reasons.

The place has the potential to contribute to the local community's sense of place and can provide a connection to the local community's history.

The place is important in demonstrating the principal characteristics of a class of cultural or natural places/environments in New South Wales.

The platform buildings at Stanmore Railway Station are largely intact externally and retain a large amount of original fabric externally and internally and are therefore amongst the best examples of this type of platform building. The subway has been changed but it retains characteristic features of a subway namely connecting the street to the platforms and has some original fabric and is therefore a good representation.

== Gallery ==
After station upgrade
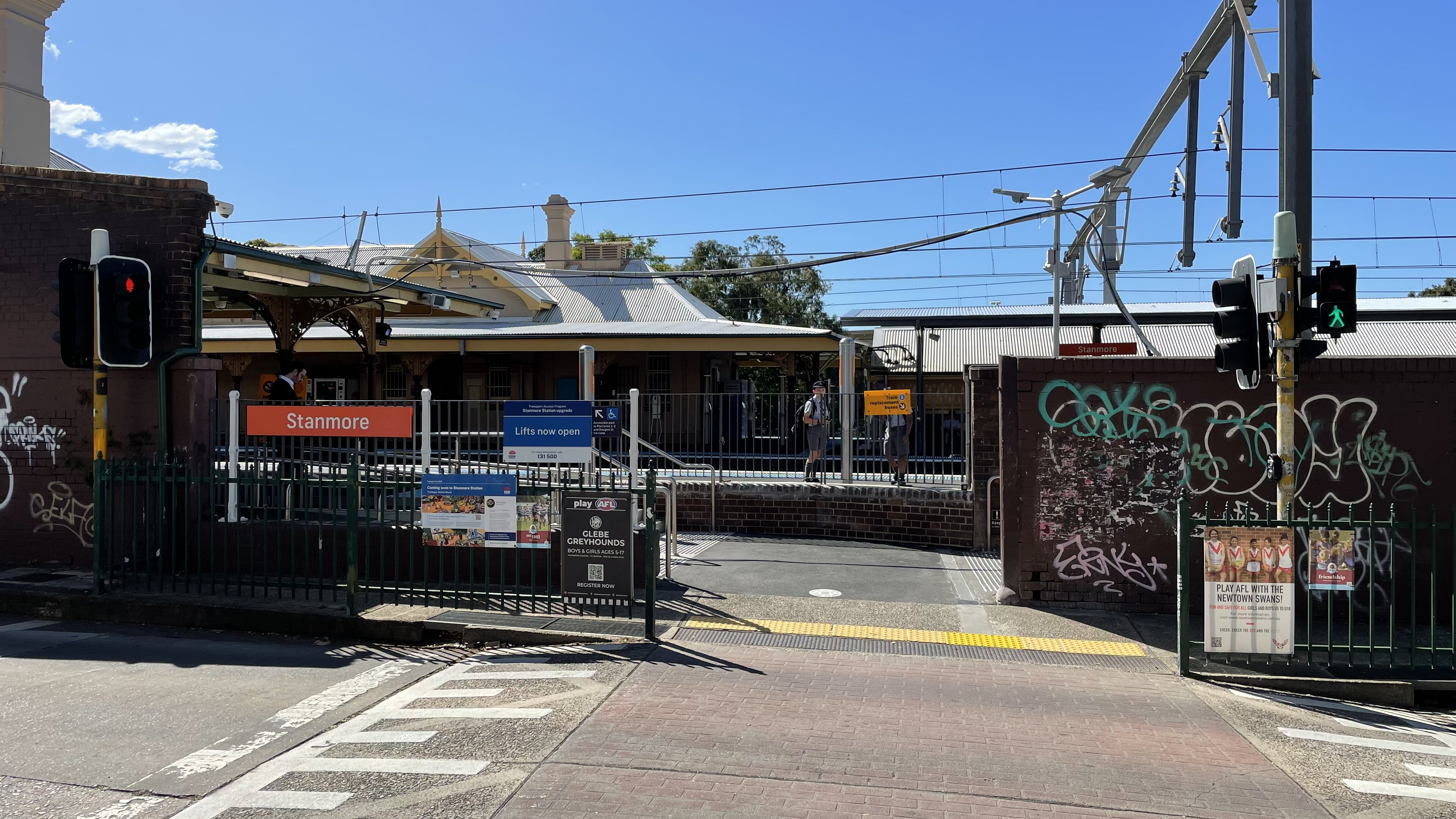
Entrance from Trafalgar Street

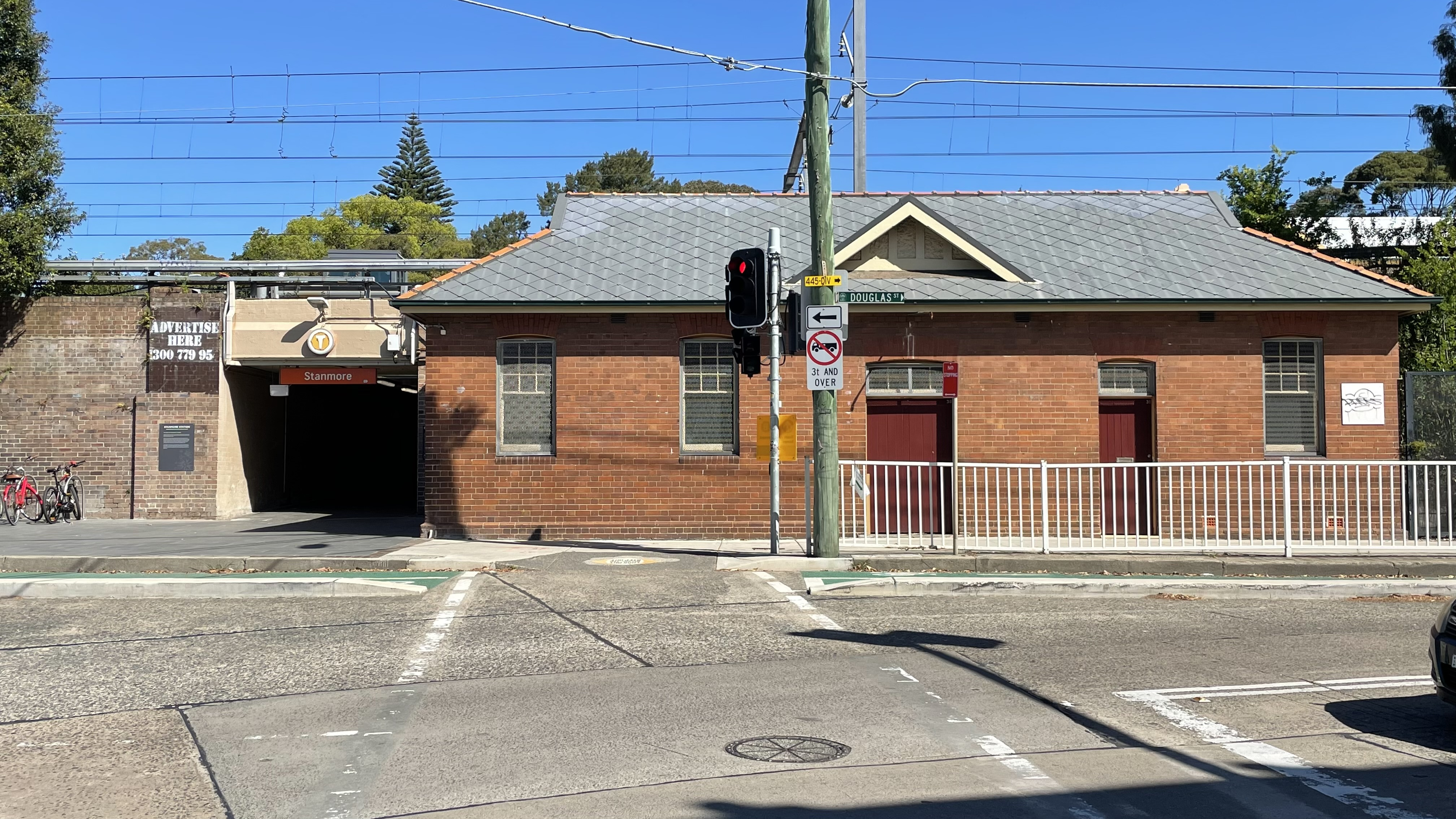
Entrance from Douglas Street

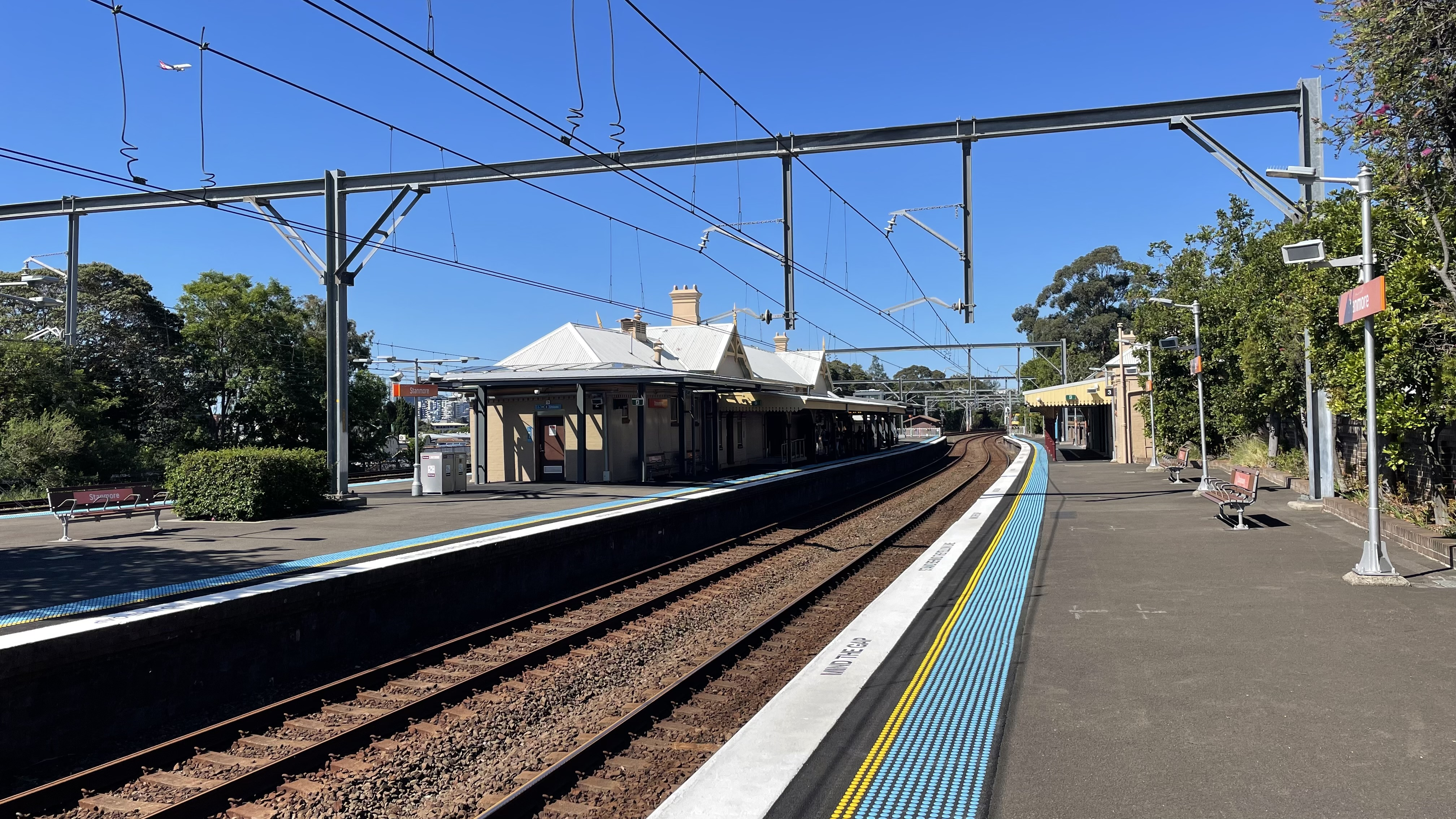
Eastbound view from Platform 3

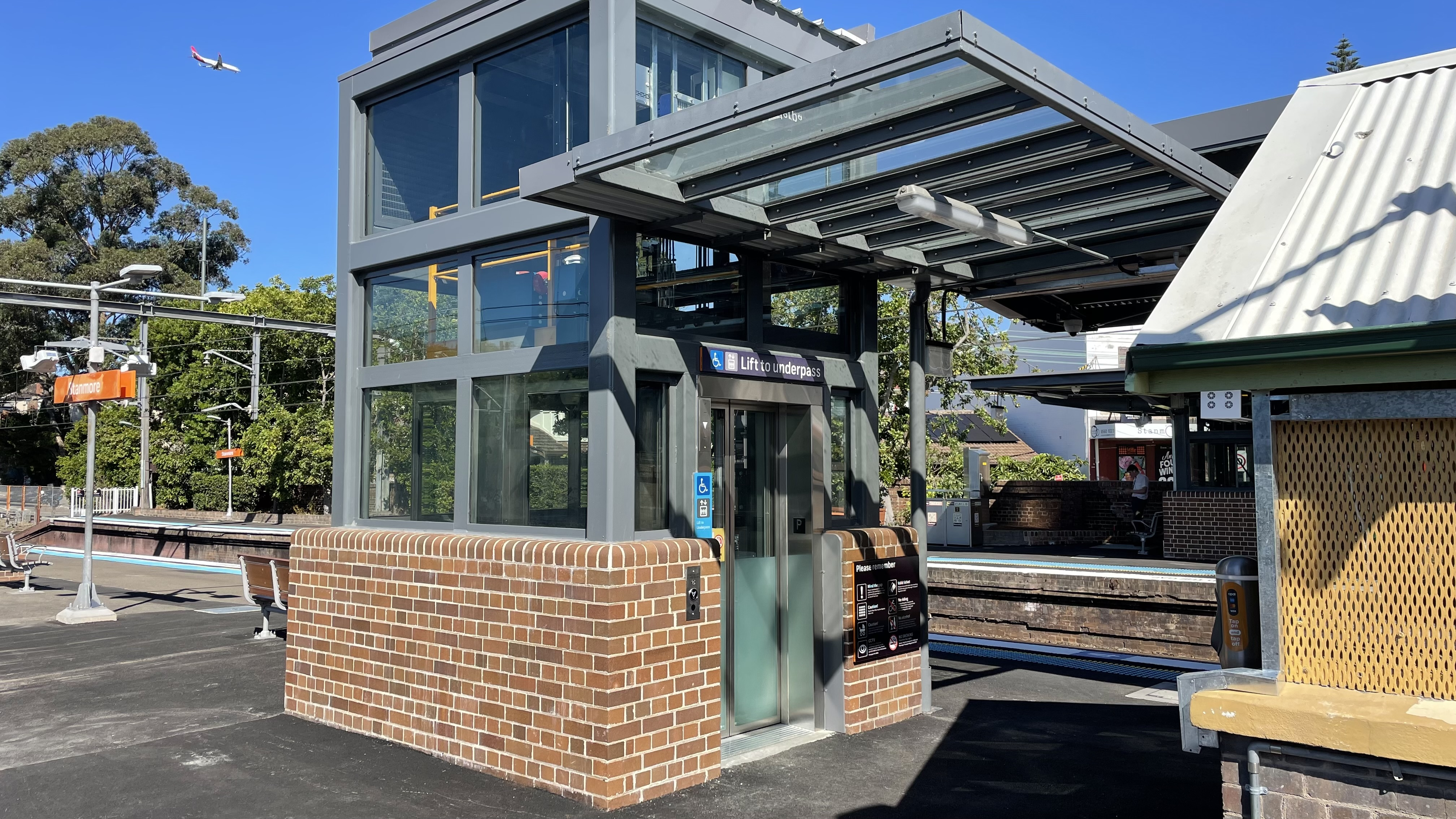
Lift on Platform 1/2
Before station upgrade
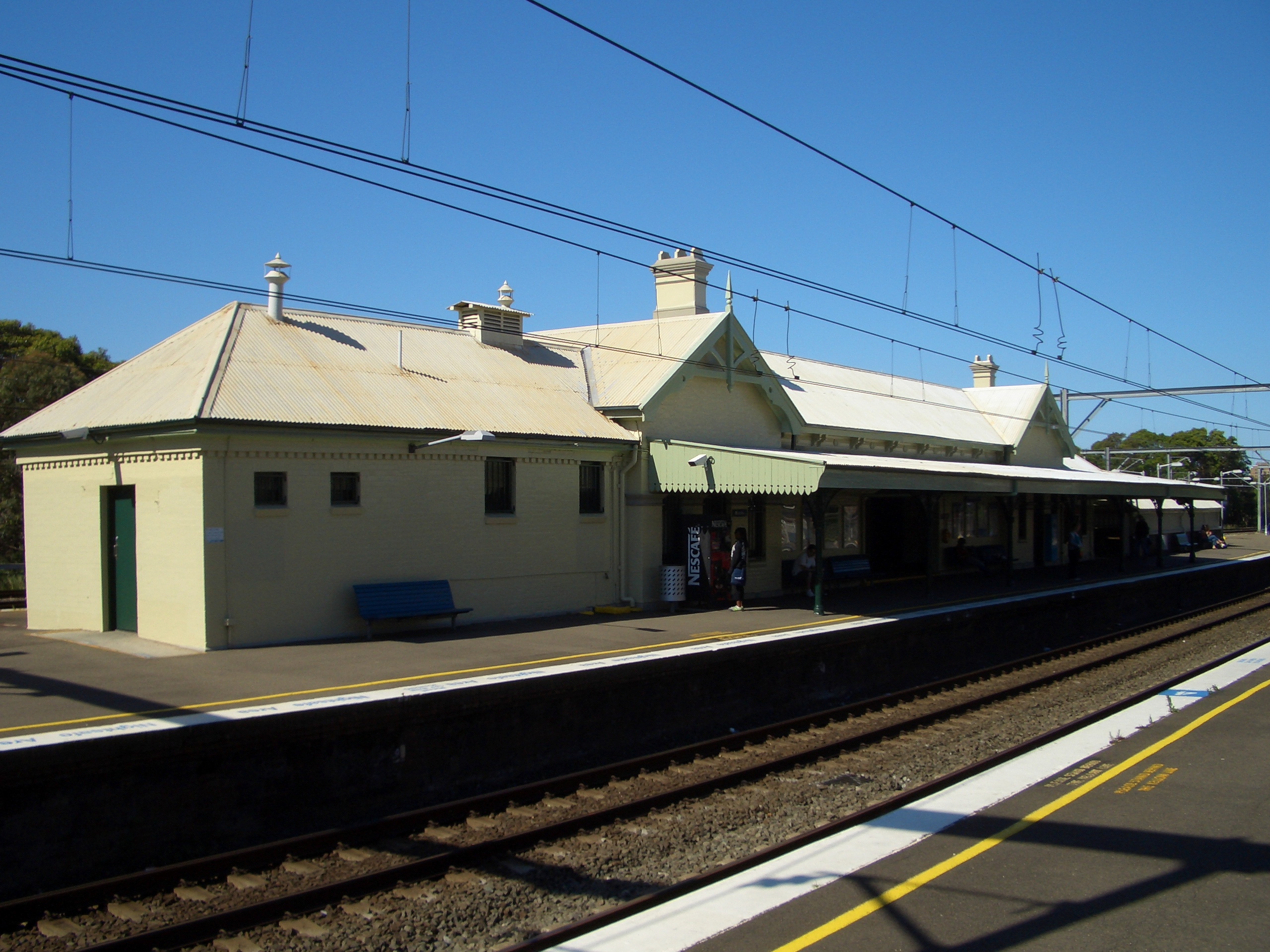
Station building on platform 2

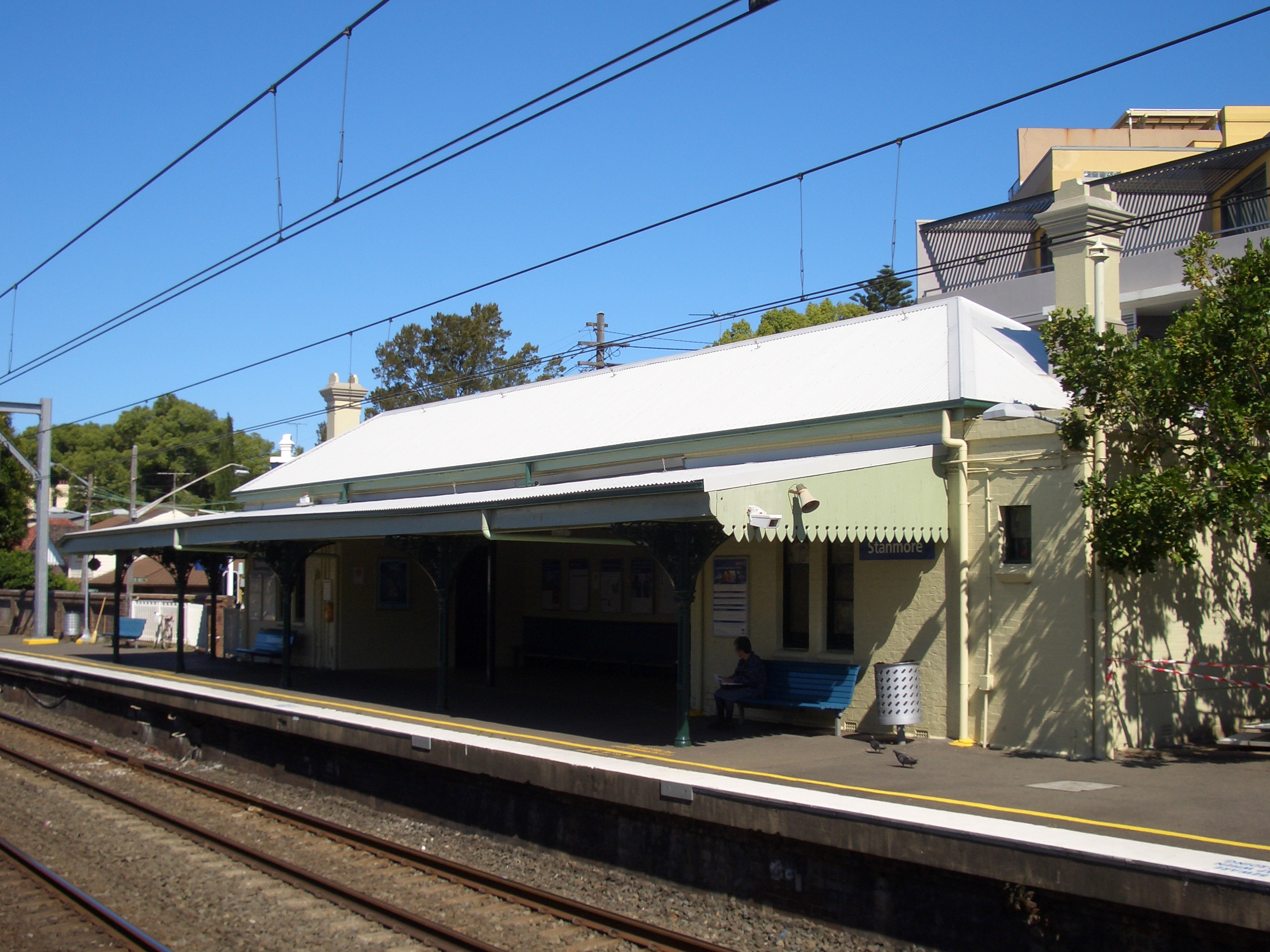
Station building on platform 3

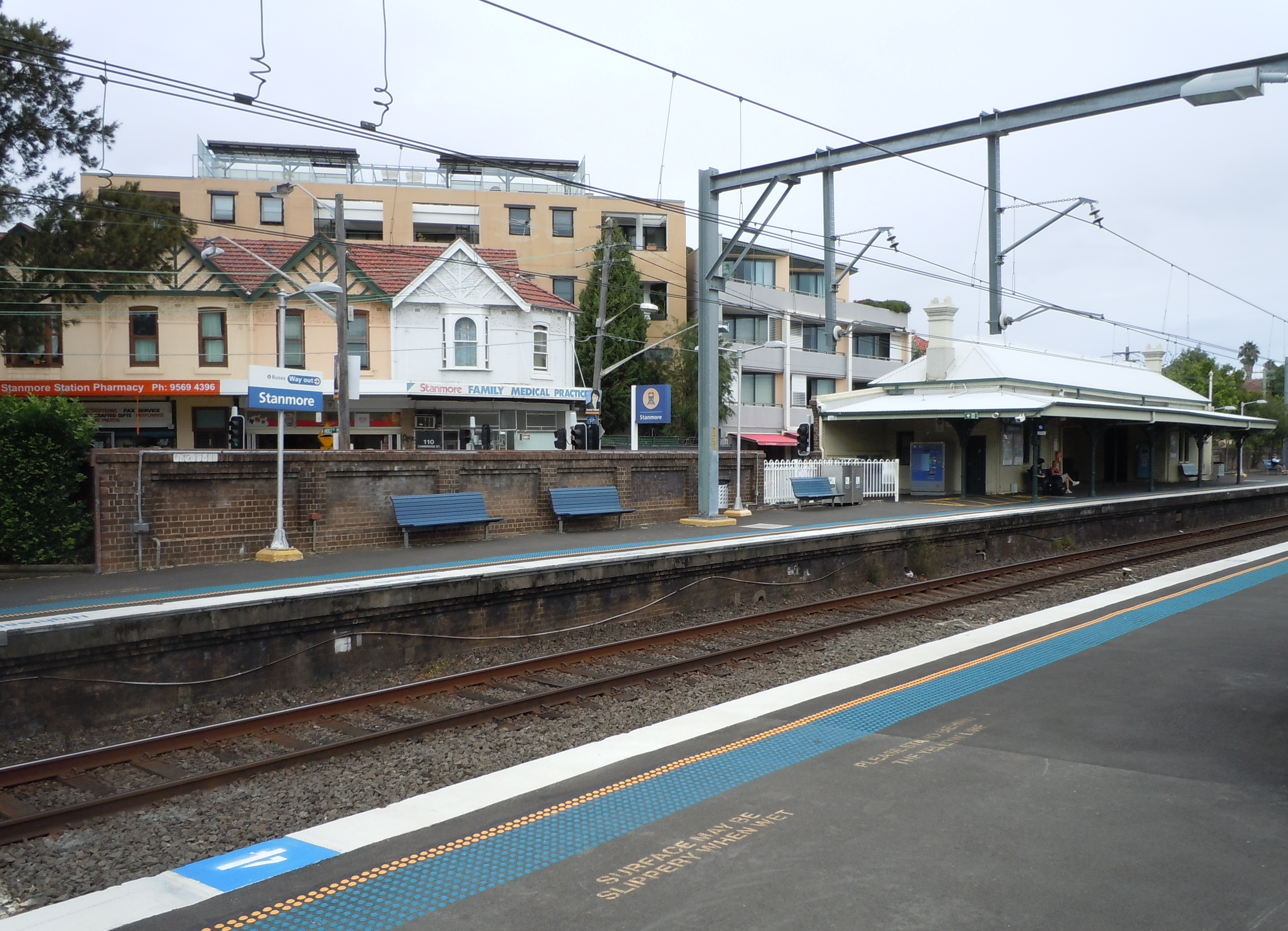
Platform 3

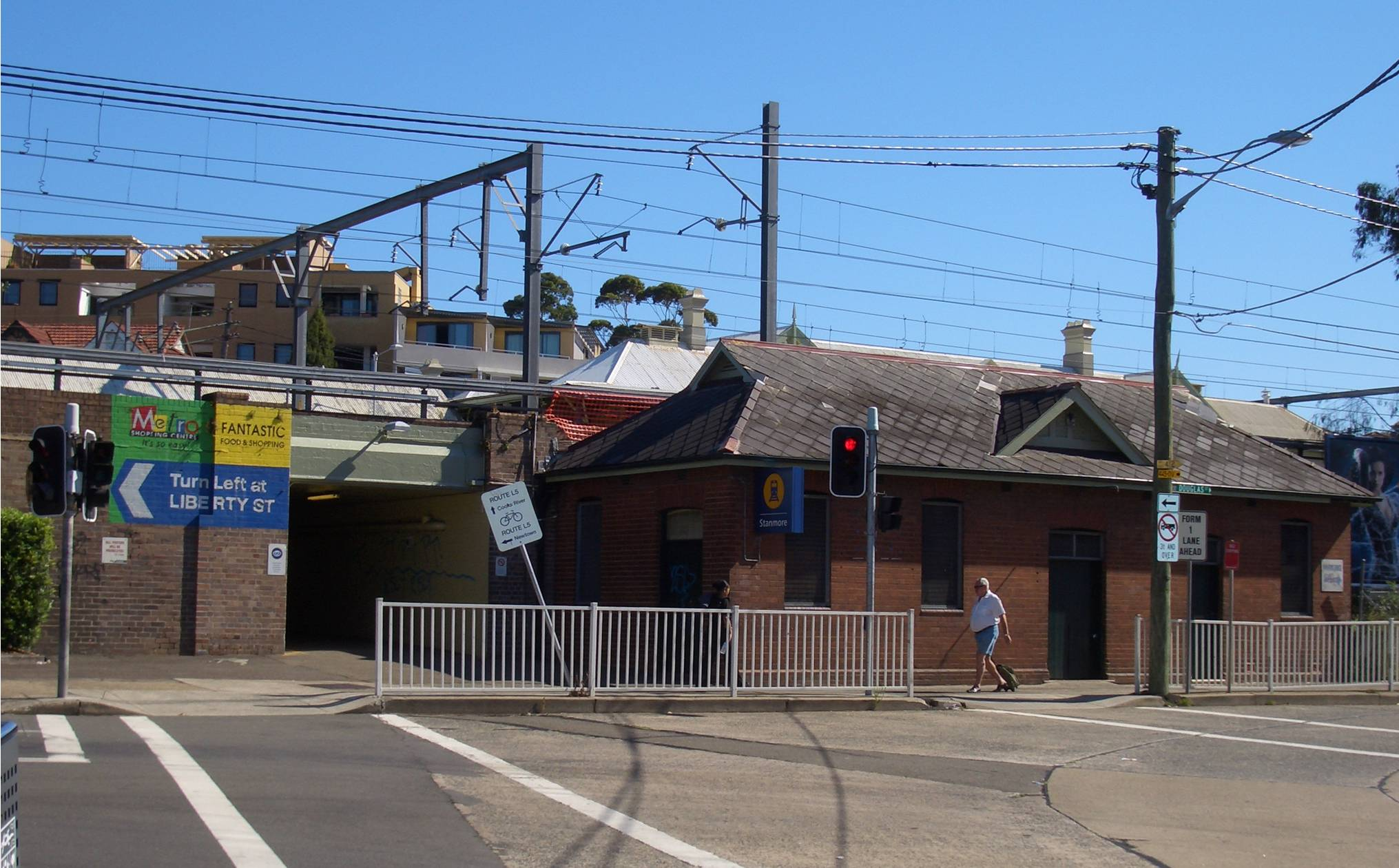
Northern entrance showing the closed parcels office

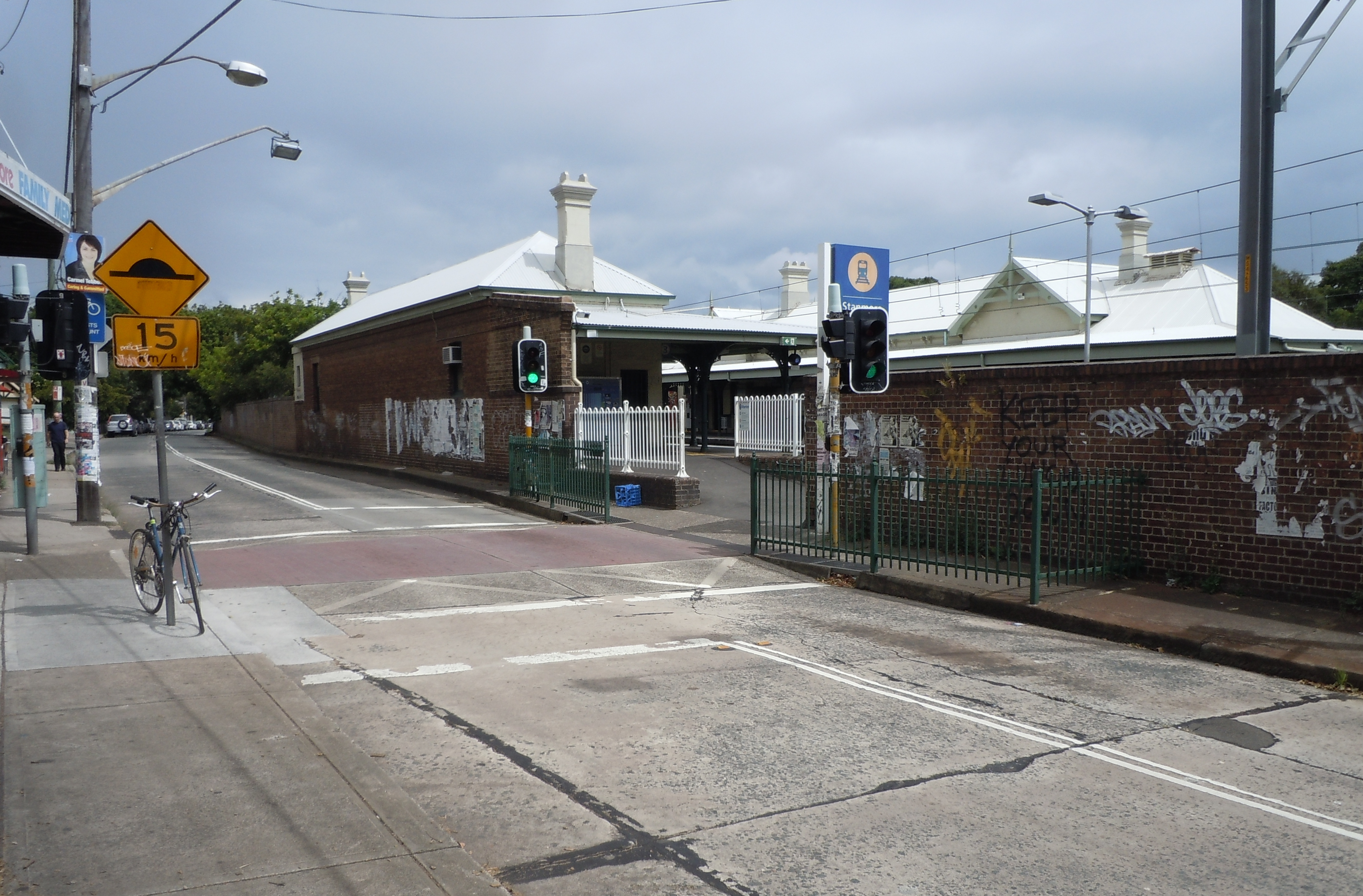
Southern entrance
