= C. James Tinsley =

Australian Baptist minister

Charles James Tinsley (died 18 March 1960), commonly referred to as C. J. Tinsley, was a Baptist preacher in Sydney, Australia. For 44 years he had charge of the Baptist Church at Stanmore, New South Wales, a highly successful ministry.

== History ==
Tinsley was born sometime around 1875 in Melbourne, the youngest son of James Tinsley (c. 1841 – c. 15 September 1918), a London engineer who emigrated to Australia in 1871 to take a position as foreman engineer of the Melbourne Mint.

Around 1876 he left for Sydney, where he worked as a shopkeeper, then in 1884 he left for Bathurst, where he worked as engine driver at various flour mills, also at Wark's gasworks. It was during this period that he became involved with the Baptist church, serving as superintendent of the Sunday-school. Often referred to as James Tinsley Sen., to distinguish him from his youngest son, he moved to Young, then in 1917 to Waitara (near Hornsby) to live with his daughter, Mrs Dark (often written Darke), and where he died.

Tinsley, who when young was also known as James, spent his boyhood at Bathurst, educated at Bathurst Public School when Major Dettman was headmaster. He excelled at mathematics and science subjects and went on to Bathurst Technical College. He emulated his father's attachment to the Bathurst Baptist church and, following Pastor James Worboys, became a convinced teetotaler: a member of the Band of Hope and W.C.T.U., outdoing the women in his abhorrence of alcohol.

He qualified as a school teacher, and briefly taught at Blackfriars School, Chippendale, but soon left the Education Department for the Baptist church at Bodangora, near Wellington. 18 months later he left for London, where he attended Spurgeon's College, graduating three years later. He then accepted a call to the newly established Baptist church at Stanmore, baptising some 900 and attracting over 1300 church members, a State record. He was elected president of the N.S.W. Christian Endeavour Union in 1905, and in the same year was elected president of the first instance of the Council of Churches in New South Wales. In 1912 he was elected president of the Baptist Union.

Despite a radical change in the town's demography, the Stanmore Baptist church remained enthusiastic missionaries, attributable to Tinsley's leadership and evangelistic ability. In 1954, aged 78, Tinsley was still preaching, twice every Sunday at the City Tabernacle, Brisbane.

He was still registered in 1960 at 43 Abbotsford Road, Homebush, but died at the Masonic Hospital, Ashfield, on 18 March 1960.

== Family ==
James Tinsley Sen. (died September 1918) married a Miss Wright, who died in September 1902; their children included:

- Walter J. Tinsley (c. 1871 – 6 October 1948) was a plumber and gasfitter in Bathurst married to Margaret. Their son Roy Tinsley married a Miss Thompson; their son Bobby died in January 1935 after suffering whooping cough.
- Charles James Tinsley ( – 18 March 1960), Baptist minister, Stanmore, married Mildred Rosetta White on 17 May 1905.
- Elizabeth Frances Tinsley (c. 1877 – c. 25 September 1912) married Ernest H. Potter on 21 July 1902.
- daughter married George Dark of Raglan, later Waitara.
- daughter married E. A. Wright
- Bertha Tinsley of Chatswood

== Other Tinsley Baptist ministers ==
Rev. Allan S. Tinsley, the younger son of C. J. Tinsley, was a Baptist minister in South Australia, at Unley Park Baptist Church in 1962, later of Victor Harbor. He was President S.A. Baptist Union in 1962, also Moderator and Director of Church Extension for the S.A. Baptist Union.

Rev. David Alfred Tinsley was born at Blackheath in 1934, studied chemical engineering at the University of New South Wales, then in 1966 entered NSW Baptist Theological College, and served at Narrabeen church. He was ordained in 1970, served three years at Hornsby Heights, then moved to North Canberra Baptist church in 1971. He died in 2010, and was recognised by a memorial service at the Mitcham Baptist Church on 11 October 2010. Relationship to C. J. Tinsley, if any, has not been found.
