= Peter A .Tinsley =

American Economist (born c. 1939)

Peter A. Tinsley
- Born: January 21, 1939; Pikeville, Kentucky
- Died: March 19, 2018 (aged 79); Washington, DC
- Education: Hobart and William Smith, Geneva, New York–BA; Princeton University, Ph.D
- Scientific career
- Fields: Economics; Econometrics
- Workplaces: Federal Reserve System; Cambridge University, Cambridge, UK; Birkbeck College, London

Peter A. Tinsley (January 21, 1939 – March 19, 2018) was an American economist. His research focused on economic dynamics, dynamic optimization, monetary economics, and monetary policy, and econometrics issues.

== Career ==
In 1965, after receiving his Ph.D. from Princeton University, Tinsley joined the staff of the Board of Governors of the Federal Reserve System as an Economist in the Division of Research and Statistics. In 1998 he retired as a Deputy Associate Director to join the Faculty of Economics and Politics at the University of Cambridge, where he taught from 1998 to 2003, first as a visitor and then as a permanent member. In 2006, he joined the Department of Economics, Mathematics and Statistics at Birkbeck College University of London, where he taught as full-Professor until 2014.

Soon after joining the Federal Reserve, Tinsley published a ground-breaking paper on variable-weight distributed lags which posited that contrary to extant modeling, delayed adjustments of capital and inventories where influenced by outside factors that varied over time in potentially cyclical ways. In design and concept, including the introduction of empirical measures of forward expectations, Tinsley was instrumental in the design of the Federal Reserve's FRBUS forward-looking macro-economic policy model designed to meet the Lucas Critique head-on, so that most behavioral equations are based on specifications of optimizing behavior containing explicit expectations of firms, households, and financial markets. This model is now used for FOMC monetary policy decision making.

== Selected publications ==
- Tinsley, P. A. (December 1970). "On Ramps, Turnpikes, and Distributed Lag Approximations of Intertemporal Adjustment". Economic Inquiry. 8 (4): 397–411. doi:10.1111/j.1465-7295.1970.tb01096.x. ProQuest 1297269034.
- Tinsley, P. A. (1971). "A Variable Adjustment Model of Labor Demand". International Economic Review. 12 (3): 482–510. doi:10.2307/2525359. JSTOR 2525359.
- Swamy, P.A.V.B.; Tinsley, P.A. (February 1980). "Linear prediction and estimation methods for regression models with stationary stochastic coefficients". Journal of Econometrics. 12 (2): 103–142. doi:10.1016/0304-4076(80)90001-9.
- Tinsley, P.; Von Zur Muehlen, P. (January 1981). "A maximum probability approach to short-run policy". Journal of Econometrics. 15 (1): 31–48. doi:10.1016/0304-4076(81)90128-7.
- Tinsley, P. A. (March 1970). "Capital Structure, Precautionary Balances, and Valuation of the Firm: The Problem of Financial Risk". The Journal of Financial and Quantitative Analysis. 5 (1): 33–62. doi:10.2307/2979006. JSTOR 2979006.
- Swamy, P.A.V.B.; Barth, J.R.; Tinsley, P.A. (November 1982). "The rational expectations approach to economic modelling". Journal of Economic Dynamics and Control. 4: 125–147. doi:10.1016/0165-1889(82)90009-4.
- Kozicki, Sharon; Tinsley, P.A. (1997). "Moving Endpoints and the Internal Consistency of Agents' Ex Ante Forecasts". Computational Economics. 11 (1/2): 21–40. doi:10.1023/A:1008618512649.
- Kalchbrenner, J. H.; Tinsley, P. A. (1976). "On the Use of Feedback Control in the Design of Aggregate Monetary Policy". The American Economic Review. 66 (2): 349–355. JSTOR 1817246.
- Neumark, David; Tinsley, P. A.; Tosini, Suzanne (March 1991). "After-Hours Stock Prices and Post-Crash Hangovers". The Journal of Finance. 46 (1): 159–178. doi:10.1111/j.1540-6261.1991.tb03748.x.
- Kozicki, Sharon; Tinsley, P.A (January 2001). "Term structure views of monetary policy under alternative models of agent expectations". Journal of Economic Dynamics and Control. 25 (1–2): 149–184. doi:10.1016/S0165-1889(99)00072-X.
- Kozicki, Sharon; Tinsley, P.A. (June 2001). "Shifting endpoints in the term structure of interest rates". Journal of Monetary Economics. 47 (3): 613–652. doi:10.1016/S0304-3932(01)00054-X.
- Tinsley, P.A. (April 2002). "Rational Error Correction". Computational Economics. 19 (2): 197–225. doi:10.1023/A:1015056028963.
- Kozicki, Sharon; Tinsley, P.A. (August 2002). "Dynamic specifications in optimizing trend-deviation macro models". Journal of Economic Dynamics and Control. 26 (9–10): 1585–1611. doi:10.1016/S0165-1889(01)00086-0.
- Clouse, James; Henderson, Dale; Orphanides, Athanasios; Small, David H.; Tinsley, P.A. (24 January 2003). "Monetary Policy When the Nominal Short-Term Interest Rate is Zero". Topics in Macroeconomics. 3 (1). doi:10.2202/1534-5998.1088.
- Kozicki, Sharon; Tinsley, P.A. (March 2005). "What do you expect? Imperfect policy credibility and tests of the expectations hypothesis". Journal of Monetary Economics. 52 (2): 421–447. doi:10.1016/j.jmoneco.2004.05.004.
- Kozicki, Sharon; Tinsley, P.A. (November 2005). "Permanent and transitory policy shocks in an empirical macro model with asymmetric information". Journal of Economic Dynamics and Control. 29 (11): 1985–2015. doi:10.1016/j.jedc.2005.06.003.
- Kozicki, Sharon; Tinsley, P.A. (September 2009). "Perhaps the 1970s FOMC did what it said it did" (PDF). Journal of Monetary Economics. 56 (6): 842–855. doi:10.1016/j.jmoneco.2009.06.009.
- Kozicki, Sharon; Tinsley, P. A. (February 2012). "Effective Use of Survey Information in Estimating the Evolution of Expected Inflation". Journal of Money, Credit and Banking. 44 (1): 145–169. doi:10.1111/j.1538-4616.2011.00471.x.
