= List of former tramway junctions in Sydney =

This is a list of former tramway junctions in Sydney, Australia, which were part of the network of trams in Sydney that existed up to 1961. It includes only junctions of tram lines that were designated with a name that included the word "Junction". Some junctions were also terminating locations or section points for fares and had greater public significance as a result. Some of the names of former tramway junctions remain in use, as the name of a suburb or locality, even though the tram lines no longer exist. In other cases, the names are no longer used, and their inclusion in this list is of historical relevance only. The list is in alphabetic order. Unofficial names are shown in single inverted commas.

Junction name	Other / Older name	Location and Coordinates	Destination sign (terminating at junction)	Original significance	Later significance (before 1961)	Current significance
Anzac Parade Junction	Randwick Road Junction (mainly before 1917) 'Cleveland Street Junction'	Cleveland Street either to reserved track on east side (permanent tram routes) or reserved track on west side of Anzac Parade (formerly Randwick Road), Moore Park 33°53′42.3″S 151°13′16.5″E	Cleveland St	Railway Square trams branched from trams to Circular Quay (inbound) Also gave access to loop lines for special trams for Sydney Showground, Sydney Sports Ground, and Sydney Cricket Ground	Continued in use until last trams in 1961.	(Name is no longer used)
Belgrave Street Junction		Belgrave Street into Raglan Street, Manly 33°47′44.1″S 151°17′06.6″E	(None)	Trams to The Spit branched from trams to Narabeen	Tram service ceased in 1939.	(Name is no longer used)
Bondi Junction		Oxford Street to Grosvenor Street (becomes Bronte Road), Bondi Junction 33°53′31.6″S 151°14′59.3″E	Bondi Junction	Bronte trams branched from Bondi trams (outbound)	Tram service ceased in 1960	Suburb of Bondi Junction
Cabarita Junction	Cabarita Road Junction	Frederick Street to Cabarita Road, Concord 33°51′06.8″S 151°06′27.4″E	(None)	Cabarita trams branched from Mortlake trams (outbound)	Tram service ceased in 1948. Cabarita Junction was the official name used for the local post office from 1953 to 1971, when it closed.	Cabarita Junction is occasionally used locally, and is also the name of two bus stops, one in Frederick St and one in Cabarita Rd.
Church Street Junction		Blaxland Road to Church Street Ryde 33°48′49.2″S 151°06′21.3″E (Not to be confused with Church Street Junction in Maitland.)	(None)	Trams to West Ryde railway station branched off before Ryde terminus.	Church Street Junction was sometimes used to describe the locality later unofficially called Top Ryde. Tramway junction not used after 1934 closure of branch.	(Name is no longer used)
City Road Junction	Newtown Road Junction	Broadway / Parramatta Road and City Road (formerly Newtown Road), Chippendale 33°53′04.1″S 151°11′41.4″E	City Road Jun.	Trams via Newtown branched from Parramatta Road lines. Also connection between trams from Eastern ('Red') lines (via Regent Street) and Western ('Green') lines	In 1893, the first tramway signal box was installed near here. As well as City Road / Newtown Junction, it controlled the points at two nearby junctions for Glebe and Forest Lodge directions. Later City Road Junction had its own separate signal box.	City Road Junction is occasionally used to describe the intersection
'Clovelly Junction'		Intersection of Clovelly Road and Frenchman's Road, Randwick 33°54′30.0″S 151°14′51.5″E	(None)	Cross country tram route from Coogee to Bondi Junction connected with tram route to Clovelly.	Name seems to have been used unofficially for the locality.	(Name is no longer used)
Cremorne Junction	Military Road Junction	Military Road to Spofforth Street, Cremorne 33°49′41.2″S 151°13′49.0″E	Cremorne Junction	Trams to Cremorne Wharf branched from trams to Wynyard and Chatswood (inbound). Trams from Mosman Wharf terminated here.	Spofforth St side not used after 1956. Tram service ceased in 1958.	Locality of Cremorne Junction
Crown Street Junction		Oxford Street to Crown Street, Darlinghurst 33°52′45.1″S 151°12′54.8″E	(None)	Trams to West Kensington via Surry Hills branched from Bondi, Bronte, Coogee, Clovelly, Maroubra and La Perouse trams.	Tram service ceased in Crown Street in 1957.	(Name is no longer used)
Crows Nest Junction		Pacific Highway, Willoughby Road and Falcon Street, Crows Nest (a three way junction) 33°49′39.6″S 151°12′02.6″E	Crows Nest Junction	Trams to Chatswood branched from trams to Lane Cove (outbound) Trams to Taronga Zoo and Balmoral branched from trams to Wynyard (inbound).	Tram service ceased in 1958.	Crows Nest Junction is sometimes used to describe the intersection and its immediate surrounding locality
Daceyville Junction	Kingsford Junction 'Nine Ways'	Anzac Parade and Gardeners Road (and other streets without trams, known as 'Nine Ways'), Kingsford 33°55′28.7″S 151°13′42″E	Daceyville Jun. (on Anzac Pde trams only)	Change to / from trams on Gardners Road that used the destination 'Daceyville'	The intersection was known as 'Nine Ways' from 1932. Nine Ways was the originally proposed name for the light rail stop, in line with Geographical Names Board guidelines that names of commercial businesses are not used.	(Name is no longer used) Now near the terminus of the L2 Light rail line and the Juniors Kingsford light rail station (so named after public pressure from shock-jock Ray Hadley)
Darley Road Junction		Alison Road (reserved track) to Darley Road 33°54′22.3″S 151°13′52.2″E	(None)	Clovelly trams branched from Coogee trams (outbound), and also used for entry to Randwick Tramway Workshops	Darley Street line not used after 1957, when Clovelly tram service ceased	(Name is no longer used)
Darling Street Junction		Victoria Road to Darling Street, Balmain 33°51′49.9″S 151°10′12.4″E	(None)	Connection between Ryde trams and Balmain and Birchgrove trams.		(Name is no longer used)
Darlinghurst Junction	Taylor Square	Oxford Street or Campbell Street to Flinders Street, Darlinghurst 33°52′50.1″S 151°13′00.9″E	(None)	Trams to Coogee, Clovelly, Maroubra and La Perouse branched from trams to Bondi and Bronte (outbound)	Bondi and Bronte tram service ceased in 1960.	(Name is no longer used) Area around the intersection is well known as Taylor Square
Epping Junction		Crescent Street (now Minogue Crescent), Glebe to reserved track toward Lilyfield and reserved track toward Taylor Street, Annandale 33°52′46.8″S 151°10′38.8″E	(None)	Trams to Lilyfield branched from trams to Balmain (outbound). Named after nearby Epping Raceway (later Harold Park)		(Name is no longer used)
Falcon Street Junction	Falcon and Miller Street Junction	Miller Street crossing Falcon Street, North Sydney 33°49′44.3″S 151°12′32.3″E	(None)	Trams to Northbridge connect with trams branching to Spit, Taronga Zoo and Balmoral (outbound)		(Name is no longer used)
Gardeners Road and Botany Road Junction		Botany Road to Gardeners Road, Rosebery / Alexandria 33°55′16.8″S 151°11′47.7″E	Gard'ners and Botany Rds. Jun.	Daceyville trams branched from Botany trams		(Name is no longer used)
Glebe Junction		Parramatta Road to Glebe Point Road, Glebe 33°53′04.2″S 151°11′35.2″E	(None)	Glebe trams branched from Parramatta Rd trams (outbound)		(name no longer in use)
Greens Road Junction		Oxford Street to Greens Road, Paddington 33°52′59.9″S 151°13′15.3″E	(None)	Special trams for Sydney Showground, Sydney Sports Ground, and Sydney Cricket Ground branched from Bondi and Bronte trams		(Name is no longer used)
Harbord Junction		Pittwater Road to reserved track (now Oliver Street), Queenscliff 33°46′53.9″S 151°16′42.5″E	(None)	Trams to Harbord branch from trams to Narrabeen	Manly tram services ceased in 1939.	(Name is no longer used. The suburb, Harbord, was renamed Freshwater in 2008.)
Henderson Road Junction	Raglan Street Junction	Botany Road to Henderson Road, Alexandria 33°53′48.0″S 151°11′57.5″E	(None)	Alexandria and Erskineville trams branched from Botany and Daceyville trams (outbound)	Junction not used after 1959	(Name is no longer used)
Illawarra Road Junction		Marrickville Road to Illawarra Road, Marrickville 33°54′37.9″S 151°09′23.0″E	(None)	Earlwood trams branched from Dulwich Hill trams (outbound)	Tram service ceased in 1957.	(Name is no longer used)
Kensington Junction		Anzac Parade (reserved track) to Alison Road (reserved track), Randwick 33°54′03.8″S 151°13′22.5″E	Robertson Road	Coogee and Clovelly trams branched from La Perouse and Maroubra trams, which ran via Kensington (outbound). Cross country trams from City Road Junction terminated. (There was a separate junction on the western side of Anzac Parade, to allow access to Dowling St Depot via Dacey Avenue. The separate junction was known as Dacey Avenue Junction.)	Unchanged until 1961	(Name is no longer used) Junction rebuilt at location where L2 and L3 Light Rail lines diverge.
Liverpool Street Junction		Elizabeth Street to Liverpool Street, Sydney 33°52′35.6″S 151°12′34.5″E	(None)	Mainly relevant to earlier (steam tram era) years of the system, when the only tram line through the city ran along Elizabeth Street.	Use of the name was affected by the opening of the nearby Museum station in 1926, but name was still being used into the 1930s. Tram services ceased in 1961	(Name is no longer used)
Macpherson Street Junction	Waverley Junction	Albion Street to Macpherson St, Waverly 33°54′16.3″S 151°15′14.7″E	(None)	Bronte trams diverged from cross-country trams from Bondi Junction to Coogee.	Albion Street side of the junction not used from 1954. Tram service ceased in 1960.	(Name is no longer used)
Marion Street Junction		Norton Street to Marion Street, Leichhardt 33°53′01.6″S 151°09′25.4″E	Leichhardt Town Hall	Abbotsford trams branched from trams on Norton Street (outbound)		(Name is no longer used)
Maroubra Junction		Anzac Parade to Maroubra Road, Maroubra 33°56′29.8″S 151°14′21.6″E	Maroubra Junction	Maroubra Beach trams branched from La Perouse trams (outbound)	Unchanged until 1961	Locality of Maroubra Junction
Middle Head Road Junction		Military Road / Bradleys Head Road to Middle Head Road, Mosman 33°49′54.4″S 151°14′39.6″E	(None)	Balmoral trams branched from Taronga Zoo trams (outbound)	Tram service ceased in 1958	(Name is no longer used)
Mosman Junction	Avenue Road Junction	Military Road to Avenue Road, Mosman 33°49′48.0″S 151°14′39.0″E	(None)	Mosman Wharf trams branched from Taronga Zoo and Balmoral trams (outbound)	Tram service ceased in 1958	Locality of Mosman Junction. Name also used as bus route destination.
Mount Street Junction	Victoria Cross	Miller Street to Pacific Highway, (adjacent to Mount Street), North Sydney 33°50′19.7″S 151°12′24.7″E	(None)	Lane Cove and Chatswood trams branched from Spit, Balmoral, and Northbridge trams (outbound)	Tram service ceased in 1958	(Name is no longer used.) Intersection is still called Victoria Cross, and that name is also used for the nearby Sydney Metro station, Victoria Cross.
Neutral Bay Junction	Wycombe Road Junction	Military Road to Wycombe Street, Neutral Bay 33°49′53.8″S 151°13′20.6″E	Neutral Bay Junc.	Trams from Neutral Bay wharf terminated at Neutral Bay Junction, connecting with other trams.	Wycombe Road side of junction not used after Neutral Bay line closed in 1956. Tram service ceased in 1958.	Locality of Neutral Bay Junction. Name is also used for a bus stand, and a 'via' on bus destination signs.
Newtown Bridge Junction	Newtown Bridge (more commonly used name)	King Street to Enmore Road, Newtown, also to Newtown Tram Depot 33°53′51.2″S 151°10′43.9″E	Newtown Bridge	Trams to St Peters and Cooks River branched from trams to Dulwich Hill and Earlwood (outbound).	Tram service ceased in 1957.	(Name is no longer used)
Quay Street Junction		George Street to Quay Street, Haymarket 33°52′58.0″S 151°12′15.1″E	(None)	Pyrmont trams branched from Parramatta Road and Harris Street (Ryde) trams (outbound)	Not used after Ultimo Depot closed in June 1953, the junction was removed in June 1955.	(Name is no longer used)
Queen Street Junction		Oxford Street to Queen Street, Woollahra 33°53′21.4″S 151°13′58.6″E	(None)	Steam trams to Woollahra branched from trams to Bondi (outbound)	Queen St tram line closed in 1895.	(Name is no longer used)
Railway Road Junction		Princes Highway to Railway Road, Sydenham 33°55′09.2″S 151°10′09.3″E	(None)	Cross country trams to Dulwich Hill branched from trams to Circular Quay (inbound)	Tram service ceased in 1957.	(Name is no longer used)
Randwick Junction	Alison Road Junction	Belmore Road to Cook Street or to reserved track 33°54′46.0″S 151°14′21.8″E	(None)	Trams on cross-country route to Bondi Junction branched from trams to Circular Quay and Railway (Square) (inbound)	Cook Street side of the junction not used from 1954. Tram service ceased in 1960.	Locality of Randwick Junction. The name is also used as a destination or 'via', including on bus destination displays, for bus routes in the area.
Rowntree Street Junction		Darling Street to Rowntree Street, Balmain 33°51′23.3″S 151°10′40.9″E	(None)	Birchgrove trams branched from Darling Street Wharf trams (outbound)	The Rowntree Street side of the junction was not used from 1954.	(Name is no longer used)
Ross Street Junction		Parramatta Road to Ross Street, Forest Lodge 33°53′06.3″S 151°11′04.4″E	(None)			(Name is no longer used)
Rozelle Depot Junction		Reserved track to Lilyfield to reserved track to Rozelle Depot 33°52′41.6″S 151°10′36.8″E	Rozelle Depot	Trams terminated / started at branch to depot. Access to and from depot.	Depot closed in 1958.	(Name is no longer used) Rozelle Depot repurposed as Tramsheds retail centre.
Spit Junction	Spit Road Junction	Military Road and Spit Road, Mosman 33°49′28.2″S 151°14′27.3″E	Spit Road Junction	Trams to the Spit branched from Mosman, Taronga Zoo and Balmoral Trams (outbound)	Tram service ceased in 1958.	Locality of Spit Junction . Name is also used as a school bus route destination.
'Springvale Junction'		Intersection of Botany Road and Beauchamp Road, Banksmeadow 33°57′45.1″S 151°13′08.0″E (Not to be confused with Springvale Junction in Melbourne.)	Botany	'Springvale Junction' was where Botany trams met shuttle trams of the Sprinvale line, which ran further on to La Perouse. It seems that the Springvale line ran back along the Botany route, from Botany terminus, before branching off near a stop called 'Springvale' in the direction of Yarra Junction.	In 1935, the shuttle tram to La Perouse ceased, but from 1934, some trams ran past Botany to Matraville (terminus at Military Road, Matraville).	(Name is no longer used, and the arrangement of the roads in the area is now significantly different around the former site of the tramway.)
Steyne Junction		North Steyne to Raglan Street, Manly 33°47′45.3″S 151°17′15.6″E	(None)	Trams to the point opposite the Spit (via Steyne Junction and the beachfront) branched from trams to Brookvale. Other trams toward the Spit went via Belgrave Street.	Steyne Junction and track along the beachfront were closed in December 1914. Manly tram services ceased altogether in 1939.	(Name is no longer used)
White Bay Junction	Barnes Street Junction	Former Commercial Road and Barnes Street (now Victoria Road), Rozelle / White Bay 33°52′08.6″S 151°10′35.0″E	(None)	Ryde trams branched to Victoria Road (outbound)	Junction not used after 1953.	(Name is no longer used, and intersection vastly changed)
Yarra Junction		Reserved track alongside Bunnerong Road and Anzac Parade, Little Bay 33°58′57.2″S 151°14′10.1″E (Not to be confused with Yarra Junction, Victoria)	(None)	Trams to Botany branched from trams via Anzac Parade to Circular Quay and Railway Square (inbound).	Bunnerong Road ('Springvale') tram line closed beyond Military Road, in 1935, and the junction was no longer used. Yarra Junction was once used as a name for the suburb of Little Bay	(Name is no longer used)

Other tramway junctions that appeared on the 'Diagram of Tramways, Sydney Suburbs 1950' but which were not well known to the public included:

- Addison Road Junction - Enmore Road to Addison Road
- Bourke Street Junction - Bourke Street to Botany Road, Waterloo (for access from Dowling St Depot)
- Crystal Street Junction - Parramatta Road to Crystal Street and Railway Street, Petersham
- Curlewis Street Junction, Curlewis Street to Campbell Parade, Bondi Beach
- Dacey Avenue Junction, Dacey Avenue to Anzac Parade, Kensington (for access from Dowling St Depot)
- Derwent Street Junction
- Foveau Street Junction
- Hay Street Junction
- Harris Street Junction
- Livingston Road Junction
- Meagher Street Junction, Chippendale
- Millers Point Junction, George Street to Alfred Street, Circular Quay
- Newtown Depot Junction, King Street and Enmore Road to Newtown Depot, Newtown
- Ocean and Oxford Streets Junction - Ocean Street to Oxford Steet, Woollahra (for access from Waverley Depot)
- Ocean and Queen Streets Junction - Queen Street to Oxford Steet, Woollarah (for access from Waverley Depot)
- Park Road Junction, Sydney Sports Ground to Anzac Parade, Moore Park (for special event services only)
- St Johns Road Junction
- Randle Street Junction
- Ultimo Road Junction
- Victoria Road Junction - Marrickville Road to Victoria Road, Marrickville
