= Macdonaldtown Carriage Sheds =

Railyard in New South Wales, Australia

Coordinates: 33.89698°S 151.18642°E

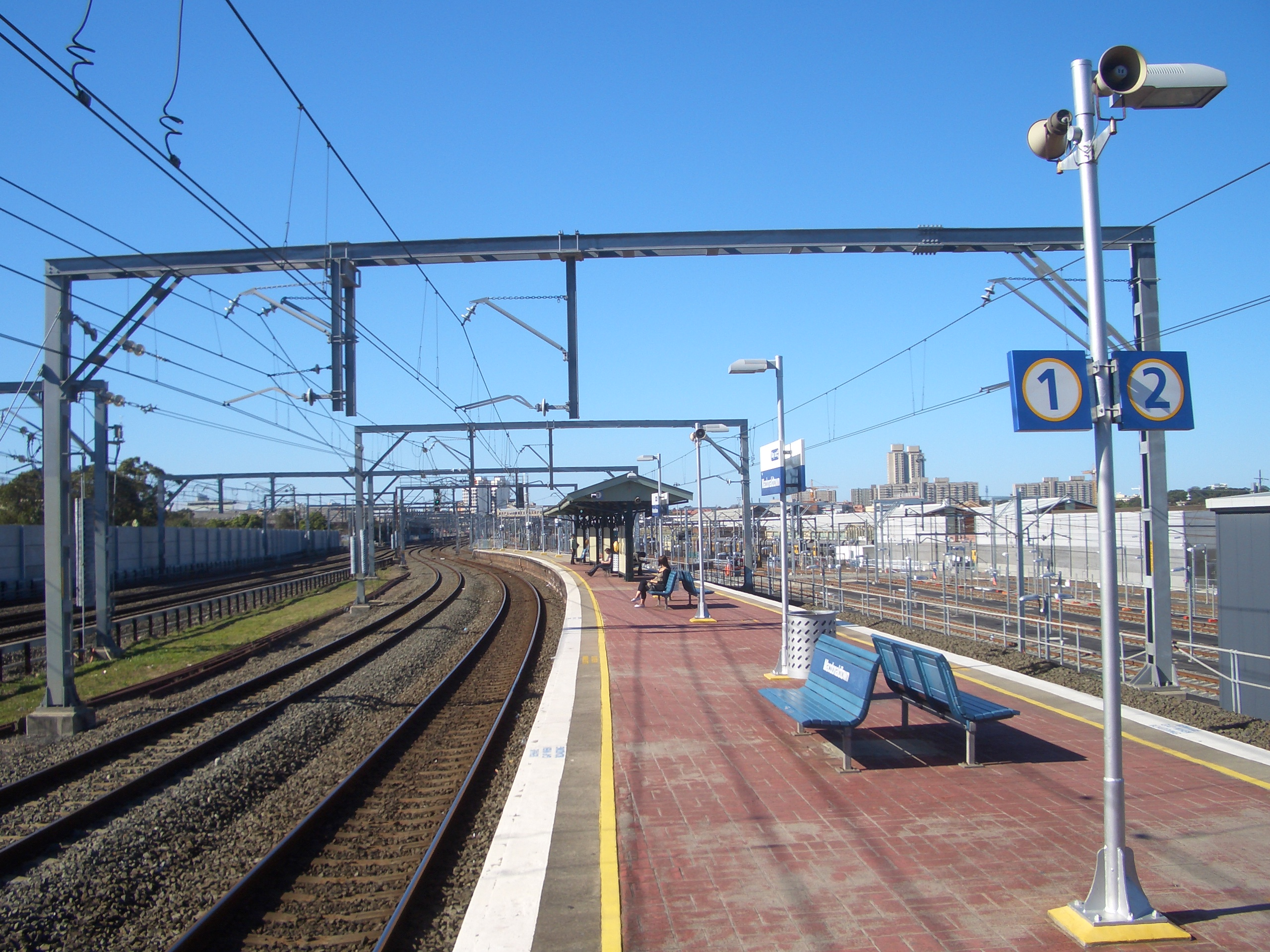
Macdonaldtown station in August 2007 with the newly constructed stabling facility on the right

The Macdonaldtown Carriage Sheds were carriage sheds used for the stabling of passenger carriages used on country railway services in New South Wales, Australia. Built by the New South Wales Government Railways in the inner Sydney suburb of Macdonaldtown, it was located in a triangle between the Main Suburban and Illawarra lines.

By the early 1980s, it was mainly being used to stable withdrawn rolling stock with the New South Wales Rail Transport Museum and Dorrigo Steam Railway & Museum both having stock stored here. It closed in April 1985.

In 2007, six sidings were relaid on the site as part of the CityRail Clearways Project for use as a stabling facility by suburban trains.
