= Macdonaldtown railway station =

Railway station in Sydney, New South Wales, Australia

Macdonaldtown
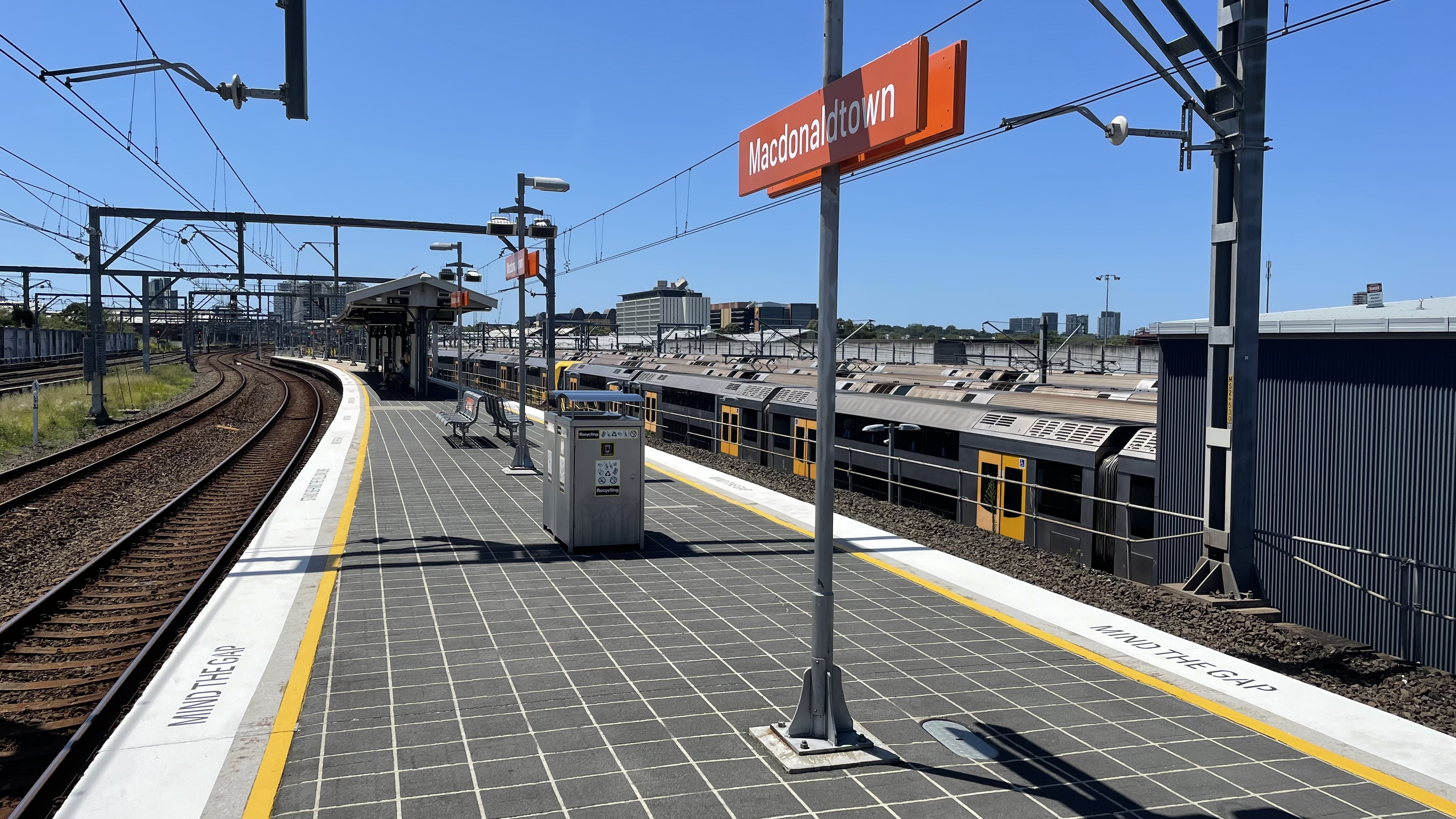
- Eastbound view from Platform 1 in February 2023

General information
- Location: Burren Street, Eveleigh; Sydney, New South Wales; Australia
- Coordinates: 33°53′48″S 151°11′11″E
- Elevation: 27 metres (89 ft)
- Owner: Transport Asset Manager of NSW
- Operator: Sydney Trains
- Line: Main Suburban
- Distance: 2.48 km (1.54 mi) from Central
- Platforms: 2 (1 island)
- Tracks: 6

Construction
- Structure type: Elevated
- Accessible: No

Other information
- Status: Weekdays: Staffed: 6am to 2pm: Weekends and public holidays: Unstaffed
- Station code: MAC
- Website: Transport for NSW

History
- Opened: 1878 (148 years ago)
- Rebuilt: 3 April 1892 (134 years ago)
- Electrified: Yes (from 1928)

Passengers
- 2025: 618,857 (year); 1,695 (daily) (Sydney Trains)
- Rank: 148

Services
Preceding station	Sydney Trains	Following station
Newtown towards Parramatta or Leppington	Leppington & Inner West Line	Redfern towards City Circle
Newtown towards Liverpool	Liverpool & Inner West Line	Redfern towards City Circle
North Shore & Western Line does not stop here
Northern Line does not stop here
Location

Macdonaldtown railway station is a suburban railway station located on the Main Suburban line, serving the Sydney suburb of Eveleigh. It is served by Sydney Trains T2 Leppington & Inner West Line and occasional T3 Liverpool & Inner West Line services.

== History ==
The original Macdonaldtown station opened in 1878 at a site adjacent to the Charles Street subway. It was relocated to its present site on 3 April 1892.

The Main Suburban line through Macdonaldtown was quadruplicated in 1892, and sextuplicated in 1927 in association with electrification works.

An island platform on the middle pair of tracks was taken out of use and demolished in November 1985. The closed access stairs to this may still be seen from the underpass entrance. To the south of the station, lie the Macdonaldtown Stabling Yards. A footbridge that spanned all six lines was removed in June 1996.

On the morning of 13 July 1986 Macdonaldtown station was painted pink by then 18 year-old John Philip Baxter and his 14-year-old brother. Baxter also glued a table, two chairs and a pot-plant (also painted pink) to the platform to further his "overall effort to enhance the station". No conviction was recorded and the State Rail Authority's claim for damages was rejected by the magistrate.

== Services ==
=== Platforms ===
Platform	Line	Stopping pattern	Notes
1	T2	services to Central & the City Circle	
1	T3	services to Central & the City Circle (weekday early morning, late night and weekends only)	
2	T2	services to Homebush & Parramatta	
2	T3	services to Liverpool via Regents Park (weekday early morning, late night and weekends only)	

== Gallery ==
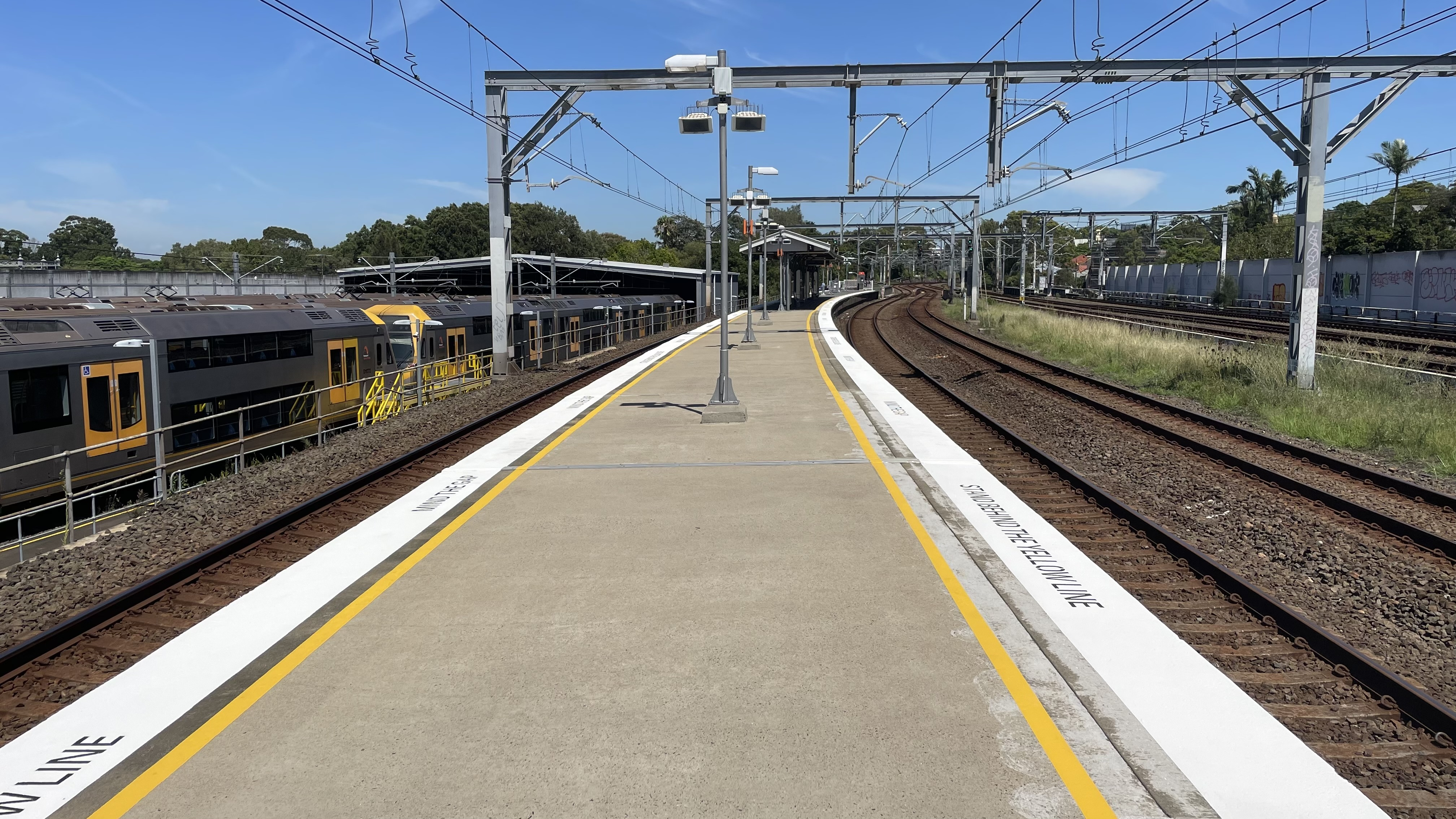
Westbound view from the island platform

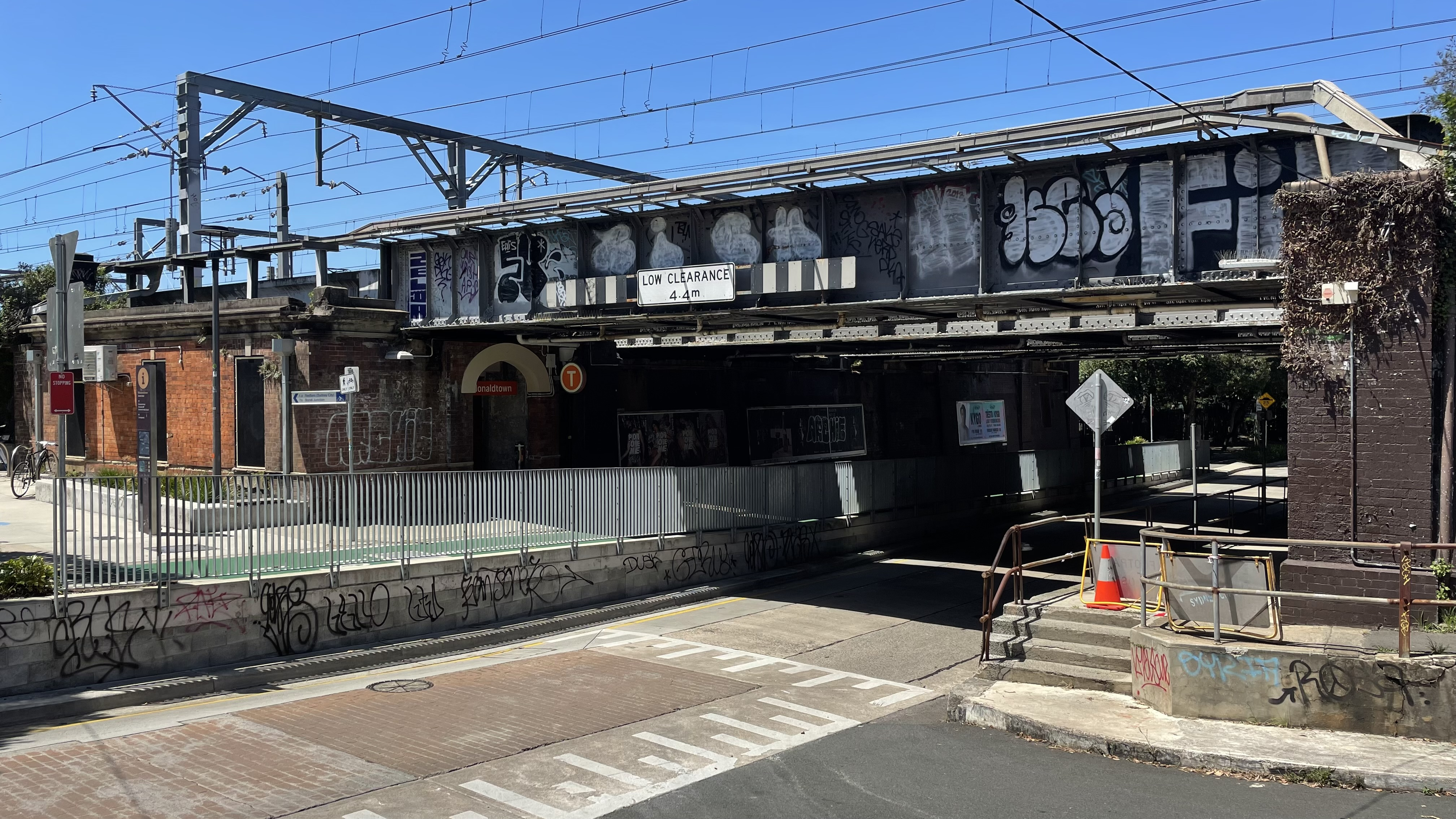
Entrance from Burren Street underpass
