= Newtown Tram Depot =

Tramway depot in Australia

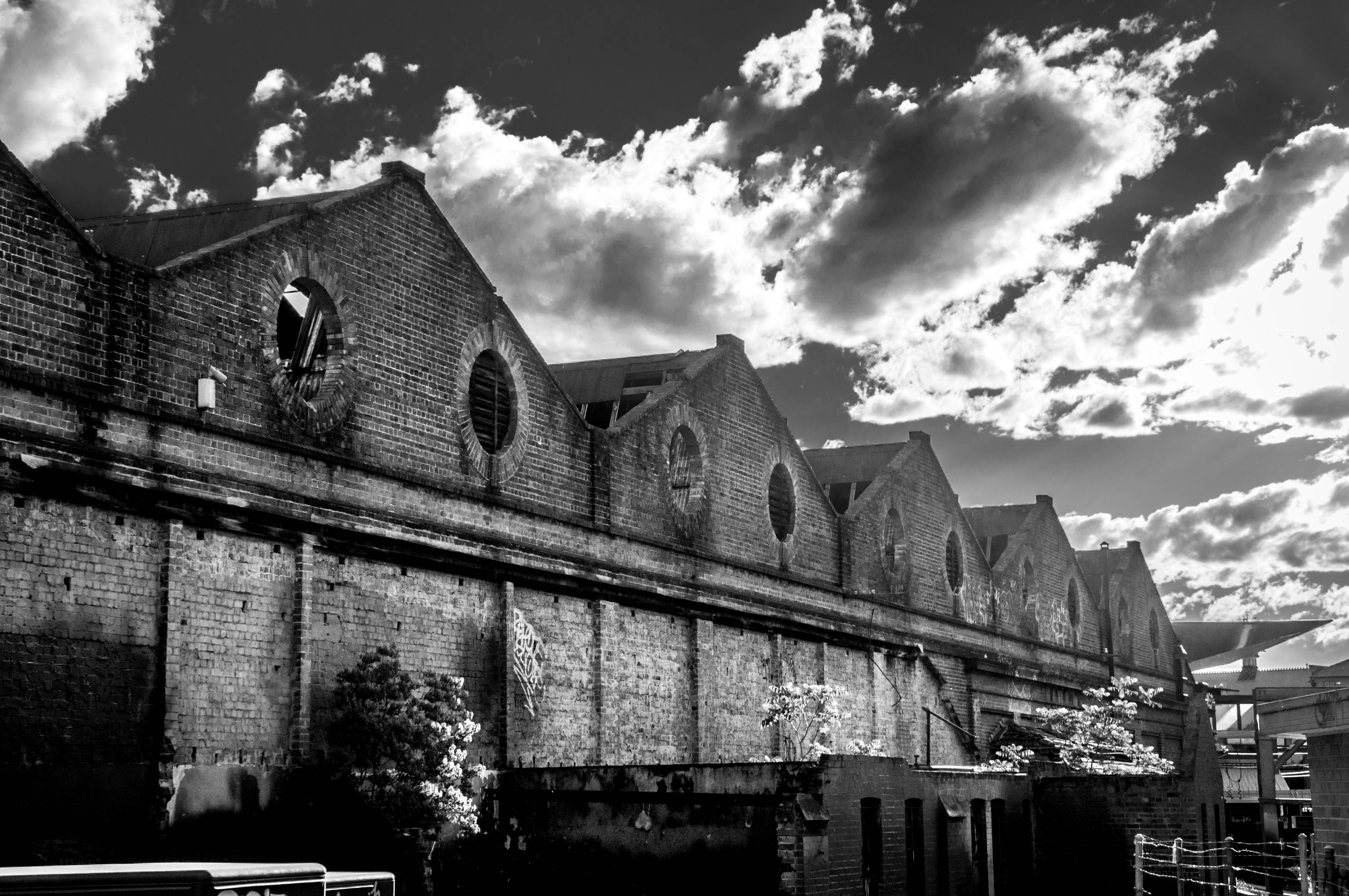
- Interactive map of Newtown Tram Depot

Location
- Location: King Street, Newtown
- Coordinates: 33°53′54″S 151°10′51″E

Characteristics
- Operator: New South Wales Tramways
- Type: Electric

History
- Opened: 1 April 1900; 126 years ago
- Closed: 28 September 1957; 68 years ago

Newtown Tram Depot is a heritage-listed former tram depot in King Street, Newtown, City of Sydney, New South Wales, Australia. It was part of the Sydney tram network. The tram depot and Newtown railway station were jointly added to the New South Wales State Heritage Register on 2 April 1999.

== History ==
Newtown Tram Depot opened on 1 April 1900 adjacent to Newtown railway station on King Street, Newtown. It initially provided trams on the Glebe Point, Canterbury, Earlwood and Summer Hill lines. It closed on 28 September 1957.

It is the oldest remaining tram depot in Sydney that has survived in its original form.

It contained:

- Tram Storage Shed (1899), with its own distinctive parapet design
- Tram Traffic Offices (1900), additional floor c.1914
- Main Tram Track Area (1899), series of 16 tram tracks fanning out from two tracks at King Street, removed
- Secondary Tram Yard (1899), demolished

The property was transferred from the NSW Department of Government Transport to the NSW Department of Railways in 1960 and the depot was gutted of its trackwork and tramway fixtures. The site was subsequently used variously for bus parking, private tenancies and railway uses, but is now vacant. It was subject to a road reservation zoning for many years.

The depot sits alongside Newtown railway station. Part of the depot's forecourt was redeveloped and opened to the public in 2012 as part of an upgrade to the station. This area now acts as the entrance to the station concourse. The main depot building remains derelict.

== Surviving features ==
=== Tram Storage Shed (1899) ===
This is essentially a large single storey structure with a major internal storage space and flanked on the north and south by small single storey annexes. Construction is of load bearing English bond face brickwork with attached piers to all four facades, the open end is supported now by steel RSJ posts and in-filled with corrugated steel vertical sheets on steel frames. The north and south brick gables enclose the iron sawtooth roof structure and has a series of large circular vents bordered by polychromatic brickwork.

The vents enclosing the interior roof structure are fitted with timber louvres while the adjoining ones are completely open. Windows to the south-west areas of the facade, in the area of the converter room, are generally steel-framed with cement rendered external surrounds. The main roof is of corrugated steel and the skylights are of original wire-reinforced glass in steel glazing bars, except where the roof is fire-damaged.

The annex buildings, where they have survived in near original form, are constructed of face brickwork in Flemish Bond with timber windows. The roofs are clad with unglazed terracotta tiles in Marseilles pattern, generally in a hipped form. Exterior detailing includes the use of bricks of special profile to give an ogee to the lower course under a window or an elegant scotia to the lower edge of an abutment.

The interior of the main spaces are formed by the iron framed sawtooth roofing, supported on four arcades of cast iron circular columns. The northernmost row has had most of the columns replaced with fabricated welded steel RSJ posts. The surrounding walls are painted brickwork. The riveted frames are constructed of lightly framed roof principals spanning between lattice girders bracketed off stub posts, over the tops of the main columns. The floors are largely of reinforced concrete, or similar, with a long vehicle ramp at the west end in the centre. There are considerable areas of missing roofing (the total enclosed area of the former battery and converter rooms is roofless).

Former Battery Room (to the south-east corner)

Built and partitioned within brick walls to roof for a battery room in 1914 as part of the system associated with the large sub-station installed. Roofing material is now completely removed.

Former Converter Room (to the south-east corner)

Built 1914 as a substation occupying the same space as an earlier small sub-station. All equipment has been removed except for the overhead crane 6 tonne overhead crane which remains on its track. The substantial foundations for the rotary converters and the steel reinforced concrete sub floor remain. Roofing material is now completely removed.

Former Meal Room (to the south-east corner)

Built shortly after opening of the tram depot in 1900 it remains largely intact as a single room accessed by a flight of stairs.

Staff Amenities Room and Passage (to the south-east corner)

Built early 20th century to supplement the original meal room. The ceilings have been completely removed from this area.

Toilet Wing (to the northern elevation)

Built as original staff toilets, now semi-demolished with no roof and the access from the tram shed bricked-up.

Electrical Stores (to the northern elevation)

Built originally as stores and offices but now mostly demolished.

=== Tram Offices (1900) ===
Originally built in 1900 as tram traffic offices with attached toilets in the Federation Period style with a single storey only. In c. 1914 another floor was added in a similar manner for additional office space. The building is constructed from English bond brickwork with a hipped form roof clad with Marseilles terracotta tiles. There are timber-framed double-hung windows, and a timber bracketed terracotta tiled awning survives at first floor level while the ground floor veranda has been removed. The attached toilet block has a skillion roof behind brick parapets. The veranda to the north of the 1900 building has an open deck of concrete on a brick base; the timber veranda has now been demolished. The single storey offices to the west were originally built c. 1905 as offices in Flemish Bond brickwork with red "rubbing" brick voussoirs over the windows and doors. The building is now semi-derelict as the roof has been removed.

All of the ground floor offices are now used as storage areas. They have timber floors, painted brick walls (which were originally plastered) and a plaster ceiling with the original cornices intact. The stair hall to the eastern end was originally part of the offices but converted c.1914 to give access to the first floor. The stair is of timber construction with original boarded wall on the ground floor to the old storeroom. The open passage to the east of the stair is a concrete paved access way to the attached brick toilet block, which is reached by a steel stair. The offices on the first floor have timber floors, painted brick walls (which were originally plastered) and a plaster ceiling with the original cornices intact. Each of the rooms has an original fireplace. The easternmost room has been converted into a bath room with a tiled floor and shower bath.

=== Main Tram Track Area (1899) ===
This large open area was formed in 1899 with a series of 16 tram tracks fanning out from two tracks at King Street. Now partly paved over there is evidence of much of the original tram tracks remaining particularly obvious on the northern boundary with the railway line. A boundary wall on Railway Lane is part of the 1918 railway institute building (now demolished) while the other boundary brick wall is an original retaining wall. The main sewer line connecting to the station travels in a north–south direction from the station platform across the site to Railway Lane.

=== Secondary Tram Yard (1899) ===
This is a slightly smaller yard leading off Angel Street which contains a later railway signal and communications building but now is virtually vacant. This area is accessed through chain wire gates from the street. It may contain the foundations of a number of buildings which were once on the site including the Mortuary Station, stables and Blacksmith's shop. It also was on the north frontage of the tram storage shed with amenities and the electrical stores.

== Design ==
Design features including:

- 16 tracks
- Plain front parapet
- East roof orientation

== Heritage listing ==
The former Newtown tram depot has state historical significance as it formed an integral part of the electrification of the NSW tramway system which commenced in 1899. Being the second of the tram depots built to service the new electric tram fleet the buildings, it represents the high level of commitment by the government to providing a mass electric transit system service for Sydney's suburbs at the start of the 20th century.

The tram depot site and its buildings are representative of the typical electric tram depot layout constructed as part of the NSW tramway system. The large tram shed and the associated tram offices exemplify the common architectural style of the NSW tramway buildings built during and just after the time of Federation. It is considered rare as it is one of the few NSW tramway buildings to survive and it is the oldest in essentially its original form.

Newtown Tramway Depot was listed on the New South Wales State Heritage Register on 2 April 1999 having satisfied the following criteria.

The place is important in demonstrating the course, or pattern, of cultural or natural history in New South Wales.

Built to service the new electric tram fleet, the former Tram Depot at Newtown is of state historical significance for its association with the replacement of steam trams with electric traction in Sydney in 1899. Opened in 1900 the tram depot was the second built of the tram depots in NSW and together with the adjacent Newtown Railway Station represented in the late 1890s the coming of an integrated suburban transit system for Sydney.

The place is important in demonstrating aesthetic characteristics and/or a high degree of creative or technical achievement in New South Wales.

The tram storage shed at the former Tram Depot at Newtown is an attractive building of significant size, is well known in the community, and being highly visible from the railway line, Newtown Station and Erskineville Road has landmark qualities. The common architecture of the tramway buildings at the time, of which Newtown is an example, described loosely as the Federation style is exemplified in the main building and the adjacent tram offices.

The place has a strong or special association with a particular community or cultural group in New South Wales for social, cultural or spiritual reasons.

The place has the potential to contribute to the local community's sense of place and can provide a connection to the local community's history.

The place has potential to yield information that will contribute to an understanding of the cultural or natural history of New South Wales.

Based upon existing documentary evidence there is potential for the Former Tram Depot site to contain archaeological remains likely to contribute to a further understanding of early 20th century living and working conditions in the Newtown area. The site and the open yard areas also have potential to reveal information relating to early 20th century tram and electric power generation history.

The place possesses uncommon, rare or endangered aspects of the cultural or natural history of New South Wales.

The former Tram Depot at Newtown is one of few such buildings of the NSW tramway system that survive in Sydney and is the oldest in its original form.

The place is important in demonstrating the principal characteristics of a class of cultural or natural places/environments in New South Wales.

The site and buildings of the former Newtown Tram Depot are representative of the electric tram depot layout and design typical of the NSW tramway system. They generally represent the high level of government commitment to the provision of mass electric transport to Sydney's suburbs at the start of the 20th century.

== Gallery ==
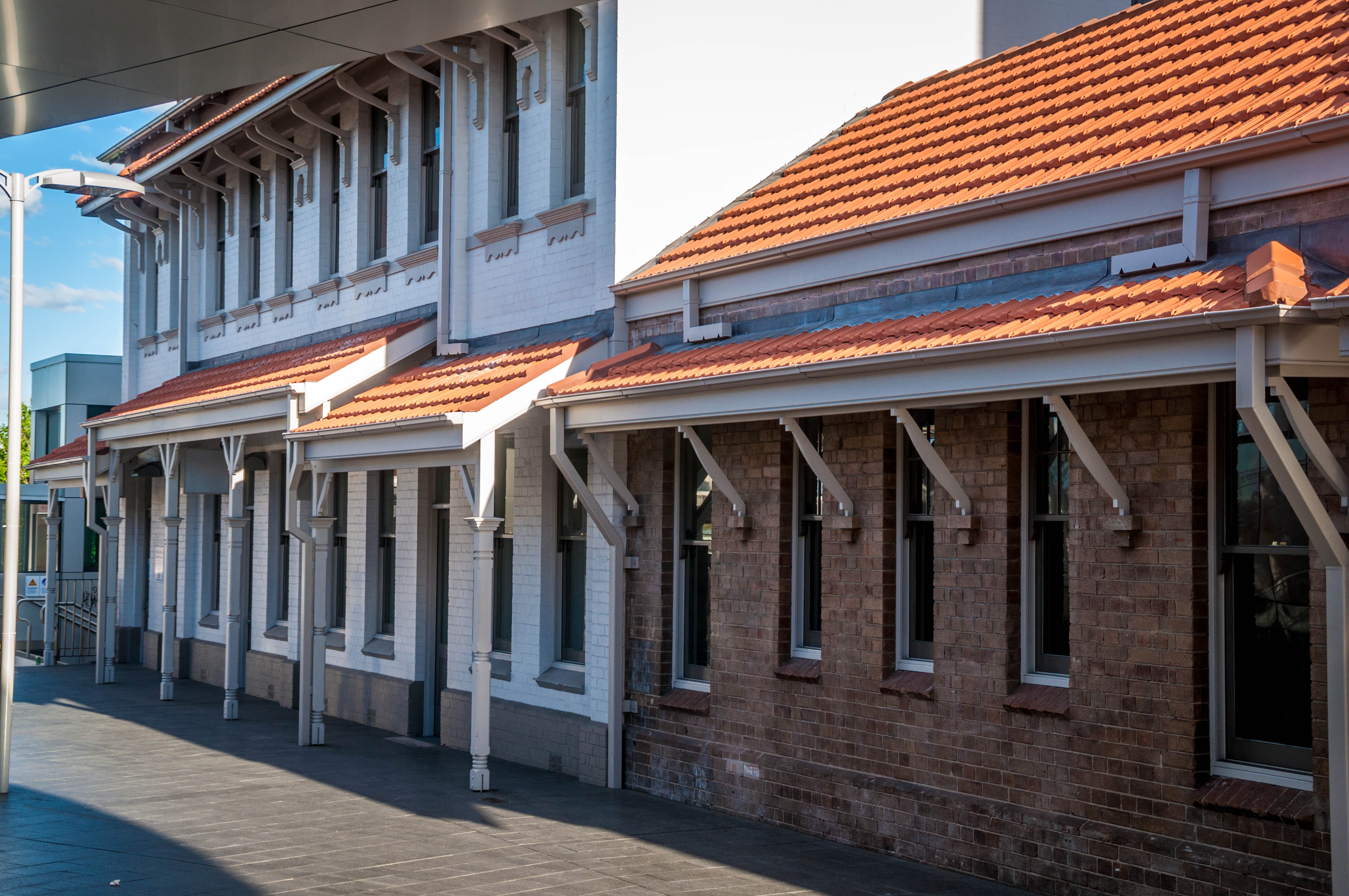
Tram Traffic Offices

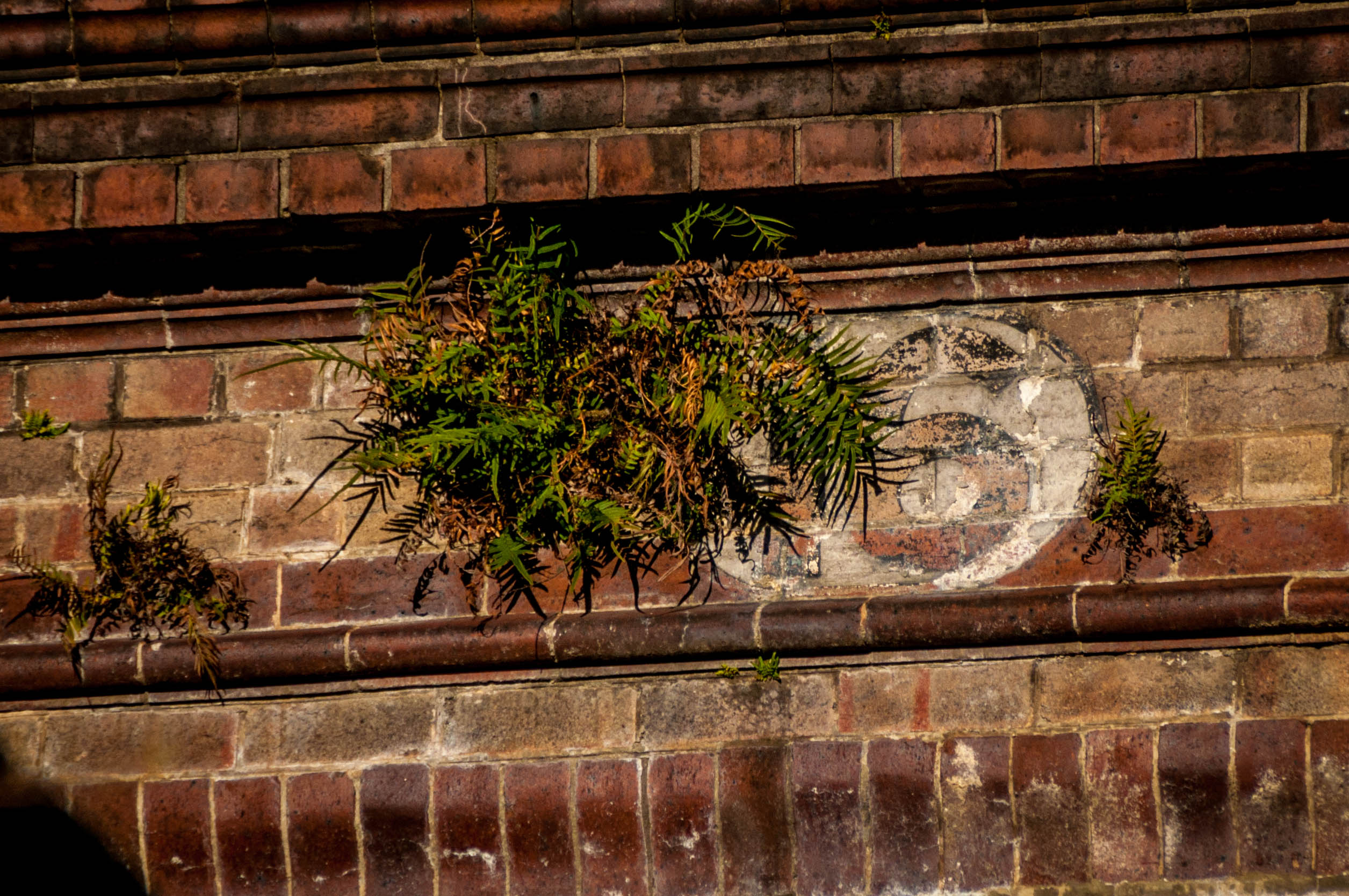
Track 16

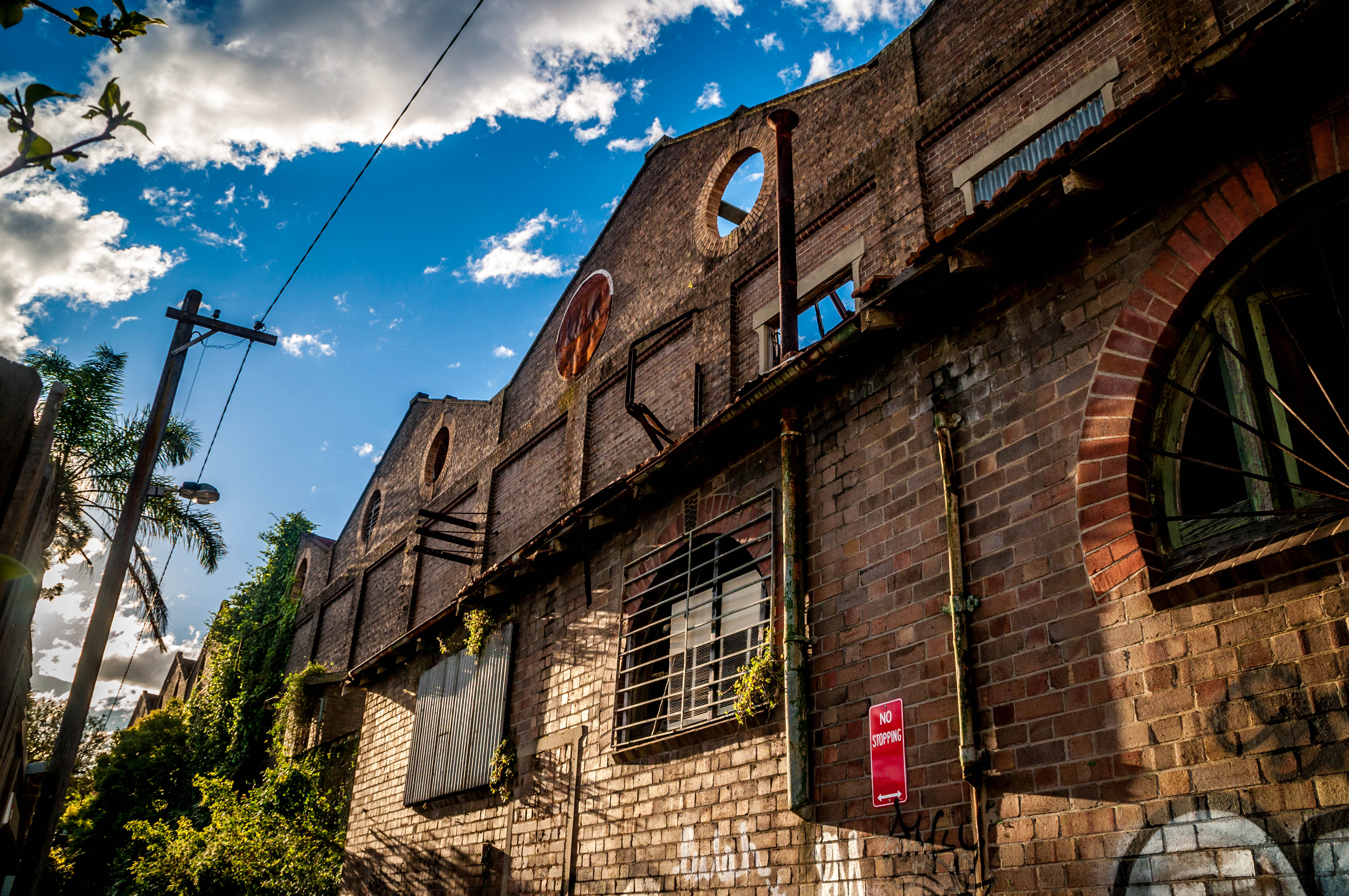
South Wall

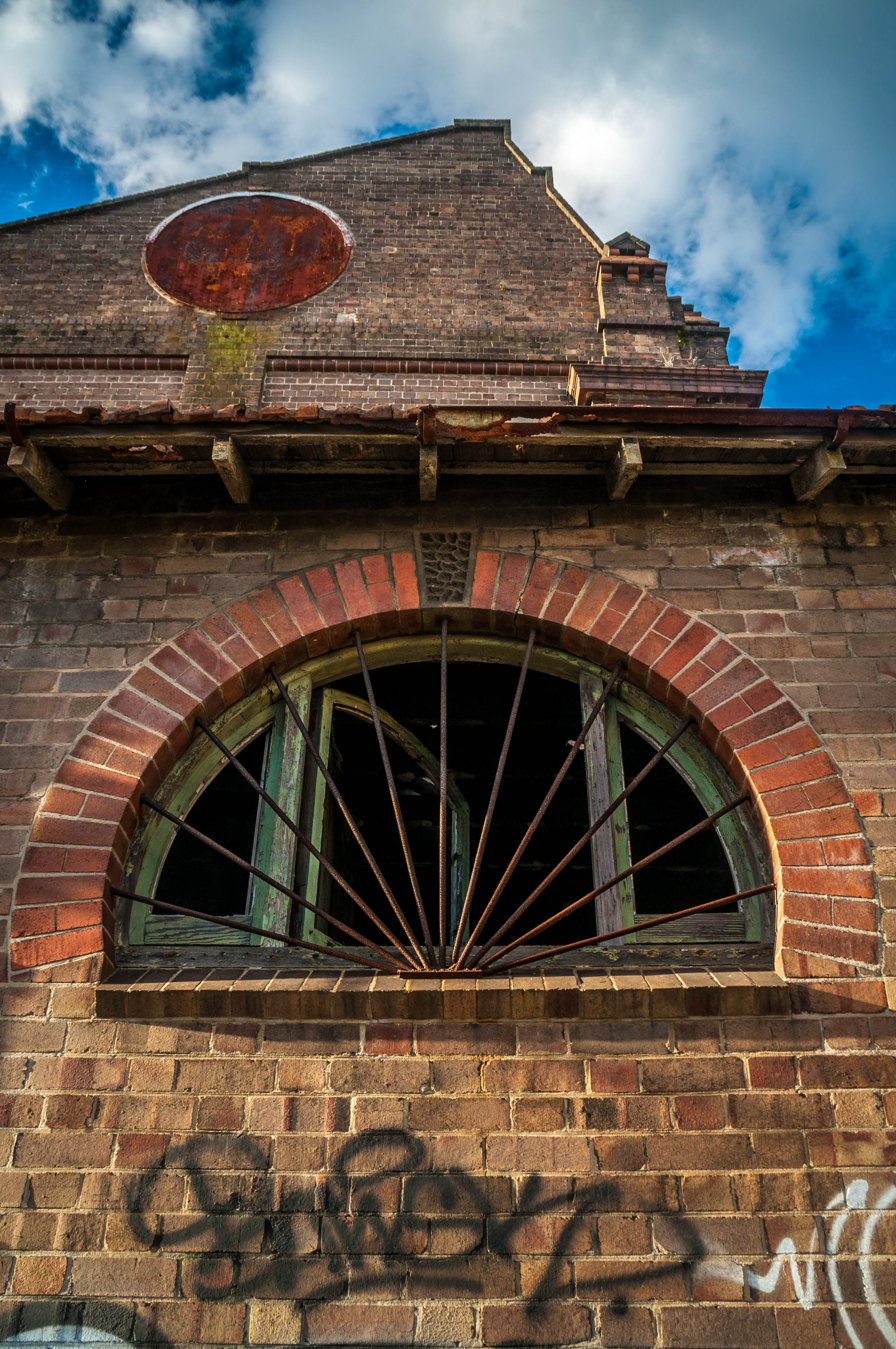
Windows

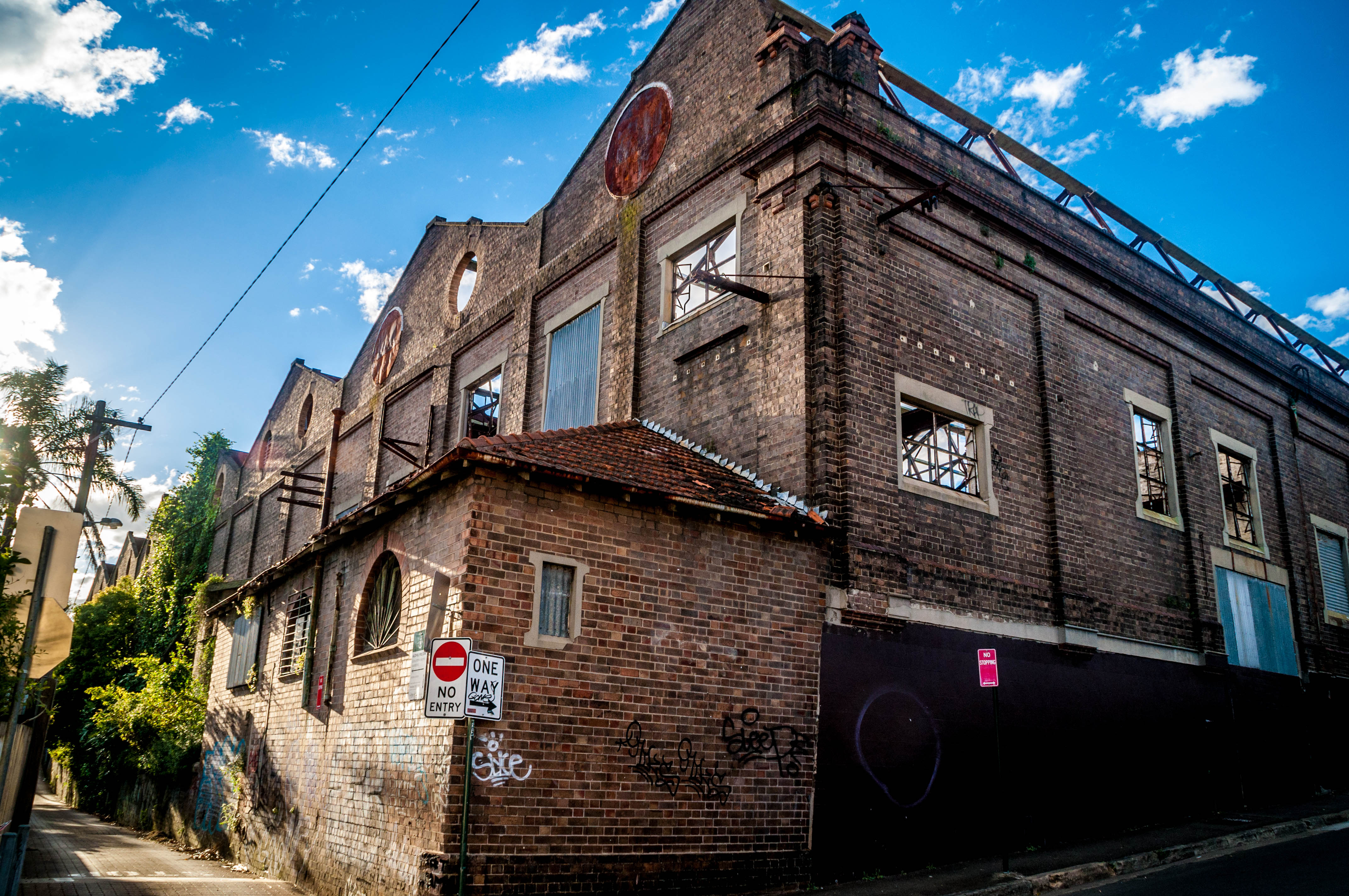
South East Corner

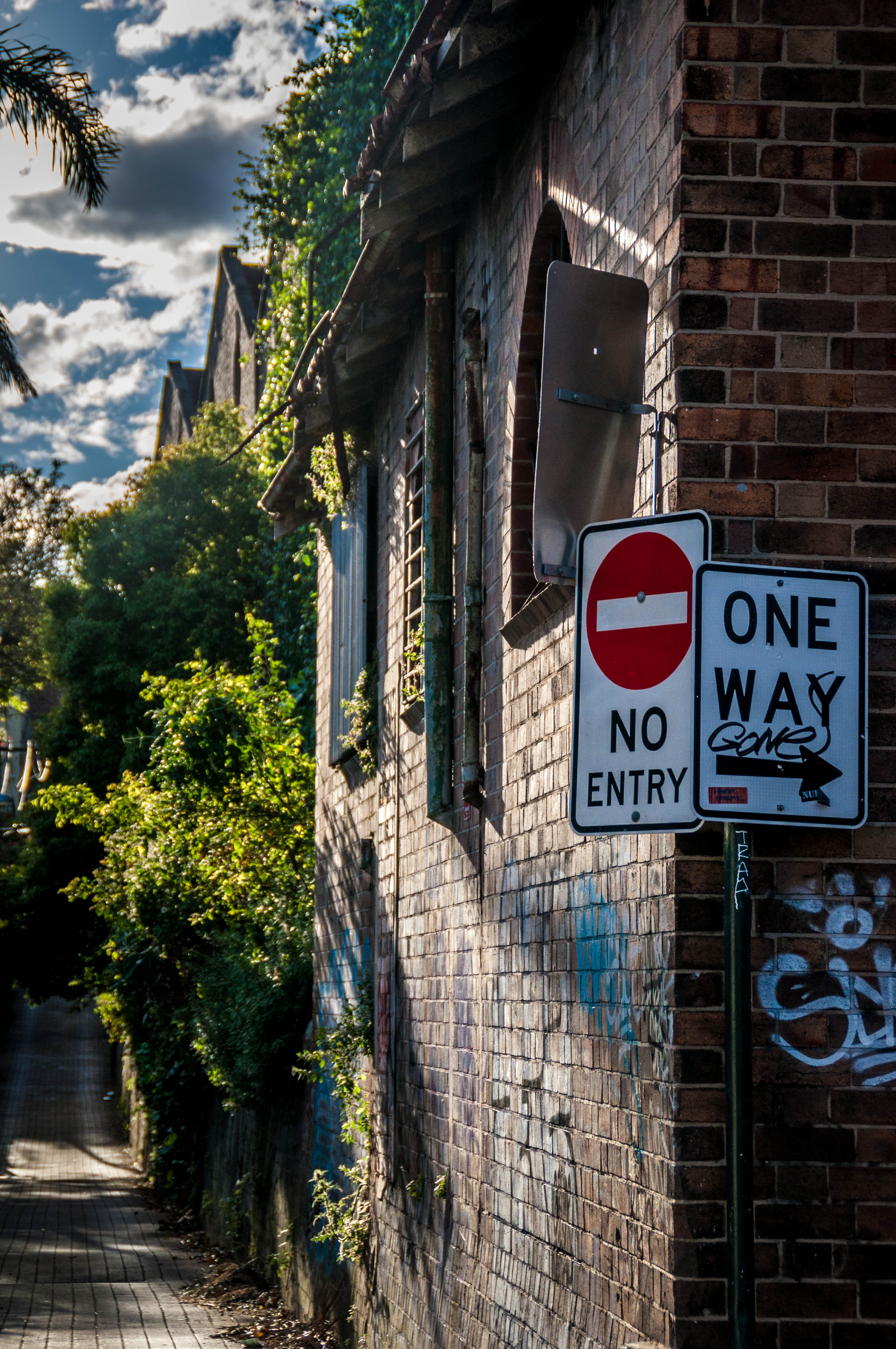
Railway Lane

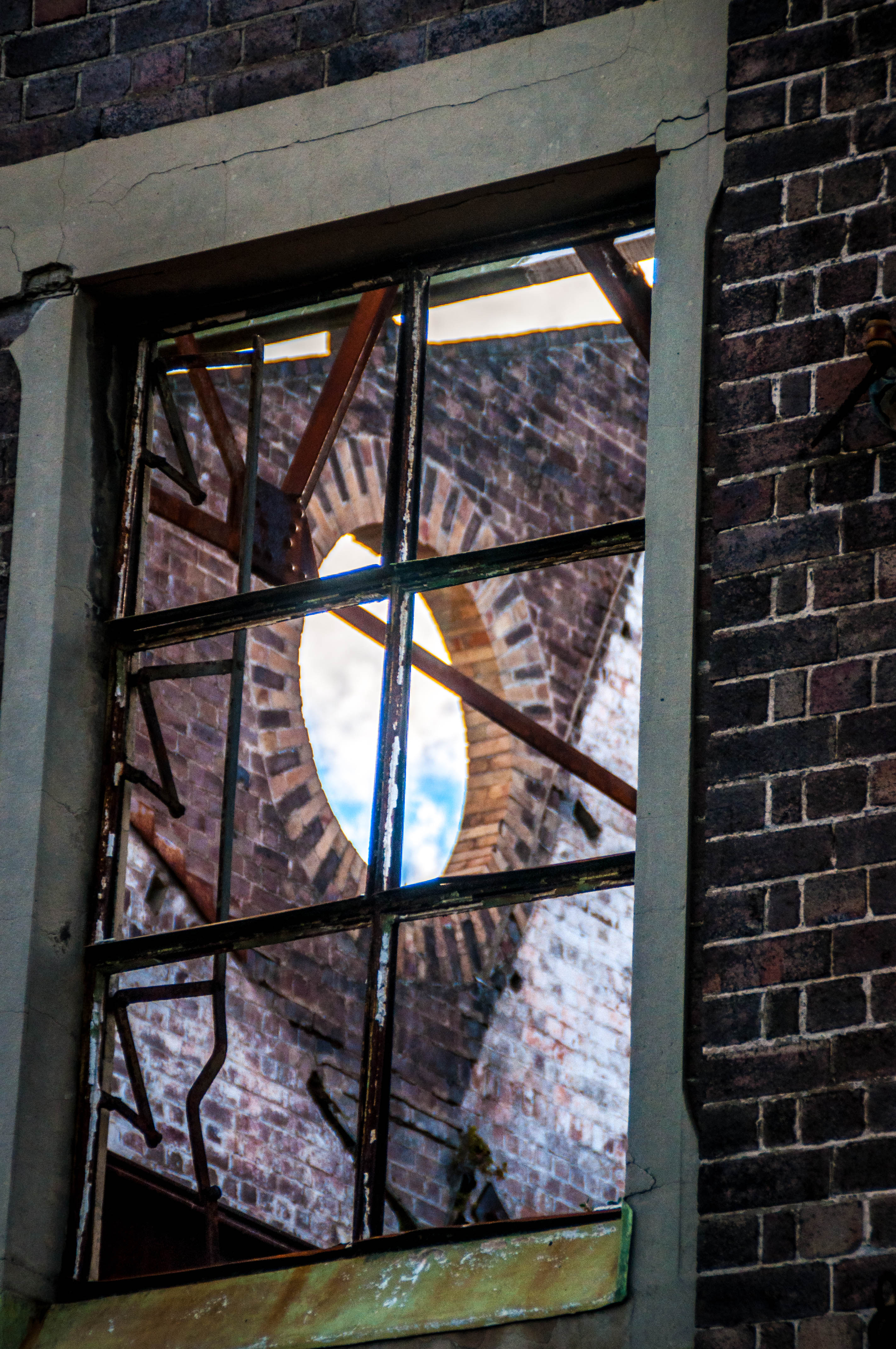
Window and Ventilator

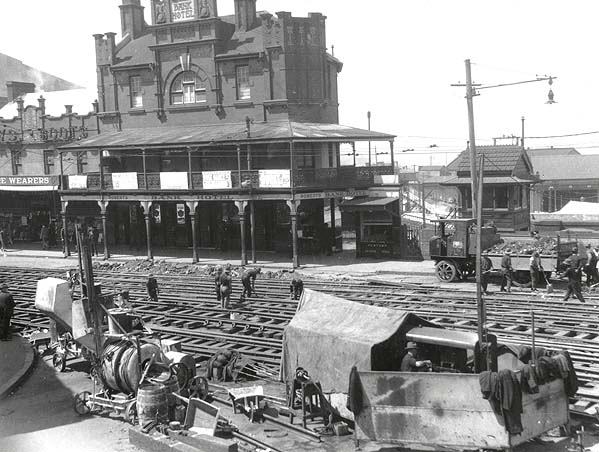
Relaying tram tracks in Newtown 1927

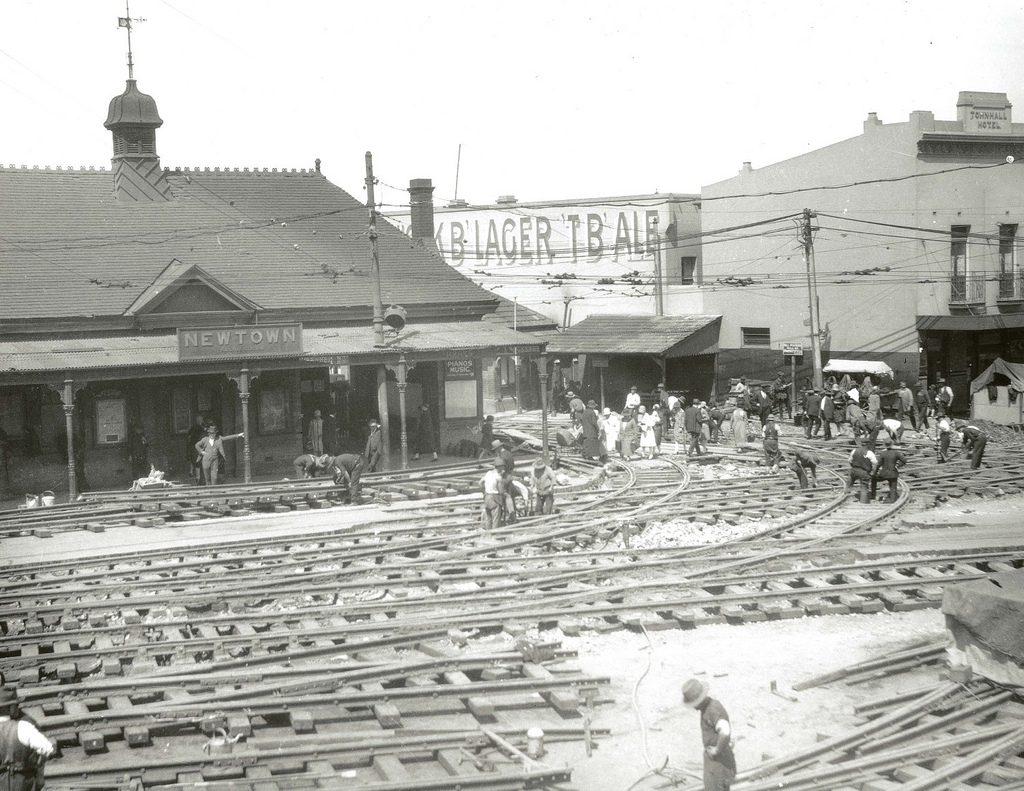
Laying tracks in Newtown 1927
