= Newtown railway station, Sydney =

Railway station in Sydney, New South Wales, Australia

Newtown
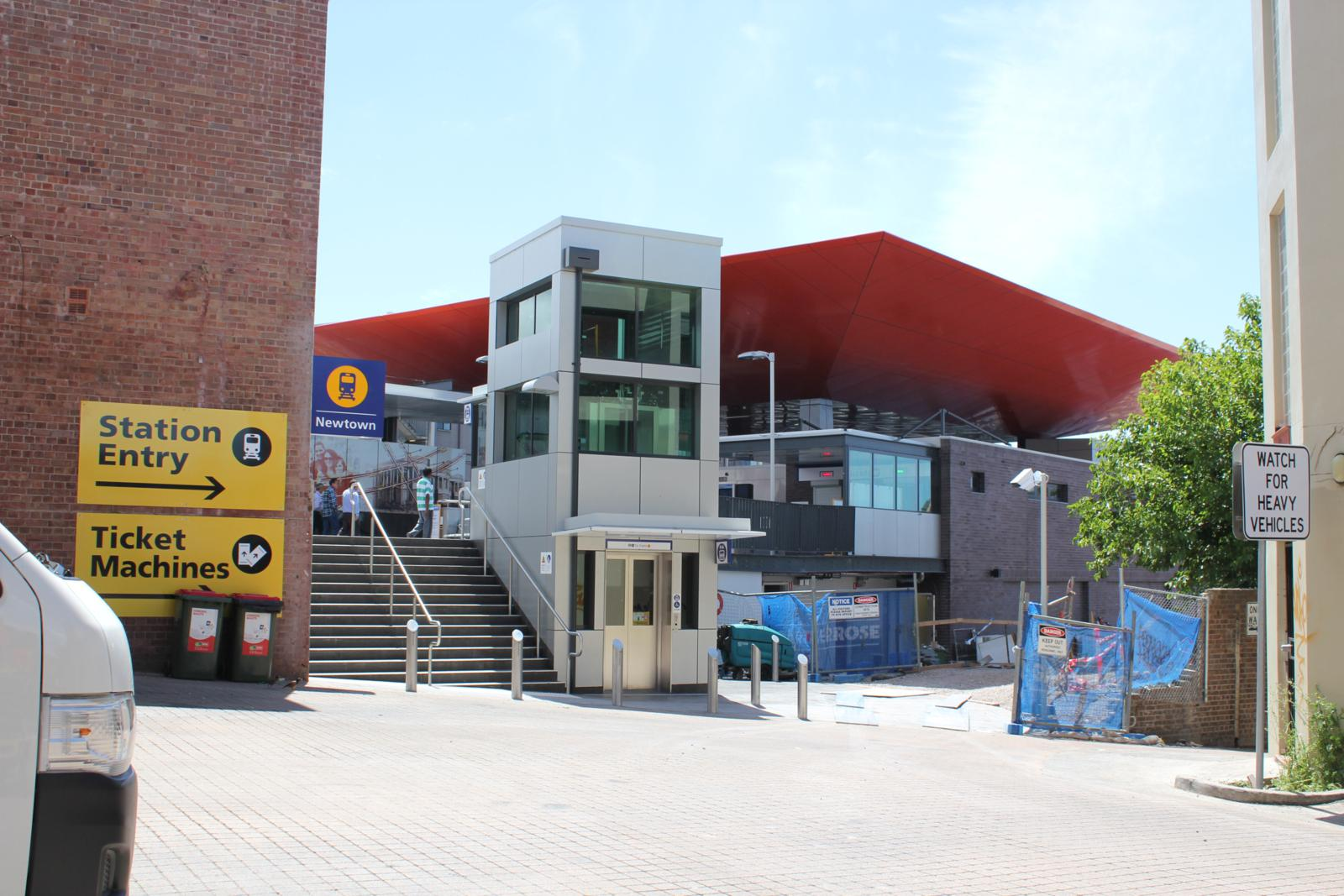
- Main station entrance and building in December 2012

General information
- Location: King Street, Newtown; Sydney, New South Wales; Australia
- Coordinates: 33°53′53″S 151°10′46″E
- Elevation: 37 metres (121 ft)
- Owner: Transport Asset Manager of NSW
- Operator: Sydney Trains
- Line: Main Suburban
- Distance: 3.1 km (1.9 mi) from Central
- Platforms: 2 (1 island)
- Tracks: 6
- Connections: Bus

Construction
- Structure type: Ground
- Accessible: Yes

Other information
- Status: Weekdays: Staffed: 6am–10pm: Weekends and public holidays: Staffed: 6am–10pm
- Station code: NTN
- Website: Transport for NSW

History
- Opened: 26 September 1855 (171 years ago)
- Rebuilt: 10 January 1892 (134 years ago); 29 May 1927 (99 years ago); 29 October 2012 (13 years ago)
- Electrified: Yes (from 1928)

Passengers
- 2025: 6,005,333 (year); 16,453 (daily) (Sydney Trains)
- Rank: 26

Services
Preceding station	Sydney Trains	Following station
Stanmore towards Parramatta or Leppington	Leppington & Inner West Line	Macdonaldtown towards City Circle
Ashfield towards Leppington	Leppington & Inner West Line Express	Redfern towards City Circle
Stanmore towards Liverpool	Liverpool & Inner West Line	Macdonaldtown towards City Circle
Ashfield towards Liverpool	Liverpool & Inner West Line Express (Weekdays only)	Redfern towards City Circle
North Shore & Western Line does not stop here
Northern Line does not stop here

New South Wales Heritage Register
- Official name: Newtown Railway Station group and Former Newtown Tramway Depot
- Type: State heritage (built)
- Designated: 2 April 1999
- Reference no.: 1213
- Type: Railway Platform / Station
- Category: Transport – Rail
- Builders: Department of Railways
Location

Newtown railway station is a heritage-listed suburban railway station located on the Main Suburban line, serving the Sydney suburb of Newtown. It is served by Sydney Trains T2 Leppington & Inner West Line and T3 Liverpool & Inner West Line services. The railway station and the Newtown Tram Depot were jointly added to the New South Wales State Heritage Register on 2 April 1999.

== History ==
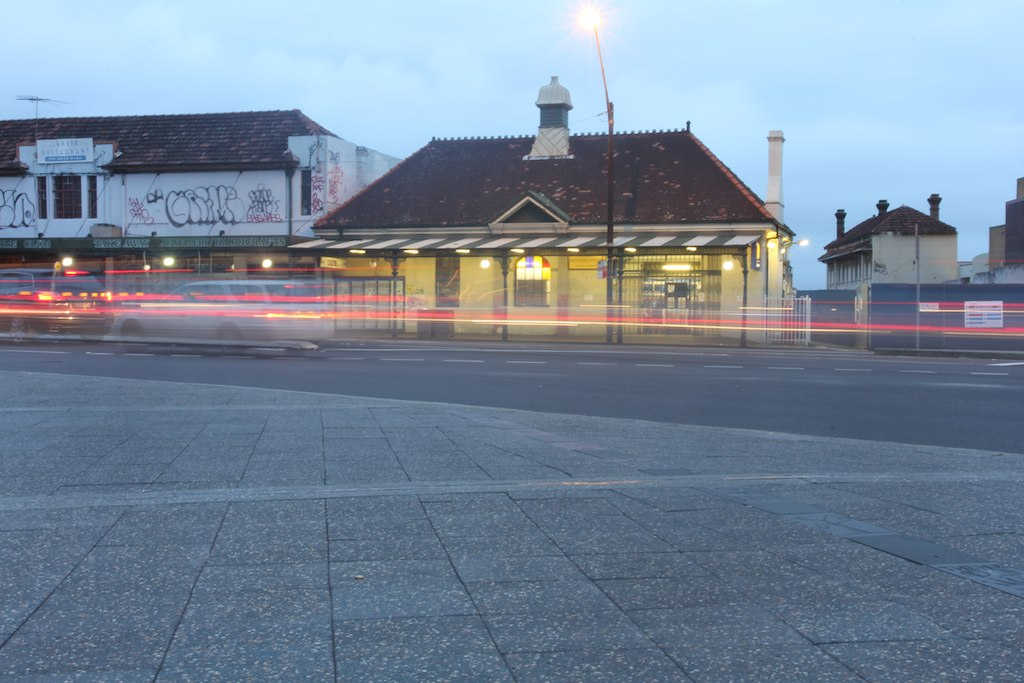
Former station entrance in January 2011

The original Newtown station opened on 26 September 1855 with the opening of the Main Suburban line. It was located to the west of King Street, about where the former Crago's Flour Mills now stand. Mortuary facilities were provided from 1875.

The line through Newtown was quadruplicated in 1892, and a new station was built at the present location. This station consisted of two side platforms and an island platform in the centre. The site of the original station became a goods yard.

In 1927 the line was further expanded to six tracks (four with electrification) and Newtown Station was demolished and replaced by the present station which served only the up and down local tracks. The new station was opened on 29 May 1927. The original overhead booking office was retained and its platform access was modified to serve only this new platform. The bookstall for NSW Bookstall was constructed in 1937. In c. 1975 the original roof of the platform building was removed and replaced with a lower profile roof. In 1989 the station was refurbished.

On 29 October 2012, a new entrance to the station was opened, constructed as part of a major upgrade to the station and surrounding precinct. The upgrade work included demolition of the existing platform building, replacing the platform surface and canopies, and the construction of a new concourse featuring lifts and enhanced stair access to the platform.

The existing access to the platform, via a single narrow flight of stairs connected to a heritage entrance building on King Street, was closed but retained as an emergency exit. Several buildings were refurbished and converted to retail use, including the former entrance building.

== Services ==
=== Platforms ===
Platform	Line	Stopping pattern	Notes
1	Leppington & Inner West Line	services to Central & the City Circle	
1	Liverpool & Inner West Line	services to Central & the City Circle	
2	Leppington & Inner West Line	services to Homebush, Leppington & Parramatta	
2	Liverpool & Inner West Line	services to Liverpool via Regents Park	

=== Transport links ===
Transdev John Holland operates three bus routes via Newtown station, under contract to Transport for NSW:

- 352: Bondi Junction station to Marrickville Metro via Taylor Square
- 355: Bondi Junction station to Marrickville Metro via Waterloo
- 370: Coogee to Glebe Point

Transit Systems operates seven bus routes via Newtown station, under contract to Transport for NSW:

- 422: Railway Square to Kogarah
- 423: Martin Place to Kingsgrove
- 423X: Martin Place to Kingsgrove limited stops
- 426: Martin Place to Dulwich Hill
- 428: Martin Place to Canterbury
- 428X: Martin Place to Canterbury limited stops
- 430: Sydenham station to Martin Place

Newtown station is also served by three NightRide routes:

- N10: Sutherland station to Town Hall station
- N30: Macarthur station to Town Hall station
- N40: East Hills station to Town Hall station

== Description ==
=== Configuration ===
The station features a single island platform located in a shallow cutting, served by one pair of tracks. The entrance is adjacent to a small public plaza located just off King Street. The area used to be the forecourt of the former Newtown Tram Depot, the tram shed lies disused to the east of the station entrance.

=== Overhead booking office and station concourse (1892) ===
The overhead booking office is constructed in English bond brickwork. On the King Street elevation, the brick walls are painted and have a cement rendered coating about 1500mm high along the footpath. Decorative engaged pilasters remain on either side of the original opening. The south and east elevations have been completely rendered. The hipped roof is covered in shingle terracotta tiles and surmounted at the centre by a square louvre-vented bellcote, which is clad with ribbed lead, and capped by a helmet dome. The finial from the top of the dome is missing. The eastern side of the hip (where the building meets Bridge House) is clad in corrugated steel roofing. A chimney is built at both ends and at the north this abuts the adjoining 'Bridge House.'

The timber-framed windows are Edwardian double hung sash windows with large glass panes to lower sashes and multi-panel sashes with coloured glass. The semicircular window to King Street has anti vandalism reinforced fibreglass fitted to most of the panes and security bars to the inside. The northern window retains original glazing as well as hardware.

To King Street is a timber framed veranda, supported on six cast iron columns, with a skillion roof with corrugated steel sheeting. The columns have the name "G.Fletcher and Son, Waverley" cast into the bases. The King Street veranda was built in 1902 as an early station building addition. It appears in its original configuration. Still present are early 20th century glass sphere incandescent pendant footpath lights as well as later fluorescent fittings. Early photos show a tram lookout on this elevation which no longer exists. To the railway side (east) is a small concourse, partly sheltered by a cantilevered awning with standard double bowed steel brackets supported on decorative cement haunches. The soffit lining of this awning is corrugated steel fixed to intermediate exposed purlins. Vertical timber boards form a valance at each end of the awning and a timber fascia runs along the front. There is also a simpler corrugated steel skillion roof awning, supported on steel posts, projecting out from the entrance to the Station Manager's office adjacent to Bridge House.

The remainder of the area is covered by a flat roofed awning of ribbed steel decking supported on steel frames and circular steel posts. There is also a fire escape stair leading to the first floor of the adjacent building. The stair has a painted brick enclosure under the landing which is the toilet facilities for the shop (on the northern side of the booking office). It has aluminium framed windows and a flat steel roof. The concourse once contained the 1891 iron passenger footbridge leading to the platforms (which have now been removed) and it was replaced in 1927 by the present concrete deck on steel girders and a face brick balustrade. The edge of the concourse to the railway side is screened near the entrance with glazed aluminium framed panels and patent steel fencing (typical arched design) which extends along the edge of the concourse and out onto King Street to the south of the booking office. On the southern elevation, to the rear of the building, is an entrance directly onto the concourse. This elevation has a mass of poorly executed service runs and conduits which have an extremely negative impact on the building.

Internally, the building generally has painted brick walls laid in English bond, a concrete floor covered with a variety of contemporary finishes and painted timber boarded ceilings with stepped cornices between arched timber roof trusses (which appear to remain for the full length of the building). In the centre of each main ceiling space are original circular filigree-vented ceiling roses. Lighting generally is provided by either circular or strip tube type fluorescent fittings.

Booking hall

Formerly the parcels and ticket office, and converted in 1927 into its present configuration with widened doorways each side which are now fitted with modern heavy hinged and fixed steel grilles. The north boarded wall has been fitted with two modern security ticket windows with 19th century inspired architraves to the public side. Services and conduits are fixed to the walls. The floor is covered in tiles and a large bookstall installation with shutters on the south side. An early 20th century indicator board is placed near the doorway

Ticket office

Originally part of the main public booking hall, this space was converted in 1927 into the ticket office. Generally is a contemporary fitout. Carpets have been laid on the floor.

Staff office and kitchenette

it was originally part of the booking hall. Converted in 1927 into part of the parcels office and in recent years the staff office and kitchenette with contemporary fittings dating from c. 1990. Partitioning for new adjoining spaces and the false ceiling is formed by plasterboard sheeted timber studs. Above the staff office is a small mezzanine area for staff toilets and the housing of the computer rack. The plasterboard false ceiling to the mezzanine rooms allegedly conceals the higher original ceiling. The floor is finished with vinyl tiles. The toilet facilities have compressed fibre cement sheeting on timber framed walls and ceilings. The floor and skirtings are finished with ceramic tiles. The fittings are contemporary. The stair was built c. 1990 as a timber two-flight stair with a steel pipe handrail.

Shop to the north

This was originally part of the booking hall and converted in 1927 into the parcels office, this space was converted (pre-1990) into a shop with modern sliding aluminum framed doors for the full width to the street. The brick walled addition to the east (under the fire stair) provides toilet facilities for this shop.

=== Platform building (1927) ===
This is a rectangular (painted) face brick building, originally with a gabled roof and integral shallower sloped single cantilevered awning. The roof was replaced c. 1975 with the present ribbed steel roof which follows the low-pitched line of the platform awnings. The building is seven bays in length, with the bays defined by engaged brick piers which coincide with the awning supports. The original chimneys have been removed (presumably when the roof was replaced). The awnings have standard double bowed steel brackets supported on decorative cement haunches and bolt fixings to the station building brick walls. The soffit lining is corrugated steel fixed to intermediate exposed purlins and follows the roof slope. The building has simple bargeboards and fascias which have replaced the original vertical timber boards which formed a valance at each end of the awning. The awning roof is continuous from the main roof, and is corrugated steel.

The external walls rise from a projecting brick plinth three/four courses high with simple detailing, such as arched brick heads and brick on edge sills, to the doors and window openings. The original timber windows were double hung with a single paned lower sash and a six paned upper sash featuring coloured glass. A large number of the doors and windows have now been partially or completely bricked up, with some new windows and doors in existing, modified, openings. Most of these new windows have been painted out. Security grilles and flyscreen doors have been installed on the north elevation. Original door openings featured fanlights matching the upper window sashes. All the original timber panelled doors have been either removed or modified, and some original slate thresholds remain. The brick privacy screen to the eastern end of the building has been removed. The platform building was one of the earliest to have the face brickwork painted due to vandalism.

Internally, the original building consisted of an "out of" room, a station master's office; general waiting room; ladies room and ladies toilets, a store and men's toilets. The internal usage has now changed and is predominantly storage. The toilets have a modern fitout and finishes. All of the ceilings and cornices were replaced when the roof was rebuilt. Original plaster wall finishes remain, with evidence of dado moulding in some instances, and with some original vents. The former Station Manager's office has the original staff moulding to the chimney breast. The floor finish to the toilets is vinyl and is painted concrete in the other rooms.

=== Platforms (1927) ===
Platform 1 (Up) and Platform 2 (Down) is an island platform arrangement. The platforms are brick faced with a concrete surface. There is painted signs on the platform surface (mostly directional).

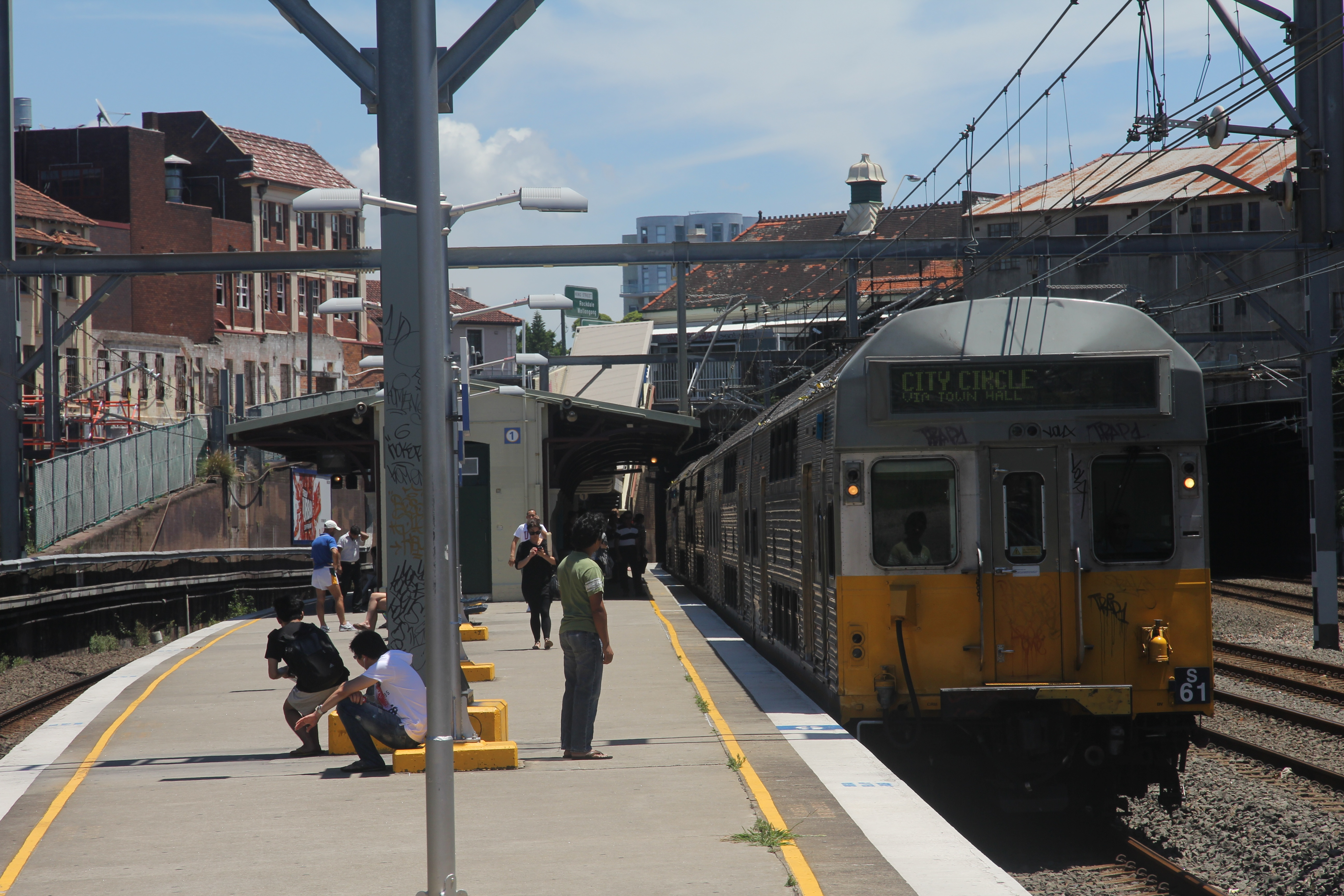
Sydney Trains S set at Newtown Station, January 2011

=== Canopies and stair (1990s) ===
Connecting the platform to the rear concourse is a steel framed stair with pre-cast concrete steps. The stair is contained within brick walls with a bull-nosed capping and has modern tubular steel handrails, which continue on to the platform.

The stair is covered by a 1990s steel framed flat roofed awning. This awning continues along the platform, to meet the platform building, and is supported by a series of steel post and beams. The roof of the canopy is designed to line up with the building's roof profile.

=== King Street Overbridge (1892/1927) ===
This large overbridge, constructed in 1892 and modified in 1927, carries in part the overhead booking office, King Street and part of the Enmore Road intersection over five railway lines. It is constructed of reinforced concrete decking supported on a combination of wrought iron and steel girders and at the western end pre-cast concrete beams. The beams and girders are supported in turn by a series of massive load bearing brick structures containing rooms now unused. These rooms would have been accessed from the previous platforms (now demolished). At street level the roads at the western end are screened by brick balustrades with sandstone cappings.

== Heritage listing ==
Newtown Railway Station is of state significance, representing three significant historical phases in the development of the NSW railways. The original Newtown Station to the west of the existing site was one of only five original intermediate stations on the first railway line in NSW between Sydney and Parramatta Junction. The subsequent two stations built on the existing station site date from the 1891 quadruplication and 1927 sextuplication of the line representing the expansion of the railways in the late 19th and early 20th Century to accommodate increasing rail services.

The station is significant in terms of its 1892 overhead booking office which is an important and recognisable element in the streetscape, and is a rare structure being one of only three similar structures in the state representing the earliest use of above-platform buildings. The building along with the King Street overbridge collectively demonstrates a former era of travel.

Newtown railway station was listed on the New South Wales State Heritage Register on 2 April 1999 having satisfied the following criteria.

The place is important in demonstrating the course, or pattern, of cultural or natural history in New South Wales.

Newtown Railway Station is historically significant as the existing station along with the former station which existed on site and the original one which occupied a site to its west, represent three significant historical phases in the development of the NSW railways. Established during the first phase of NSW railway construction in the 1850s the original Newtown Station is significant as it was one of only five original intermediate stations on the first railway line in NSW between Sydney and Parramatta. The subsequent (second) building of the station on the present station site was a result of the 1891 quadruplication of the line and the extant overhead booking office and King Street overbridge dating from this time period represent the expansion of the railways in the late 19th century to accommodate increasing rail services. The existing (third) station arrangement with its extant platforms, platform buildings and extensions to the overbridge dates from the 1927 sextuplication of the line and with the extant 1890s structures it collectively demonstrates a former era of travel, communication and trade.

The place has a strong or special association with a person, or group of persons, of importance of cultural or natural history of New South Wales's history.

Newtown Railway Station is significant for its association with railway contractor James Angus who was responsible for the design of the overhead booking office at the station. Angus set up the company Angus & Co. which played a major role in railway construction in New South Wales and Victoria notably the duplication of the Granville-Picton line in 1888–92.

The place is important in demonstrating aesthetic characteristics and/or a high degree of creative or technical achievement in New South Wales.

Newtown Railway Station has aesthetic significance with its 1890s overhead booking office which has characteristic features of this type of station building namely the use of brick for construction, the smaller size of the building and its location above the platforms on the King Street overbridge. The overhead booking office is an important and recognisable element in the streetscape. The 1920s "initial island" platform building is a typical but altered example of this type of station building, as the replacement of its original roof with a new roof with a gentler pitch has resulted in a single gable roof without the typical integrated awnings.

The place has a strong or special association with a particular community or cultural group in New South Wales for social, cultural or spiritual reasons.

The place has the potential to contribute to the local community's sense of place and can provide a connection to the local community's history.

The place possesses uncommon, rare or endangered aspects of the cultural or natural history of New South Wales.

Newtown Railway Station has rarity in terms of its 1892 overhead booking office which is one of only three known examples of similar pre1910 overhead booking offices in the state, the others being at Homebush and Redfern Railway Stations.

The place is important in demonstrating the principal characteristics of a class of cultural or natural places/environments in New South Wales.

While the platform building is representative example of a common railway standard design, the building has been altered with the replacement of its original roof with a new roof and the partial bricking in of its windows and doors, reducing its ability to represent this type of building.

The King Street overbridge with most of its original fabric intact is a good representative of deck-style plate girder bridge construction.
