= King Street, Newtown, Sydney =

Street in Sydney, Australia

King Street New South Wales
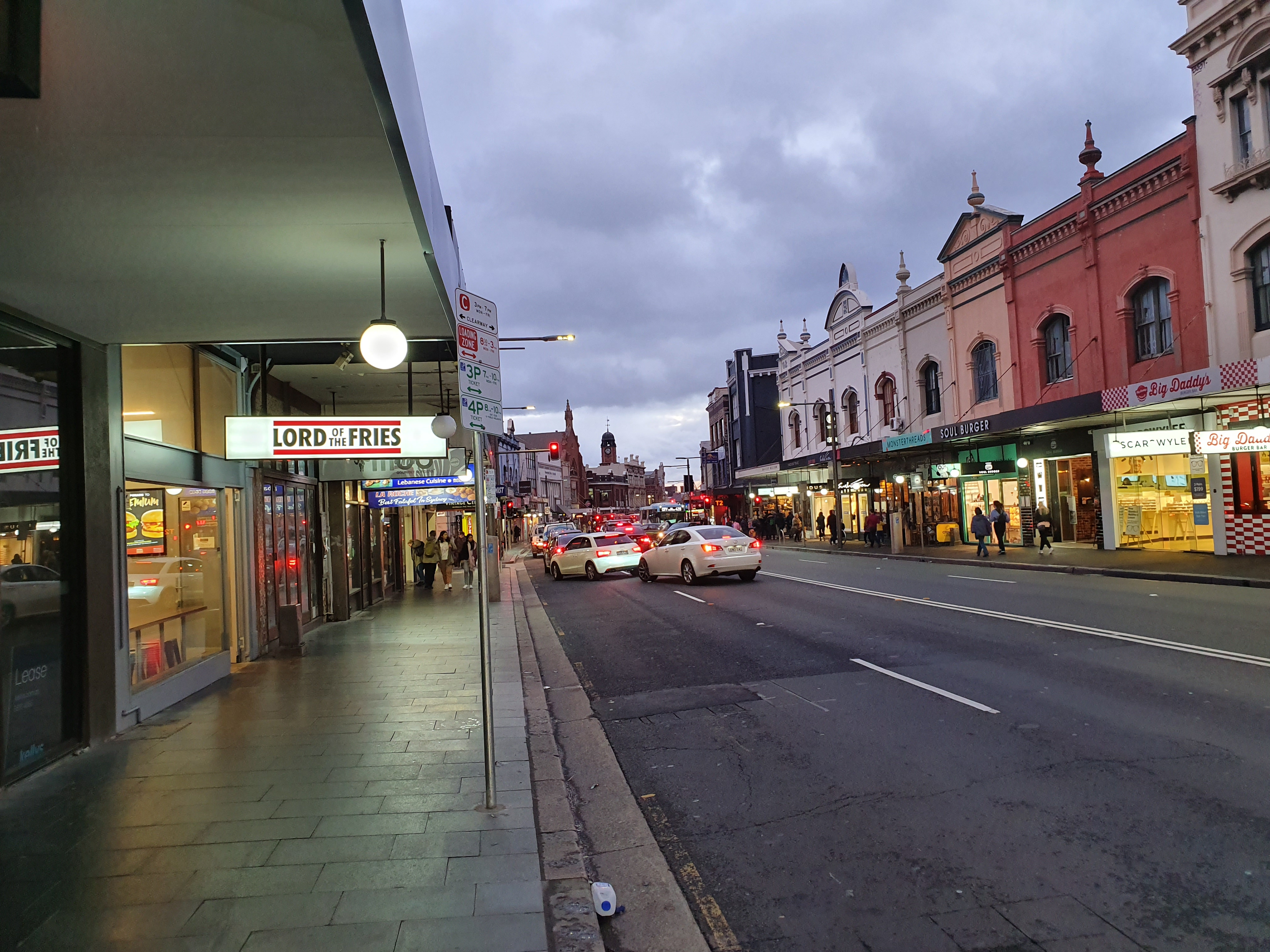
- King Street at North Newtown

General information
- Type: Road
- Length: 2.5 km (1.6 mi)
- Maintained by: Transport for NSW
- Route number(s): A36 (2013–present)
- Former route number: State Route 66 (1992–1993); National Route 1 (1955–1992); Entire route; State Route 54 (1993–2013); Enmore Street–City Road

Major junctions
- North end: City Road; Newtown, Sydney
- Enmore Road
- South end: Princes Highway; St Peters, Sydney

Location(s)
- LGA(s): City of Sydney
- Major suburbs: Newtown

Highway system
- Highways in Australia; National Highway • Freeways in Australia; Highways in New South Wales

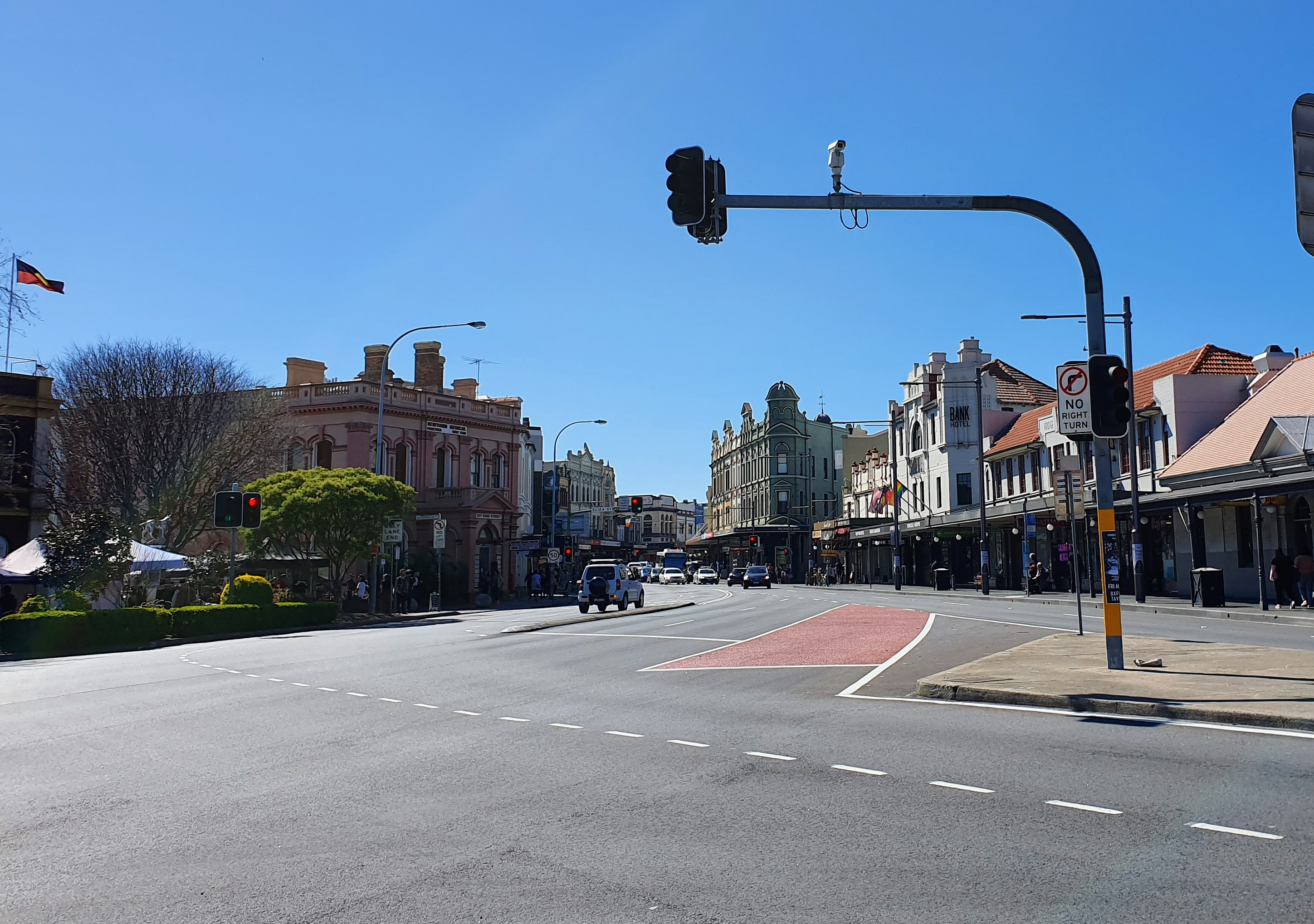
Intersection of King Street with Enmore Road

King Street is the central thoroughfare of the suburb of Newtown in Sydney, Australia. The residents of the area, including a higher-than-average concentration of students, LGBT people and artists, are most visible on this street, sealing Newtown's reputation as Sydney's premier hub of subcultures. The street can be divided geographically into two sections, North and South. King Street is particularly notable for the many picturesque Victorian era and Edwardian era commercial buildings that line the street.

King Street forms part of the Princes Highway officially and is allocated route A36.

== History ==
Like Parramatta Road, King Street is believed to follow the line of ancient Aboriginal track that led from the Sydney Cove area south-west across to Botany Bay. Prior to European settlement, the local Aboriginal population kept the Sydney area well cleared with regular low-level fires. Colonial officer Watkin Tench recorded that during the early years of the colony, the area beyond the settlement was, in effect, open parkland, and that it was possible to walk easily across country from Sydney Cove to Botany Bay.

From the late 19th century onwards, King Street developed into a thriving retail precinct. After its initial prosperity, it became run down for much of the 20th century, when Newtown was a low-income blue-collar suburb, often denigrated as a slum; at the crucial time when Victorian era buildings were being demolished elsewhere, Newtown was too unfashionable to make development profitable. By this sheer luck, King Street, as a whole, is the best-preserved Victorian era high street in Sydney, and despite gentrification since the late 20th century, development controls ensure that this will not change.

King Street was served by a busy tramway until the system's closure in 1957 (Keenan 1979). The buildings are still predominantly late Victorian, to early Federation, although there are some art deco buildings as well.

King Street was bypassed by the WestConnex underground motorway tunnel between St Peters and Rozelle. Duncan Gay claimed that after the opening of this tunnel "King Street will become the nirvana that we always hoped it would be".

== North King Street ==
North King Street, running east-north-east to west-south-west from the University of Sydney (where it joins with City Road) to Newtown railway station at the junction with Enmore Road, is a very busy thoroughfare, with heavy vehicular and pedestrian traffic the rule rather than the exception. This is the stretch that most people associate with King Street, featuring a profusion of restaurants, cafés and pubs, alongside bookshops, fashion stores and homeware retailers.

== South King Street ==
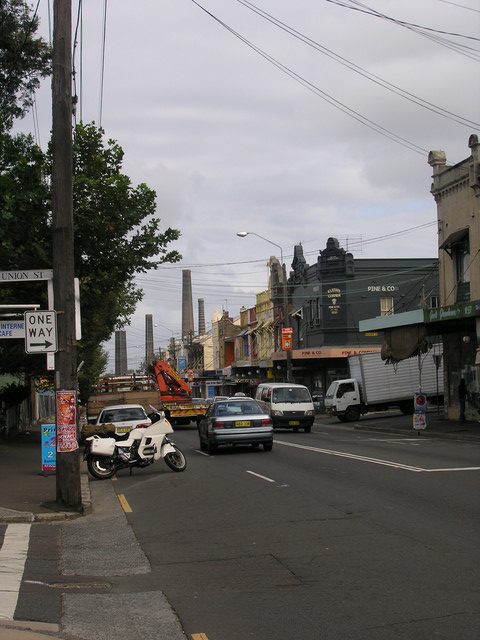
South-end of King Street, with the iconic brickworks chimneys of Sydney Park

South King Street, often known as "the Paris end", running southwards from Newtown railway station to St Peters railway station, is by contrast the down-market section, with slightly less traffic. Businesses that have been established in this stretch of King Street include cafés, antique shops and assorted small businesses. The southern end of South King Street, between Alice Street and St Peters railway station, features three theatres (New Theatre, King Street Theatre and Sydney Independent Theatre Company) and three pubs (Union Hotel, Botany View Hotel and Sydney Park Hotel).

== In popular culture ==
- Dorothy Hewett's 1959 novel Bobbin' Up includes a description of the dance halls and night life of King Street in the 1950s.
- The 1985 song "King St" by John Kennedy's Love Gone Wrong references the street and name-checks various local landmarks and characters of the time including the Coles' New World supermarket (which occupied the building which is now the Dendy Cinemas), "The Wire Man" (a local eccentric who collected wire coat hangers and scrap metal), Maurice's Lebanese restaurant (still extant) and The Hub cinema (which was operating as a pornographic cinema at the time). The music video features extensive footage of King St as it looked in 1985.
- In the mid-1980s, the Spanish Mission-style service station at 422 King Street was used as a location for scenes in the Ray Lawrence film Bliss, which was based on the novel by Peter Carey. In the film, the service station was used as the childhood home of Harry Joy's wife Bettina, played by Lynette Curran.
- The 1999 Australian film Erskineville Kings starring Marty Denniss and Hugh Jackman features King Street in its opening sequence, and includes a scene shot in the original Gould's Book Arcade on the north end of King Street.
- The 2006 Australian drama film Candy starring Heath Ledger and Abbie Cornish features Advance Loan Office on King Street, in the scene where the female lead prostitutes herself for money to fund her and her boyfriend's drug addiction.
- The Whitlams band became popular for its performances at The Sandringham Hotel on King Street. The Sandringham features in their 1999 song "God Drinks at the Sando", based on John Lowe's poem "God Drinks at the Sandringham Hotel".
- King Street is referenced in The Lemonheads' 1992 song "My Drug Buddy".
- In 2013, Sydney band Sticky Fingers filmed a music video for their song Australia Street on King Street between Church and Brown Streets.
- In June 2014, English band Coldplay filmed a music video for their song A Sky Full of Stars on King Street between Mary and Australia Streets.
