= Toongabbie railway station =

Railway station in Sydney, New South Wales, Australia

Toongabbie
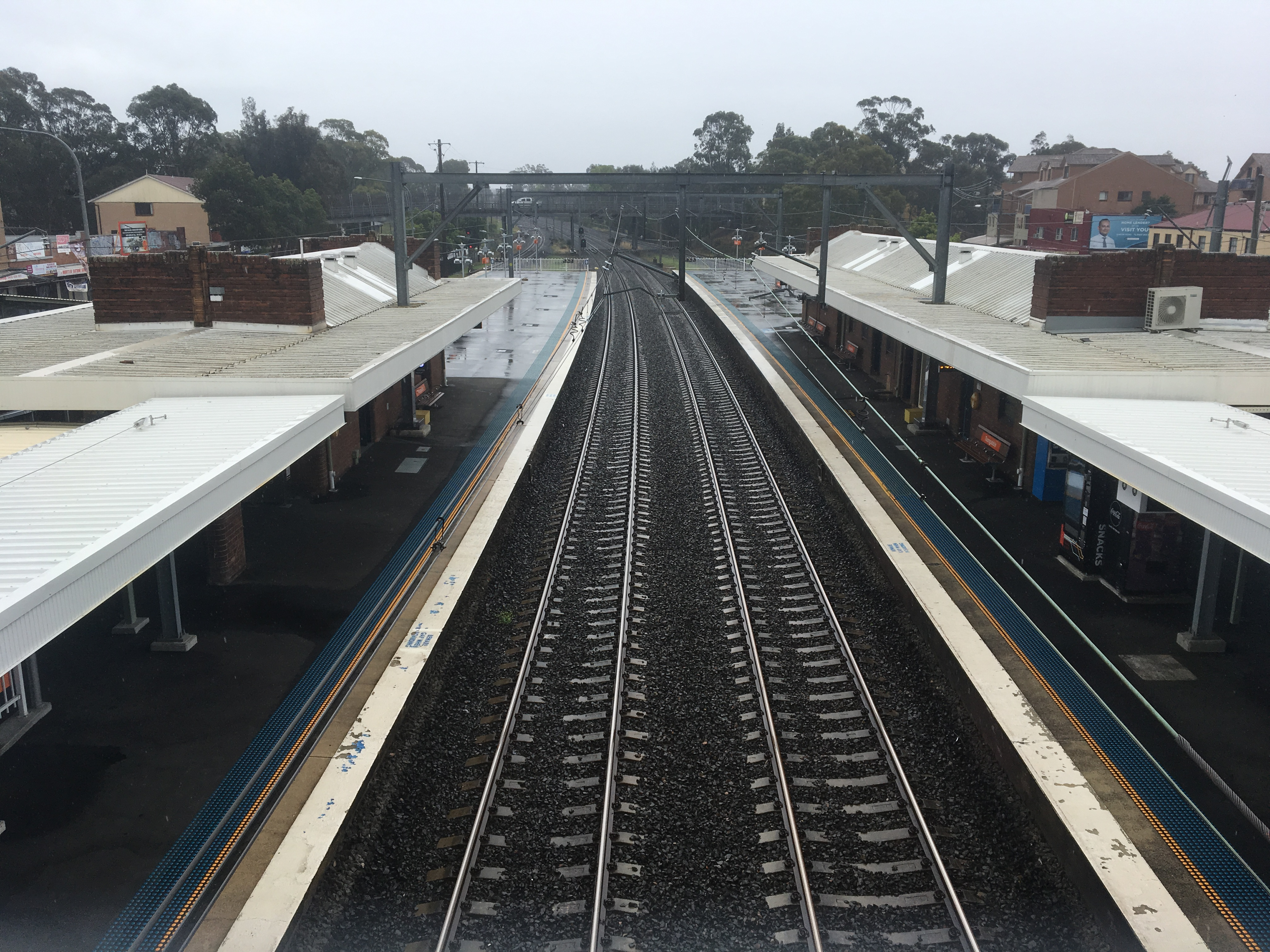
- Westbound view of the station platforms from the concourse in October 2018

General information
- Location: Wentworth Avenue, Toongabbie; Sydney, New South Wales; Australia
- Coordinates: 33°47′15″S 150°57′06″E
- Elevation: 32 metres (105 ft)
- Owner: Transport Asset Manager of NSW
- Operator: Sydney Trains
- Line: Main Western
- Distance: 29.96 km (18.62 mi) from Central
- Platforms: 4 (2 island)
- Tracks: 4
- Connections: Bus

Construction
- Structure type: Ground
- Accessible: Yes

Other information
- Status: Weekdays: Staffed: 6am to 7pm: Weekends and public holidays: Staffed: 8am to 4pm
- Station code: TBB
- Website: Transport for NSW

History
- Opened: 26 April 1880 (146 years ago)
- Rebuilt: 1940s (c.80 years ago)
- Electrified: Yes (from February 1955)

Passengers
- 2025: 1,477,538 (year); 4,048 (daily) (Sydney Trains)
- Rank: 97

Services
Preceding station	Sydney Trains	Following station
Seven Hills towards Emu Plains or Richmond	North Shore & Western Line	Pendle Hill towards Berowra
Seven Hills towards Richmond	Cumberland Line	Pendle Hill towards Leppington
Location

Toongabbie railway station is a suburban railway station located on the Main Western line, serving the Sydney suburb of Toongabbie. It is served by Sydney Trains T1 Western Line and T5 Cumberland Line services.

== History ==
Toongabbie station opened on 26 April 1880. The station was a small, unattended conditional stopping place. The first platform was on the northern side of the track. When the line was duplicated in March 1886, an additional platform was added on the south side of the tracks. A disc on the end of a five-foot pole was held up by intending passengers to stop the train.

The “Toongabbee” station is listed on the 2nd subdivision of the Darcyville estate in 1886, part of the estate of the late D'Arcy Wentworth, which stretched from Toongabbie to Westmead.

The station was rebuilt in the 1940s when the Main Western line was quadrupled. In 2018, work was completed on an accessibility upgrade which like its neighbouring stations Pendle Hill and Wentworthville included a new concourse, footbridge and lifts as part of the Station Accessibility Upgrade Program.

== Services ==
=== Platforms ===
Platform	Line	Stopping pattern	Notes
1	North Shore & Western Line	services to North Sydney, Hornsby & Berowra via Central	
1	Cumberland Line	services to Liverpool & Leppington	
2	North Shore & Western Line	services to North Sydney, Lindfield, Hornsby & Berowra	infrequently used
2	Cumberland Line	services to Leppington	infrequently used
3	North Shore & Western Line	services to Blacktown & Richmond late night services to Penrith	infrequently used
3	Cumberland Line	services to Schofields	infrequently used
4	North Shore & Western Line	services to Blacktown, Schofields & Richmond early morning & late night services to Penrith; 2 weekday early morning services to Emu Plains	
4	Cumberland Line	services to Blacktown, Schofields & Richmond	

=== Transport links ===
CDC NSW operates two bus routes via Toongabbie station, under contract to Transport for NSW:

- 705: Parramatta station to Blacktown station via Pendle Hill, Seven Hills & Lalor Park
- 711: Parramatta station to Blacktown station via Westmead Hospital, Seven Hills & Lalor Park

Toongabbie station is served by two NightRide routes:

- N70: Penrith to Town Hall station
- N71: Richmond to Town Hall station
