= Pendle Hill High School =

Australian co-ed high school

Coordinates: 33°47′S 150°58′E

Location
- Cornock Avenue; Pendle Hill, New South Wales; Australia

Information
- Type: High School
- Established: 1965
- Principal: Judy Sims
- Grades: 7–12
- Enrolment: 450
- Campus: Urban

Pendle Hill High School is a comprehensive, co-educational high school with around 692 students located in Pendle Hill, a suburb in the west of Sydney, Australia. It was created in 1965, 10 years after the opening of Pendle Hill Public School.

== School profile ==
The school is set in a residential area that is slowly undergoing renewal with increasing medium-density development, particularly around Pendle Hill station and Wentworthville railway station. The school is located around 3 km away from Pendle Hill station and around 2 km from Wentworthville station.

There is increasing student cultural diversity with 5% of students identifying as Aboriginal or Torress Strait Islander and 72% of students coming from non-English speaking backgrounds.

== Notable alumni ==
- Maureen Caird – athlete; competed in the Mexico Olympics Women's 80m Hurdles
- Julian Cheung – Hong Kong actor
- Bradley Hore – boxer; two Olympic and Commonwealth Games Representative Boxing
- Neil Hunt – rugby league footballer
- Fiona Johnson – hockey player; played with the Hockeyroos
- John Larkin – author
- Scott Mahon – rugby league footballer
- Bradley McGee – cyclist
- Joan Ross – artist; winner of the 2017 Sir John Sulman Prize

== See also ==
- List of government schools in New South Wales: G–P
