= Pendle Hill railway station =

Railway station in Sydney, New South Wales, Australia

Pendle Hill
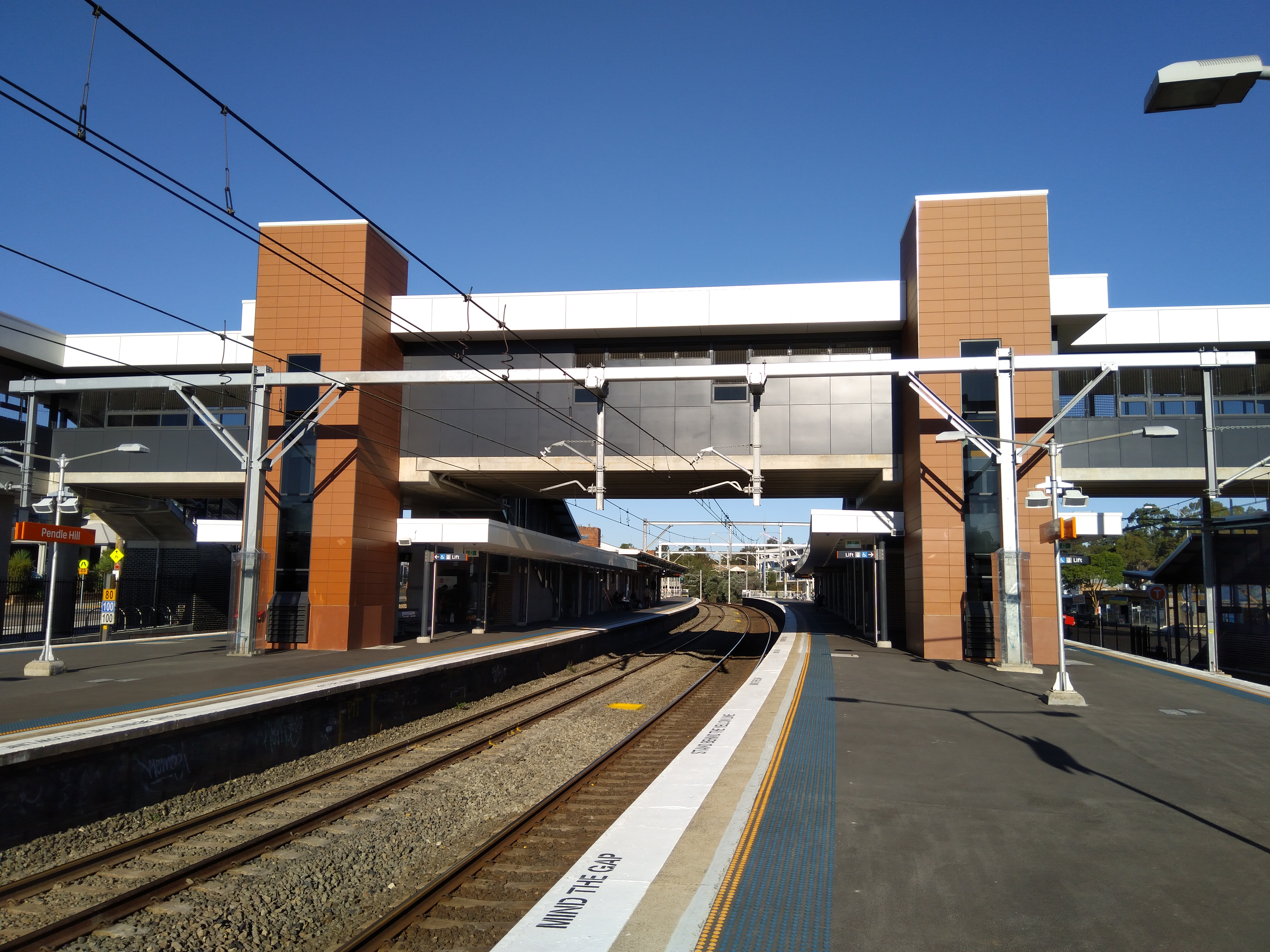
- Eastbound view of station platform and concourse in May 2018

General information
- Location: Wentworth Avenue, Pendle Hill; Sydney, New South Wales; Australia
- Coordinates: 33°48′06″S 150°57′23″E
- Elevation: 46 metres (151 ft)
- Owner: Transport Asset Manager of NSW
- Operator: Sydney Trains
- Line: Main Western
- Distance: 28.29 km (17.58 mi) from Central
- Platforms: 4 (2 island)
- Tracks: 4
- Connections: Bus

Construction
- Structure type: Ground
- Accessible: Yes

Other information
- Status: Weekdays: Staffed: 6am to 7pm: Weekends and public holidays: Staffed: 8am to 4pm
- Station code: PDH
- Website: Transport for NSW

History
- Opened: 12 April 1924 (102 years ago)
- Rebuilt: 1940s (c.80 years ago)
- Electrified: Yes (from February 1955)

Passengers
- 2025: 1,608,023 (year); 4,406 (daily) (Sydney Trains)
- Rank: 88

Services
Preceding station	Sydney Trains	Following station
Toongabbie towards Emu Plains or Richmond	North Shore & Western Line	Wentworthville towards Berowra
Toongabbie towards Richmond	Cumberland Line	Wentworthville towards Leppington
Location

Pendle Hill railway station is a suburban railway station located on the Main Western line, serving the Sydney suburb of Pendle Hill. It is served by Sydney Trains T1 Western Line and T5 Cumberland Line services.

== History ==
Pendle Hill station opened on 12 April 1924. The station was rebuilt in the 1940s when the Main Western line was quadrupled.

In August 2017, work was completed on an upgrade to the station. Like the neighbouring stations at Wentworthville and Toongabbie. The upgrade included a new footbridge, concourse and lifts as part of the Station Accessibility Upgrade Program.

== Services ==
=== Platforms ===
Platform	Line	Stopping pattern	Notes
1	North Shore & Western Line	services to North Sydney, Hornsby & Berowra via Central	
1	Cumberland Line	services to services to Liverpool & Leppington	
2	North Shore & Western Line	services to North Sydney, Lindfield, Hornsby & Berowra	infrequently used
2	Cumberland Line	services to Leppington	infrequently used
3	North Shore & Western Line	services to Blacktown & Richmond late night services to Penrith	infrequently used
3	Cumberland Line	services to Schofields	infrequently used
4	North Shore & Western Line	services to Blacktown, Schofields & Richmond early morning & late night services to Penrith; 2 weekday early morning services to Emu Plains	
4	Cumberland Line	services to Blacktown, Schofields & Richmond	
