= Doonside railway station =

Railway station in Sydney, New South Wales, Australia

Doonside
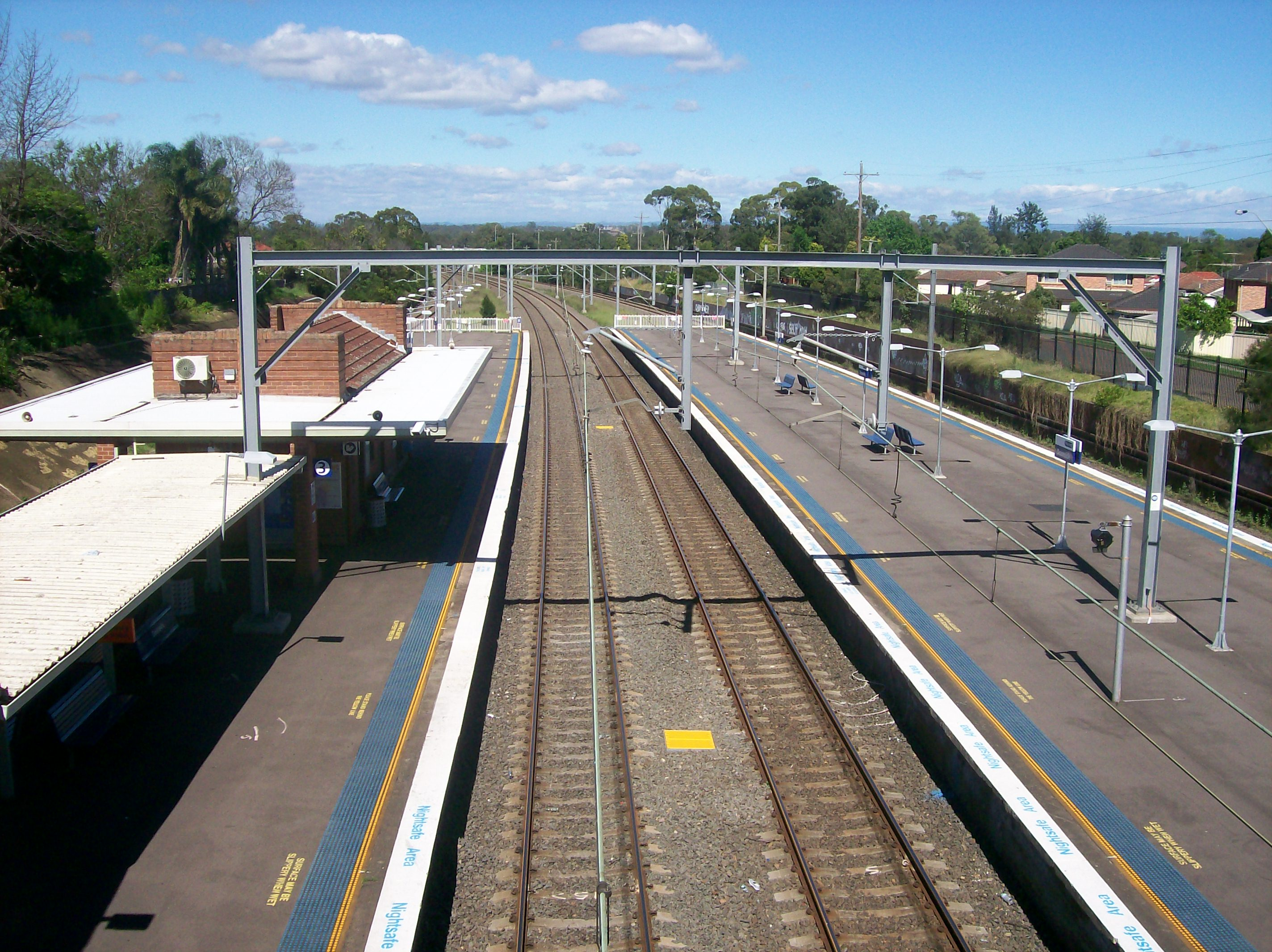
- Westbound view of platforms in November 2011

General information
- Location: Doonside Crescent, Doonside; Sydney, New South Wales; Australia
- Coordinates: 33°45′49″S 150°52′09″E
- Owner: Transport Asset Manager of NSW
- Operator: Sydney Trains
- Line: Main Western
- Distance: 38.59 km (23.98 mi) from Central
- Platforms: 4 (2 island)
- Tracks: 4
- Connections: Bus

Construction
- Structure type: Ground
- Accessible: Yes

Other information
- Status: Weekdays: Staffed: 6am to 7pm: Weekends and public holidays: Staffed: 8am to 4pm
- Station code: DOD
- Website: Transport for NSW

History
- Opened: 27 September 1880 (145 years ago)
- Electrified: Yes (from October 1955)
- Former names: Wolkara (1921)

Passengers
- 2025: 1,391,532 (year); 3,812 (daily) (Sydney Trains)
- Rank: 104

Services
Preceding station	Sydney Trains	Following station
Rooty Hill towards Emu Plains	North Shore & Western Line	Blacktown towards Berowra
Location

Doonside railway station is a suburban railway station located on the Main Western line, serving the Sydney suburb of Doonside. It is served by Sydney Trains T1 Western line services.

== History ==
Doonside station opened on 27 September 1880.

It was renamed Wolkara on 1 February 1921, before resuming its original name 12 days later. The station was rebuilt in the 1950s when the Main Western line was electrified.

On 2 December 2023, an upgrade to the station was complete which included the addition of lifts, upgraded canopies and the relocation of the stairs on Platforms 3 and 4 to the eastern end of the platforms, in order to match Platforms 1 and 2.

== Services ==
=== Platforms ===
Platform	Line	Stopping pattern	Notes
1	T1	services to North Sydney, Gordon, Hornsby & Berowra via Central & Chatswood	
2	T1	services to Gordon, Hornsby & Berowra via Central & Chatswood	Mainly used during peak hours
3	T1	services to Penrith & Emu Plains	Mainly used during peak hours
4	T1	services to Penrith & Emu Plains	

=== Transport links ===
Busways operates two bus routes via Doonside station, under contract to Transport for NSW:

- 726: to Blacktown station
- 753: to Blacktown station via Quakers Hill

Doonside station is served by one NightRide route:

- N70: Penrith station to Town Hall station.
