= Wentworthville railway station =

Railway station in Sydney, Australia

Wentworthville
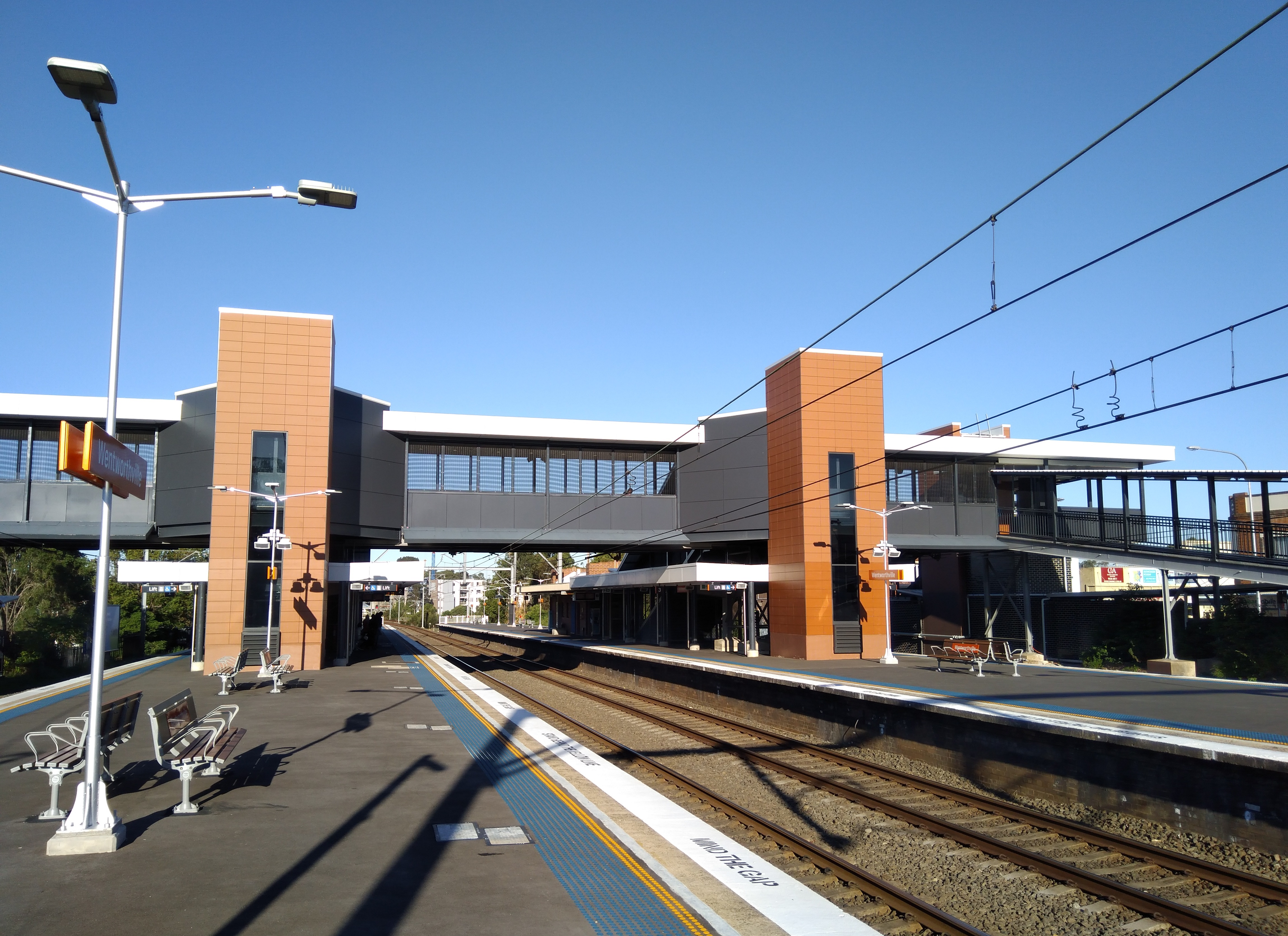
- Eastbound view of station platforms and concourse in May 2018

General information
- Location: The Kingsway, Wentworthville; Sydney, New South Wales; Australia
- Coordinates: 33°48′26″S 150°58′21″E
- Elevation: 28 metres (92 ft)
- Owner: Transport Asset Manager of NSW
- Operator: Sydney Trains
- Line: Main Western
- Distance: 26.64 km (16.55 mi) from Central
- Platforms: 4 (2 island)
- Tracks: 4
- Connections: Bus

Construction
- Structure type: Ground
- Accessible: Yes

Other information
- Status: Weekdays: Staffed: 6am to 7pm: Weekends and public holidays: Staffed: 8am to 4pm
- Station code: WWH
- Website: Transport for NSW

History
- Opened: 1883 (143 years ago)
- Rebuilt: 1940s (c.80 years ago)
- Electrified: Yes (from February 1955)
- Former names: T R Smith's Platform (1883–1885)

Passengers
- 2023: 1,920,060 (year); 5,260 (daily) (Sydney Trains, NSW TrainLink)

Services
Preceding station	Sydney Trains	Following station
Pendle Hill towards Emu Plains or Richmond	North Shore & Western Line	Westmead towards Berowra
Pendle Hill towards Richmond	Cumberland Line	Westmead towards Leppington
Location

Wentworthville railway station is a suburban railway station located on the Main Western line, serving the Sydney suburb of Wentworthville. It is served by Sydney Trains T1 Western Line and T5 Cumberland Line services.

== History ==
Wentworthville station opened in 1883 as T R Smith's Platform, being renamed Wentworthville on 1 August 1885. The station was rebuilt in the 1940s when the Main Western line was quadrupled.

In 2015, work commenced on an upgrade to the station. Like the neighboring stations at Pendle Hill and Toongabbie. The upgrade included a new footbridge, concourse and lifts as part of the Station Accessibility Upgrade Program and was completed in 2018.

== Services ==
=== Platforms ===
Platform	Line	Stopping pattern	Notes
1	North Shore & Western Line	services to North Sydney, Hornsby & Berowra via Central	
1	Cumberland Line	services to Liverpool & Leppington	
2	North Shore & Western Line	services to North Sydney, Lindfield, Hornsby & Berowra	infrequently used
2	Cumberland Line	services to Leppington	infrequently used
3	North Shore & Western Line	services to Blacktown & Richmond late night services to Penrith	infrequently used
3	Cumberland Line	services to Schofields	infrequently used
4	North Shore & Western Line	services to Blacktown, Schofields & Richmond early morning & late night services to Penrith; 2 weekday early morning services to Emu Plains	
4	Cumberland Line	services to Blacktown, Schofields & Richmond	

=== Transport links ===
CDC NSW operates four bus routes via Wentworthville station, under contract to Transport for NSW:

- 705: Parramatta station to Blacktown station via Pendle Hill, Seven Hills & Lalor Park
- 708: Parramatta station to Constitution Hill via Pendle Hill
- 709: to Constitution Hill
- 711: Parramatta station to Blacktown station via Westmead Hospital, Seven Hills & Lalor Park

Transit Systems operates one bus route via Wentworthville station, under contract to Transport for NSW:

- 818: Merrylands station to Westmead Hospital

Wentworthville station is served by two NightRide routes:

- N70: Penrith station to Town Hall station
- N71: Richmond station to Town Hall station
