= Seven Hills railway station =

Railway station in Sydney, New South Wales, Australia

Seven Hills
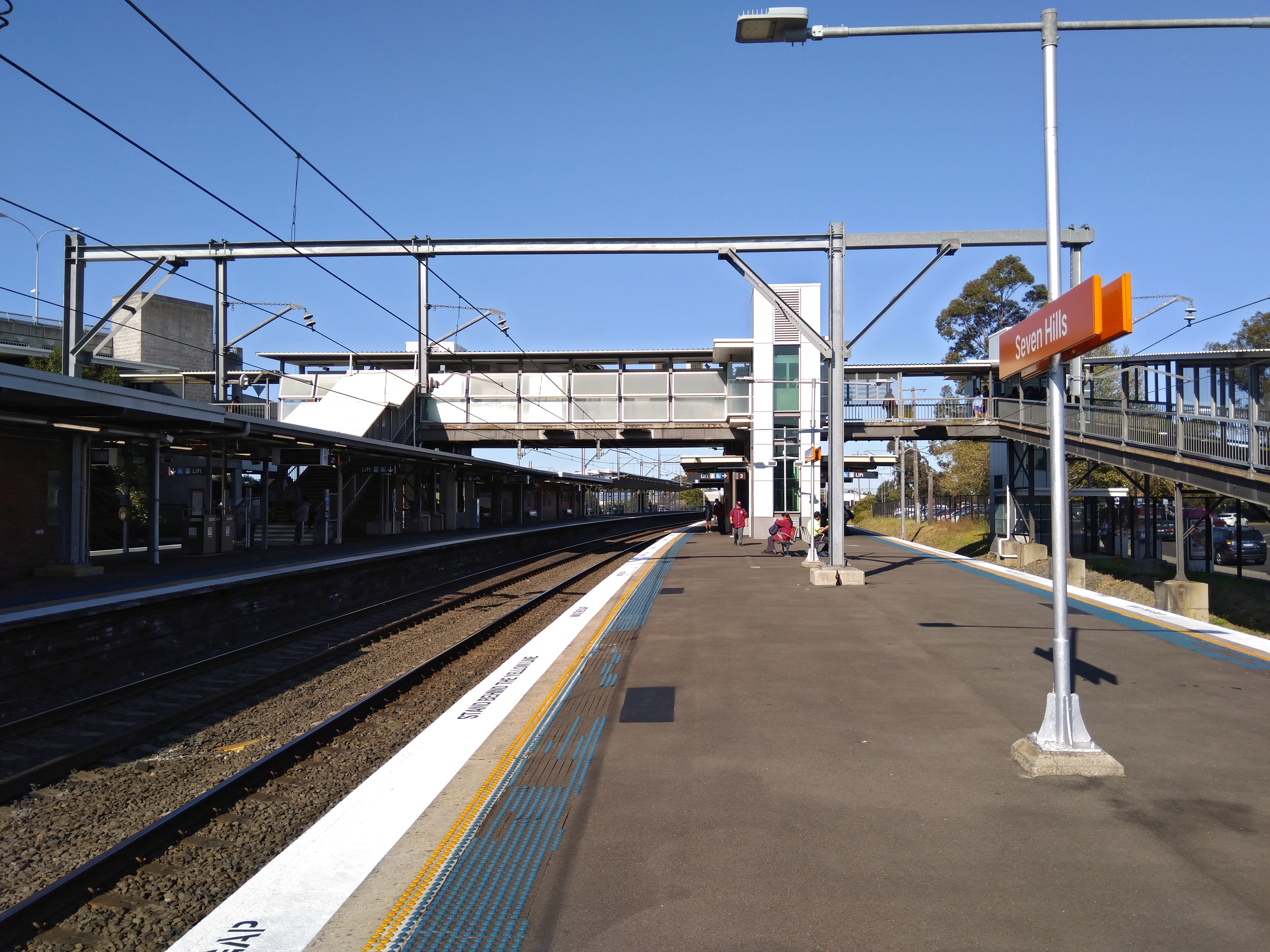
- Eastbound view from Platform 3 looking towards the station concourse in September 2017

General information
- Location: Terminus Road, Seven Hills; Sydney, New South Wales; Australia
- Coordinates: 33°46′28″S 150°56′12″E
- Elevation: 40 metres (130 ft)
- Owner: Transport Asset Manager of NSW
- Operator: Sydney Trains
- Line: Main Western
- Distance: 32.06 km (19.92 mi) from Central
- Platforms: 4 (2 island)
- Tracks: 4
- Connections: Bus

Construction
- Structure type: Ground
- Parking: 1315 spaces
- Accessible: Yes

Other information
- Status: Staffed
- Station code: SEV
- Website: Transport for NSW

History
- Opened: 1 December 1863 (162 years ago)
- Rebuilt: 1940s (c.80 years ago)
- Electrified: Yes (from February 1955)

Passengers
- 2025: 3,015,759 (year); 8,262 (daily) (Sydney Trains)
- Rank: 57

Services
Preceding station	Sydney Trains	Following station
Blacktown towards Emu Plains or Richmond	North Shore & Western Line	Toongabbie towards Berowra
Blacktown towards Penrith or Emu Plains	North Shore & Western Line	Westmead towards Berowra
Blacktown towards Penrith or Emu Plains	North Shore & Western Line Weekday peak only	Parramatta towards Berowra
Blacktown towards Richmond	Cumberland Line	Toongabbie towards Leppington
Location

Seven Hills railway station is a suburban railway station located on the Main Western line, serving the Sydney suburb of Seven Hills. It is served by Sydney Trains T1 Western Line and T5 Cumberland Line services.

== History ==
Seven Hills station opened on 1 December 1863. The station was rebuilt in the 1940s when the Main Western line was quadrupled.

The station was upgraded in 2007, and received lifts and canopy extensions.

Immediately west of the station, the Richmond line branches off via a 1955-built pre-stressed concrete girder bridge.

== Services ==
=== Platforms ===
Platform	Line	Stopping pattern	Notes
1	North Shore & Western Line	services to North Sydney, Hornsby & Berowra via Central	
1	Cumberland Line	services to Liverpool & Leppington	
2	North Shore & Western Line	services to North Sydney, Lindfield, Hornsby & Berowra via Central	
2	Cumberland Line	services to Leppington	infrequently used
3	North Shore & Western Line	services to Blacktown, Penrith, Richmond & Emu Plains	
3	Cumberland Line	services to Schofields	infrequently used
4	North Shore & Western Line	services to Penrith, Richmond, Schofields & Emu Plains	
4	Cumberland Line	services to Blacktown, Schofields and Richmond	

=== Transport links ===
Busways operates one bus route via Seven Hills station, under contract to Transport for NSW:

- 718: to Kings Langley

CDC NSW operates seven bus routes via Seven Hills station, under contract to Transport for NSW:

- 611: Blacktown station to Macquarie Park
- 630: Blacktown station to Epping station
- 702: to Blacktown station
- 705: Blacktown station to Parramatta station
- 711: Blacktown station to Parramatta station
- 714: to Bella Vista
- 715: to Rouse Hill

Seven Hills station is served by two NightRide routes:

- N70: Penrith station to Town Hall station
- N71: Richmond station to Town Hall station

== Trackplan ==
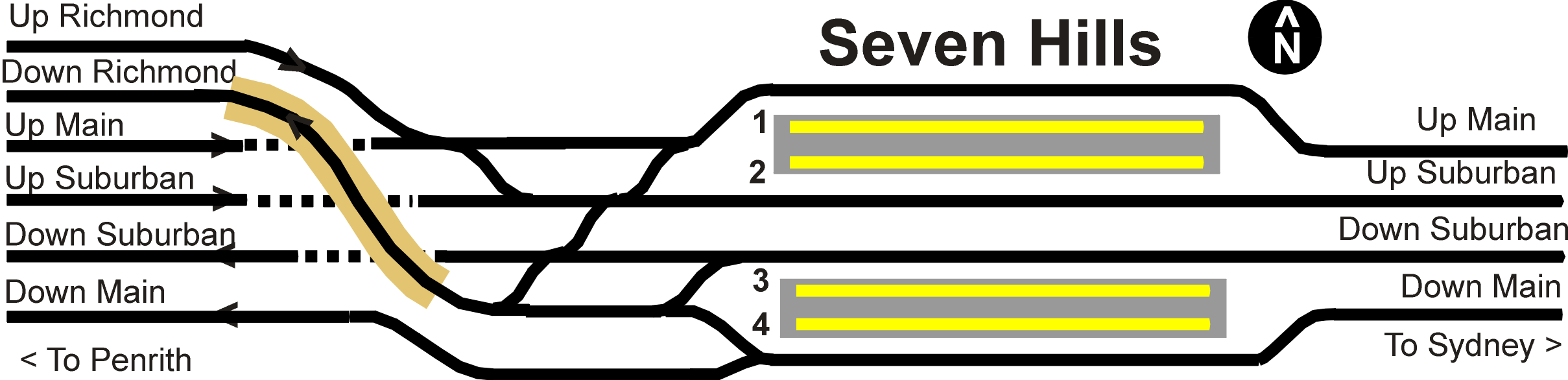
Track layout at Seven Hills
