= Neil Hunt =

Australian rugby league footballer

Personal information
- Full name: Neil Hunt
- Born: 21 November 1960 (age 64)
- Height: 185 cm (6 ft 1 in)
- Weight: 83 kg (13 st 1 lb)

Playing information
- Position: Wing, Fullback
Club
Years	Team	Pld	T	G	FG	P
1980–87	Parramatta Eels	100	46	17	0	203
1988–89	Gold Coast	23	5	0	0	20
1984–85	Leeds	31	11	0	0	44
	Total	154	62	17	0	267
Representative
Years	Team	Pld	T	G	FG	P
1983	New South Wales	2	1	0	0	4
- Source: As of 1 February 2019
- Education: Pendle Hill High School
- Father: Jim Hunt
- Relatives: Justin Hunt (son)

Neil Hunt (born 21 November 1960) is a former professional rugby league footballer who played in the New South Wales Rugby League (NSWRL) competition for Parramatta with whom he won the 1982 premiership and the Gold Coast. He primarily played on the wing.

== Background ==
While attending Pendle Hill High School, Hunt played for the Australian Schoolboys team in 1978 and 1979.

== Playing career ==
Hunt made his first grade debut for Parramatta in Round 19 1979 against North Sydney playing from the bench in a 41–3 victory.

In 1982, Hunt played on the wing for Parramatta in the 1982 NSWRL grand final victory over Manly-Warringah which was the club's 2nd consecutive premiership win.

Hunt was selected to represent New South Wales on the wing for games II and III of the 1983 State of Origin series, scoring a try in New South Wales' 10–6 win over Queensland.

Hunt missed out on playing in the 1983 NSWRL grand final victory against the same opponents but returned in 1984 and played in the 1984 NSWRL grand final defeat against arch rivals Canterbury-Bankstown. In the 1984/85 off-season in Australia, Hunt travelled to England and played for Leeds. Hunt played on with Parramatta until the end of the 1987 but was not included in the 1986 premiership winning side. In 1988, Hunt joined the Gold Coast and played in the club's first season and finished his career the following year in 1989.
