= T1 North Shore & Western Line =

Rail service in Sydney, New South Wales, Australia

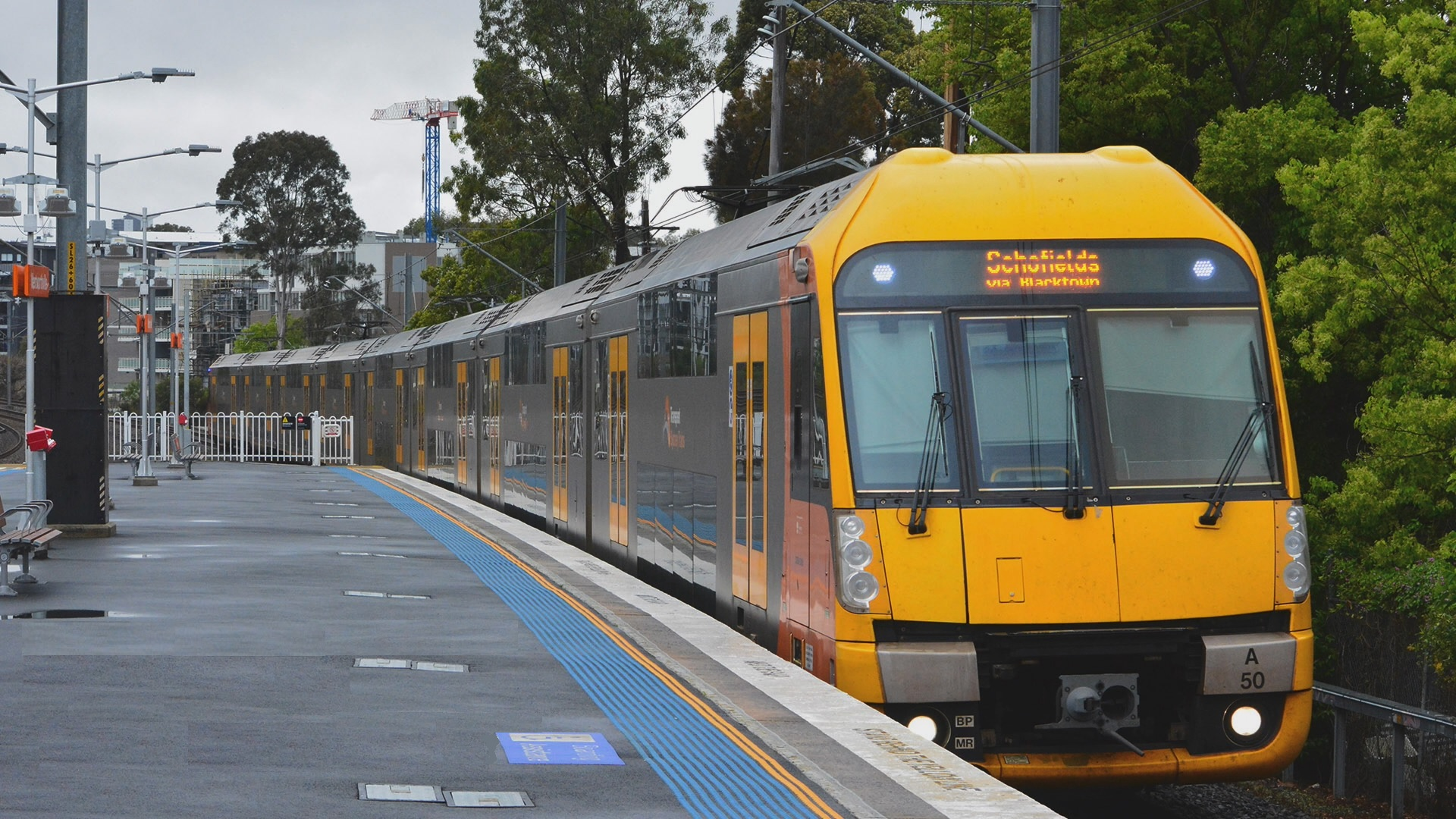
- An A set at Wentworthville

Overview
- Service type: Commuter rail service
- Status: Active
- Locale: Sydney
- Predecessor: North Shore, Northern & Western (2013–2019)
- Current operator: Sydney Trains
- Annual ridership: 142,853,000 (2017–18)

Route
- Termini: Berowra; Emu Plains; Richmond
- Stops: 56
- Average journey time: 1 hour 58 minutes (Berowra to Blacktown); 29 minutes (Blacktown to Emu Plains); 34 minutes (Blacktown to Richmond) (journey times vary based on stopping pattern and time)
- Lines used: Main North; Main Suburban; Main Western; North Shore; Richmond

Technical
- Rolling stock: T, H, A and B sets
- Track gauge: 1,435 mm (4 ft 8 1/2 in) standard gauge
- Timetable number: T1
Sydney rail network
Sydney Trains suburban services
T1 North Shore & Western
T2 Leppington & Inner West
T3 Liverpool & Inner West
T4 Eastern Suburbs & Illawarra
T5 Cumberland
T6 Lidcombe & Bankstown
T7 Olympic Park
T8 Airport & South
T9 Northern
Sydney Metro
M1 Metro North West & Bankstown

The T1 North Shore & Western Line is a suburban rail service operated by Sydney Trains, serving the North Shore, parts of the Inner West and Western Suburbs of Sydney. The line is approximately 128 kilometers long, making it the longest Sydney Trains service. The North Shore and Western Line runs from Berowra in the north of Sydney to the western suburbs of Emu Plains and Richmond.

The line was originally formed in 2013 an amalgamation of the North Shore Line, Western Line and Northern Line, before the line was split into the Northern Line and the North Shore & Western Line in 2019.

Since 2013, the line has been numbered T1 and is coloured yellow on maps and wayfinding information.

== History ==
Following victory in the 2011 New South Wales election, the O'Farrell Government embarked on reform of transport in New South Wales. In November 2011, Transport for NSW was created to improve planning and coordination of transport projects and services. The organisation developed a new rail timetable and branding, which was put into effect on 20 October 2013. This saw the merger of the North Shore Line and Western Line with the Northern Line to form the North Shore, Northern & Western Line. A new numbering system was also introduced and the line was given the number T1. The North Shore, Northern & Western Line ran along the Epping to Chatswood line until it closed in September 2018 to be converted to metro standards as part of the Sydney Metro Northwest project. As a result, the traditional Northern line route from Hornsby to Central via Strathfield was reinstated. The closed section was replaced by Station Link bus services until it reopened as metro. On 28 April 2019, this route became a separate T9 Northern Line, with the T1 renamed the North Shore & Western Line.

=== Railway line history ===
The T1 uses a number of different railway lines and is the result of various schemes to link the lines together. The line is centred around the Main Suburban railway line which runs from Central to Granville, which continues as the Main Western line at Granville. The Richmond railway line branches from the Main Western line at Blacktown.

In the other direction from Central towards the North Shore, the T1 uses the North Shore Line towards Hornsby, then continues along the Main North Line towards Berowra.

==== Main Western and Richmond railway lines ====
The Main Western railway line opened to Penrith in 1863 as a branch from the junction with the Main South line at Granville. Electrification reached Parramatta in 1928 and Penrith in 1955.

A branch line was opened to Richmond in 1864 under the stewardship of engineer James Moore. Electrification from Riverstone to Richmond opened in August 1991. Through running to and from Sydney commenced in 1992.

==== North Shore railway line ====
The North Shore railway line was opened on 1 January 1890 between Hornsby and St Leonards. The line was extended to the Sydney Harbour foreshore at Milsons Point in 1893. Transport between this original Milsons Point station and central Sydney was by ferry boat. The line was electrified in 1927.

When the Sydney Harbour Bridge was opened in 1932 a new Milsons Point station (on the bridge approach) came into operation and the North Shore Line was extended through it and over the Sydney Harbour Bridge to link with the underground lines of central Sydney. The result is that the two ends of the North Shore Line link to the Sydney railway system at Central and Hornsby.

==== Main North railway line ====
The T1 uses the section of the Main North railway line between Hornsby and Berowra, which was opened in 1887 and electrified in 1959.

== Services ==
On the North Shore railway line, trains run every 3 to 4 minutes during weekday peak hours, and 5 to 10 minutes per train towards Emu Plains and Richmond. During the off-peak and weekends, trains generally run every 10 to 15 minutes.

Between Berowra and Central, trains run as all-stops trains. On the Main Suburban line, trains usually run as express services, skipping intermediate stations between Lidcombe and Parramatta. During peak hours, T1 trains may also skip Lidcombe during peak hours only. Beyond Parramatta, Richmond-bound services stop at all stations to Richmond, while Emu Plains-bound services skip stations between Westmead and Seven Hills, and then stop at all stations towards Emu Plains.

On weekends, trains run between Penrith, Richmond and the City. Penrith trains run a similar stopping pattern, but stop at all stations between Parramatta and Lidcombe. These trains make shorter workings to Lindfield or North Sydney.

== Rolling stock ==
- New South Wales A and B sets 8-car EMUs
- New South Wales T set 8-car EMUs
- New South Wales H set 8-car EMUs – Weekdays only
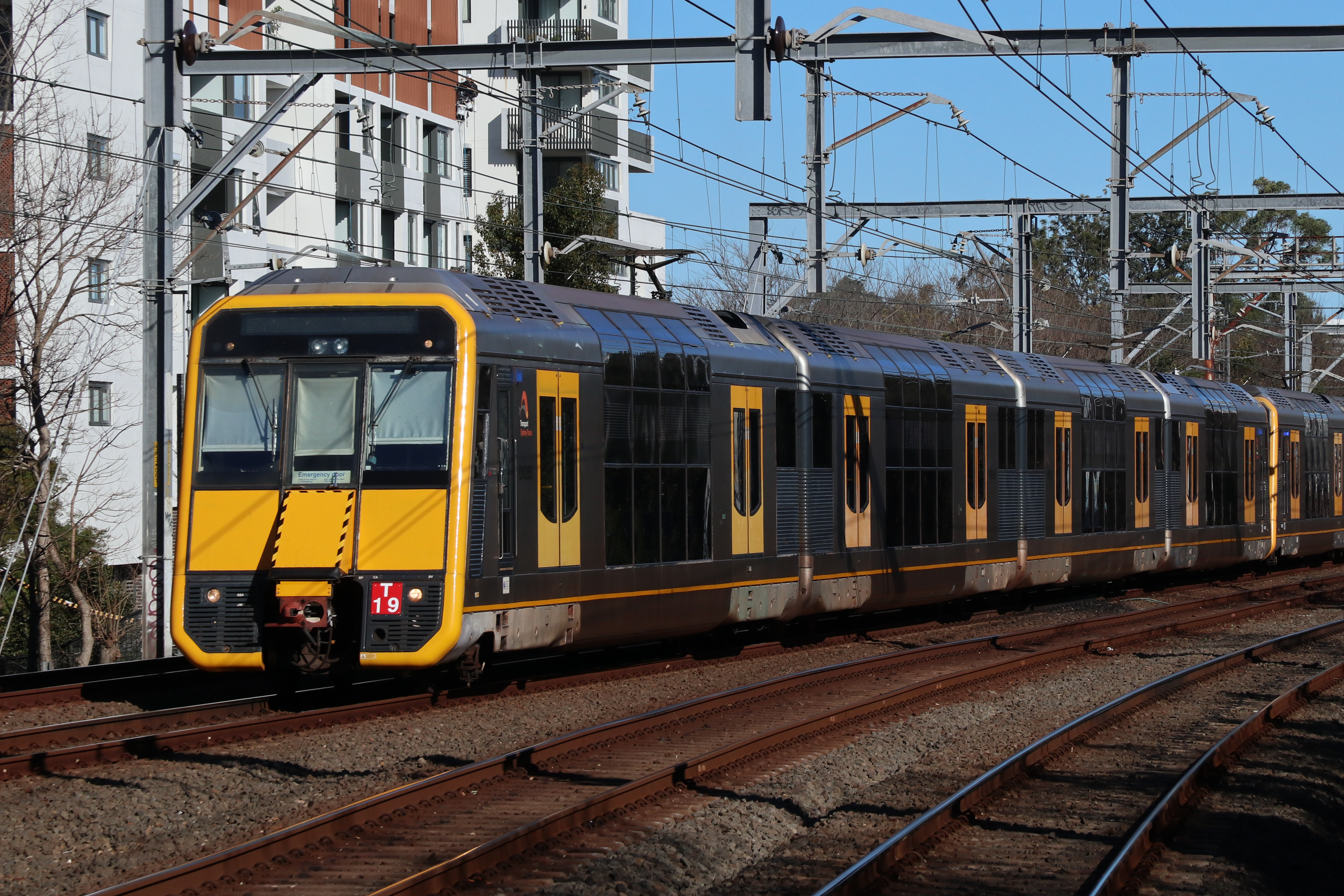
Tangara T set

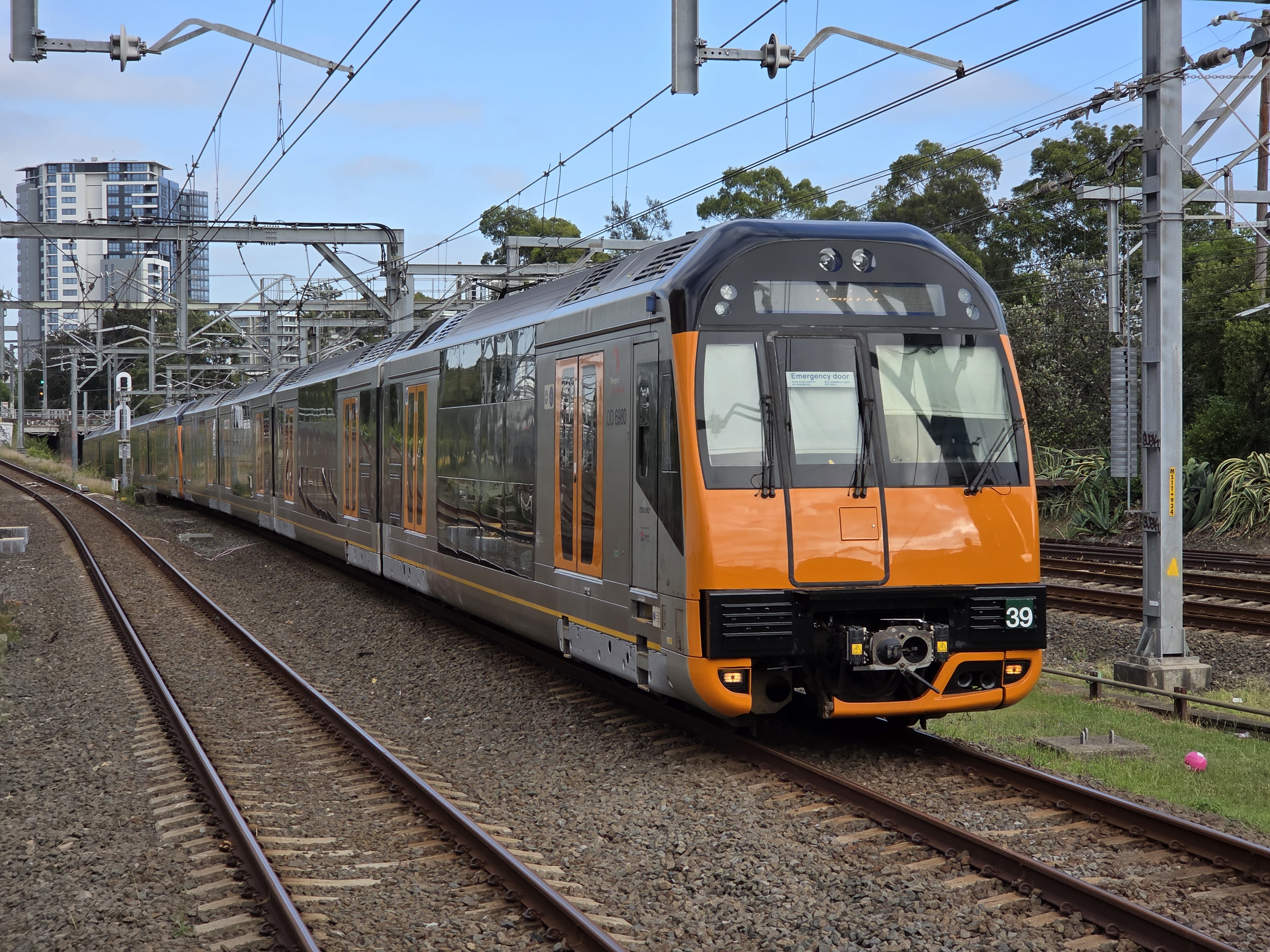
Oscar H set

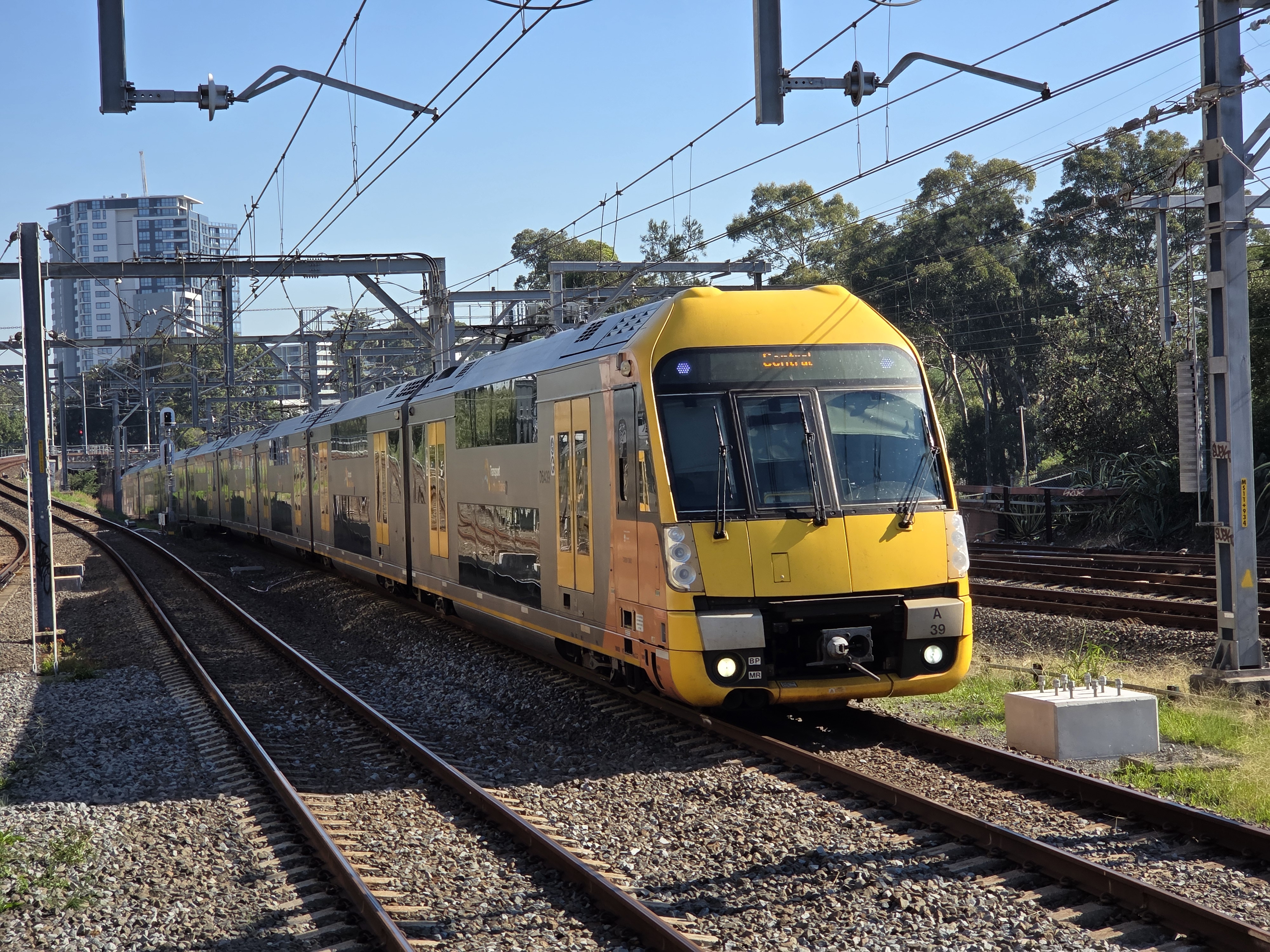
Waratah A set

Waratah B set

== Route ==
=== Map ===
T1 interactive map

=== Stations ===
Legend: Adjacent to a Metro station, Adjacent to a Light Rail station

List of T1 North Shore and Western Line stations
T1 North Shore & Western
Station	Image	Suburb	Opened	Grade	Connections
Berowra	Railway station	Berowra	7 April 1887	Ground	Central Coast & Newcastle Line
Mount Kuring-Gai	Railway station	Mount Kuring-gai	5 October 1901	Ground	none
Mount Colah	Railway station	Mount Colah	1 July 1887	Ground	none
Asquith	Railway station	Asquith	1 November 1915	Ground	Central Coast & Newcastle Line
Hornsby	Railway station	Hornsby	17 September 1886	Ground	T9 Northern Line Central Coast & Newcastle Line
Waitara	Railway station	Waitara	20 April 1895	Ground	none
Wahroonga	Railway station	Wahroonga	1 January 1890	Ground	none
Warrawee	Railway station	Warrawee	1 August 1900	Ground	none
Turramurra	Railway station	Turramurra	1 January 1890	Ground	none
Pymble	Railway station	Pymble	1 January 1890	Ground	none
Gordon	Railway station	Gordon	1 January 1890	Ground	T9 Northern Line Central Coast & Newcastle Line
Killara	Railway station	Killara	10 July 1899	Ground	T9 Northern Line
Lindfield	Railway station	Lindfield	1 January 1890	Ground	T9 Northern Line
Roseville	Railway station	Roseville	1 January 1890	Ground	T9 Northern Line
Chatswood	Railway station	Chatswood	1 January 1890	Elevated	M1 Metro North West & Bankstown Line T9 Northern Line
Artarmon	Railway station	Artarmon	6 July 1898	Ground	T9 Northern Line Central Coast & Newcastle Line
St Leonards	Railway station	St Leonards	1 January 1890	Ground	T9 Northern Line Central Coast & Newcastle Line
Wollstonecraft	Railway station	Wollstonecraft	1 May 1893	Ground	T9 Northern Line Central Coast & Newcastle Line
Waverton	Railway station	Waverton	1 May 1893	Ground	T9 Northern Line Central Coast & Newcastle Line
North Sydney	Railway station	North Sydney	20 March 1932	Built over	T9 Northern Line Central Coast & Newcastle Line
Milsons Point	Railway station	Milsons Point	1 May 1893	Elevated	T9 Northern Line Central Coast & Newcastle Line
Wynyard	Railway station	Sydney CBD	28 February 1932	Underground	T2 Leppington & Inner West Line T3 Liverpool & Inner West Line T8 Airport & South Line T9 Northern Line CBD and South East Light Rail Central Coast & Newcastle Line
Town Hall	Railway station	Sydney CBD	28 February 1932	Underground	T2 Leppington & Inner West Line T3 Liverpool & Inner West Line T4 Eastern Suburbs & Illawarra Line T8 Airport & South Line T9 Northern Line CBD and South East Light Rail Central Coast & Newcastle Line
Central	Metro station	Sydney CBD	5 August 1906	Ground	M1 Metro North West & Bankstown Line T2 Leppington & Inner West Line T3 Liverpool & Inner West Line T4 Eastern Suburbs & Illawarra Line T8 Airport & South Line T9 Northern Line Dulwich Hill Line CBD and South East Light Rail Blue Mountains Line Central Coast & Newcastle Line South Coast Line
Redfern	Railway station	Redfern	1876	Ground	T2 Leppington & Inner West Line T3 Liverpool & Inner West Line T4 Eastern Suburbs & Illawarra Line T8 Airport & South Line T9 Northern Line Blue Mountains Line Central Coast & Newcastle Line South Coast Line Southern Highlands Line
Strathfield	Railway station	Strathfield	9 July 1876	Ground	T2 Leppington & Inner West Line T3 Liverpool & Inner West Line T9 Northern Line Blue Mountains Line Central Coast & Newcastle Line
Lidcombe	Railway station	Lidcombe	1 November 1858	Ground	T2 Leppington & Inner West Line T3 Liverpool & Inner West Line T6 Lidcombe & Bankstown Line Olympic Park railway line
Auburn	Railway station	Auburn	1877	Ground	T2 Leppington & Inner West Line
Clyde	Railway station	Clyde	1882	Ground	T2 Leppington & Inner West Line
Granville	Railway station	Granville	2 July 1860	Ground	T2 Leppington & Inner West Line
Harris Park	Railway station	Harris Park	1885	Ground	T2 Leppington & Inner West Line T5 Cumberland Line
Parramatta	Railway station	Parramatta	2 July 1860	Ground	T2 Leppington & Inner West Line T5 Cumberland Line Parramatta Light Rail Blue Mountains Line
Westmead	Railway station	Westmead	March 1883	Ground	T5 Cumberland Line Parramatta Light Rail
Wentworthville	Railway station	Wentworthville	1883	Ground	T5 Cumberland Line
Pendle Hill	Railway station	Pendle Hill	12 April 1924	Ground	T5 Cumberland Line
Toongabbie	Railway station	Toongabbie	26 April 1880	Ground	T5 Cumberland Line
Seven Hills	Railway station	Seven Hills	1 December 1863	Ground	T5 Cumberland Line
Blacktown	Railway station	Blacktown	4 July 1860	Ground	T5 Cumberland Line Blue Mountains Line
At Blacktown, the line branches. The northwestern branch is towards Richmond, and the Western branch is towards Emu Plains.
To Richmond
Marayong	Railway station	Marayong	2 October 1922	Ground	T5 Cumberland Line
Quakers Hill	Railway station	Quakers Hill	1872	Ground	T5 Cumberland Line
Schofields	Railway station	Schofields	1870	Ground	T5 Cumberland Line
Riverstone	Railway station	Riverstone	1 December 1864	Ground	T5 Cumberland Line
Vineyard	Railway station	Vineyard	4 July 1935	Ground	T5 Cumberland Line
Mulgrave	Railway station	Mulgrave	1 December 1864	Ground	T5 Cumberland Line
Windsor	Railway station	Windsor	1 December 1864	Ground	T5 Cumberland Line
Clarendon	Railway station	Clarendon	1870	Ground	T5 Cumberland Line
East Richmond	Railway station	Richmond	2 July 1939	Ground	T5 Cumberland Line
Richmond	Railway station	Richmond	1 December 1864	Ground	T5 Cumberland Line
To Emu Plains
Doonside	Railway station	Doonside	27 September 1880	Ground	none
Rooty Hill	Railway station	Rooty Hill	23 December 1861	Ground	none
Mount Druitt	Railway station	Mount Druitt	19 August 1881	Ground	none
St Marys	Railway station	St Marys	1 May 1862	Ground	none
Werrington	Railway station	Werrington	2 May 1868	Ground	none
Kingswood	Railway station	Kingswood	1 September 1887	Ground	none
Penrith	Railway station	Penrith	19 January 1863	Ground	Blue Mountains Line
Emu Plains	Railway station	Emu Plains	18 August 1868	Ground	Blue Mountains Line

=== Patronage ===
The following table shows the patronage of Sydney Trains network for the year ending 30 June 2024.

2025–26 Sydney Trains patronage by line (Note: Figures based on Opal tap on and tap off data)
T1 North Shore & Western Line	79,173,811	
T2 Leppington & Inner West Line	56,339,459	
T3 Liverpool & Inner West Line	11,756,216	(Note: T3 patronage split between former route via Bankstown and current route via Strathfield. The Bankstown route closed 30 September 2024.)
T4 Eastern Suburbs & Illawarra Line	63,990,365	
T5 Cumberland Line	7,629,714	
T6 Lidcombe & Bankstown Line	3,307,374	
Olympic Park railway line	2,400,479	
T8 Airport & South Line	54,235,162	
T9 Northern Line	39,379,659	
