= D'Arcy Wentworth =

Irish-Australian surgeon (1762–1827)

- Born: 14 February 1762; Portadown, County Armagh, Ireland
- Died: 7 July 1827 (aged 65); Homebush, New South Wales, Australia
- Resting place: St John's Cemetery, Parramatta
- Occupations: Surgeon, magistrate, landowner
- Years active: 1778−1825
- Criminal charge: Highway robbery, found not guilty
- Partner(s): Catherine Crowley (1772–1800), Maria Ainslie (1774–1841), Ann Lawes (1791–1849)
- Children: Crowley - 4 ( William Charles Wentworth; D'Arcy Wentworth Jr. ); Lawes - 8
- Relatives: William Wentworth-Fitzwilliam, 4th Earl Fitzwilliam (cousin)

D'Arcy Wentworth (14 February 1762 – 7 July 1827) was an Irish-Australian surgeon and the first paying passenger to arrive in the new colony of New South Wales. He served under the first seven governors of the Colony, and from 1810 to 1821, he was "great assistant" to Governor Lachlan Macquarie. Wentworth led a campaign for the rights and recognition of emancipists and for trial by jury.

== Early life ==
D'Arcy Wentworth was born in Portadown, County Armagh, Ireland, the sixth child and fourth son of Martha and D'Arcy Wentworth. His family had left Yorkshire for safe haven in Ireland after the execution of Thomas Wentworth, Earl of Strafford, in 1641. In 1778, aged sixteen, D'Arcy was apprenticed to Alexander Patton, a surgeon-apothecary, in nearby Tandragee. In 1782, he joined the Irish Volunteers, one of the local regiments formed during the American Revolutionary War, to defend Ireland against invasion from France; his commission as a junior officer was signed by George III. In May 1785, having completed a seven-year apprenticeship, D'Arcy left Ireland. He was seeking an appointment with the East India Company, and as the training of Irish surgeons was not recognised in England, it was necessary to go to London to gain accreditation.

== Life in England ==
Wentworth sailed on the mailboat from Donaghadee to Portpatrick in Scotland. First he went to South Yorkshire, as the guest of his cousin, William Fitzwilliam, 4th Earl Fitzwilliam, at "Wentworth Woodhouse". It was the beginning of a lifelong friendship. Fitzwilliam gave D'Arcy encouragement and advice. He attended Whig party gatherings and race meetings at York, Doncaster and Wakefield with Fitzwilliam, who introduced him to the societies of York and London, their up and coming lawyers, young politicians and aspiring bureaucrats.

On 1 December 1785, Wentworth went before the Court of Examiners of the Company of Surgeons in London. He qualified as a "Mate to Indiamen", eligible to work with the East India Company, once he had twelve months practical experience "walking the wards" in one of London's large charity hospitals. Wentworth accepted the invitation of Percivall Pott, one of his examiners, to "walk the wards" of St Bartholomew's, Smithfield under his direction. He attended lectures by other prominent physicians including John Hunter, and dissections held in the Company of Surgeons' anatomy theatre at the Old Bailey.

Wentworth waited in vain for a position to become available in the East India Company. Warren Hastings had brought peace to India, and the company had an oversupply of surgeons. Wentworth supported himself in London by mastering the art of card playing, gambling at card tables in several inns and coffee houses, but he found many of those who lost to him would simply refuse to pay.

Eventually, Wentworth pursued a number of prominent players who had defaulted on their debts. Chief Magistrate and novelist Henry Fielding described gambling as "the School in which most Highwaymen of great Eminence have been bred." Wentworth was arraigned before the Courts four times for highway robbery, but never convicted. On each occasion his defaulter either failed to appear to prosecute him, found himself unable to positively identify D'Arcy Wentworth, or sought only to name and shame him.

In March 1787, Fitzwilliam's patronage secured Wentworth a direction from the Home Office, to leave without delay for Portsmouth, where the First Fleet was making ready to sail to Botany Bay. He was to seek out John White, Principal Surgeon, on the Charlotte, who could advise him of any vacancies for assistant surgeons on the Fleet. D'Arcy learnt that to become a naval surgeon would require further accreditation from the Company of Surgeons. He returned to his studies, and on 5 July 1787, examined a second time by the Court of Examiners he qualified as an Assistant Surgeon, Second Mate, Third Rate.

== Arrival in the Colony of New South Wales ==
On 17 January 1790, Wentworth left England on the Second Fleet on board the Neptune, the most notorious of the convict transports. The neglect and ill treatment of her convicts resulted in the deaths of one hundred and forty-seven men and eleven women, over 30% of the convicts she transported. Wentworth was on board as a passenger; he had no influence, no position on the ship and no employment arranged in the Colony. He arrived in Sydney on 26 June 1790, and spent his first five weeks assisting the local surgeons to care for the newly arrived convicts.

The Colony was short of food, strict rationing had been in place for three months. Five weeks after the Neptune arrived, to avoid a worsening disaster, Governor Arthur Phillip sent nearly 200 convicts and their superintendents to Norfolk Island on the Surprize, en route to China. Wentworth went with them, "to act as an assistant to the surgeon there, being reputed to have the necessary requisites for such a situation".

Wentworth disembarked at Norfolk Island on 16 August 1790. The Commandant, Lieut. Governor Philip Gidley King appointed him as an unpaid Assistant Surgeon. On the island, he became friends with Captain John Hunter, whose vessel, HMS Sirius, had been wrecked on a sunken reef off the island five months earlier. Hunter and most of his crew were stranded on Norfolk Island for nearly a year, awaiting a vessel to return them to Sydney.

In December 1791, King appointed Wentworth to a second position on Norfolk Island, Superintendent of Convicts, responsible for overseeing up to 150 convict labourers on building projects, land clearing and farm work. In June 1793, Earl Fitzwilliam offered him a lifeline; he appointed his London lawyer, Charles Cookney, Wentworth's agent, making it possible for him to become an early trader in the Colony.

== Land grants and later subdivisions ==
By the time of his death in 1827, D'Arcy Wentworth had acquired around 22,000 acres of land.

The estate Darcyville was later subdivided as the “Toongabbee Subdivision”. Section 2 of this subdivision includes area along Wentworth Avenue to the North of the Railway line was made available for sale in 1886.

== Street names and suburbs ==
Wentworth Avenue is named in honour of D’Arcy Wentworth and his family who held land the parcel of land known as Darcyville in the area. The avenue is parallel to the railway line and extends from Bridge Road, Westmead, New South Wales to Toongabbie railway station, passing through the suburbs of Wentworthville, Wentworth Point and Pendle Hill in New South Wales.

== Public life ==
During his thirty-seven years in New South Wales, D'Arcy Wentworth served under the first seven governors of the Colony.

The second governor, Captain John Hunter, gave Wentworth permission to leave Norfolk Island, and he arrived back in Sydney on 5 March 1796. He had worked without a break for six years on the island. He received £40 a year as Superintendent of Convicts, but had not been paid for his work as Assistant Surgeon. His applications for leave and requests for his position to be regularised had been ignored. In London, Earl Fitzwilliam pursued the matter of payment for his service as Assistant Surgeon, and in 1798, as a result of his efforts, Wentworth was paid arrears of £160, for six years work.

Soon after Wentworth's return, Hunter appointed him to Sydney Cove Hospital as an Assistant Surgeon, replacing Samuel Leeds, who had disqualified himself though drunkenness. In Sydney, Hunter allowed several people, including Wentworth, to act as traders, in an attempt to break the power of the Rum Corps officers through competition, and to lower the price of commodities. On 11 May 1799, he appointed Wentworth Assistant Surgeon at Parramatta, in charge of the hospital there, replacing James Mileham, who was later court martialled for refusing to attend the settlers, free people, and others.

Wentworth took up duty at Parramatta Hospital, "two long sheds, built in the form of a tent, and thatched... capable of holding two hundred patients." "It was large and clean with a large vegetable garden attached to it." A week later, on 16 May 1799, Hunter granted him a fourteen year lease over six acres and twenty roods at Parramatta, on a knoll overlooking the river. Wentworth planted a dozen young Norfolk Island pines along the ridge line, and built a comfortable two storey house, that he named "Wentworth Woodhouse". John Price, surgeon on the Minerva, visited him there, he described it as "charmingly situated and, as John Milton says, 'Bosom'd high in tufted trees'."

=== Governor Philip Gidley King, RN, 28 September 1800 to 12 August 1806 ===
Wentworth had been friendly with Philip Gidley King on Norfolk Island. On 15 April 1800, King returned to Sydney from London with a dormant commission, to act as governor in the case of the death or during the absence of Captain John Hunter. During Hunter's final five months in the Colony, Wentworth provided friendship, assistance and undivided loyalty. His support rankled King. Wentworth had been friendly with Philip Gidley King on Norfolk Island, but when King took over as governor, he curtailed Wentworth's trading, impounded his trading stock and sent him back to Norfolk Island. John Grant, an emancipist, commented, "Governor King hates Hunter's friends."

=== Captain William Bligh, RN, 13 August 1806 to 26 January 1808 ===
Captain William Bligh, who succeeded King, had D'Arcy Wentworth court martialled for disrespect, the result of conflicting instructions given by the Governor. As a consequence of Bligh's belligerence, Wentworth supported Major George Johnston and John Macarthur in the Rum Rebellion on 26 January 1808, that overthrew the Governor and placed him under house arrest.

=== Major-General Lachlan Macquarie, CB, 1 January 1810 to 1 December 1821 ===
Lachlan Macquarie came ashore in Sydney on 1 January 1810. On 7 January he issued a Government and General Order declaring all official appointments made since Bligh's arrest null and void. On 20 February 1810, he ordered that D'Arcy Wentworth remain as Principal Surgeon, pending instructions from London. Macquarie recommended his appointment in his first despatch.

Under Governor Macquarie, D'Arcy Wentworth found great recognition. From the outset Macquarie respected his judgement, he placed new and heavy responsibilities on his shoulders, and Wentworth responded with absolute loyalty and diligence. Macquarie found him "indefagitable in his Exertions and Assiduity". The two men, both over six feet tall, were the same age, forty-seven, born a fortnight apart in 1762. They shared their generation's belief in the principles of the Enlightenment. They recognized that reason, science, and an exchange of ideas, knowledge and experience were necessary to progress the Colony and to achieve Macquarie's vision for a more harmonious and inclusive society.

On 31 March 1810, Macquarie appointed Wentworth Treasurer of the Colonial Police Fund, the consolidated revenue fund of the Colony. He was effectively the Treasurer of the Colony, responsible for receiving revenue raised from government activities, including three-quarters of all customs duties, fees collected at the port and town of Sydney, licensing fees from markets, inns, hotels and breweries, and the licences "recently issued to publicans for vending spirituous liquors".

On 7 April 1810, Macquarie made Wentworth a Commissioner of the new turnpike road to be built from Sydney to Parramatta and the Hawkesbury. On 17 May 1810, the Governor appointed Wentworth one of two Justices of the Peace. On 11 August 1810, D'Arcy Wentworth was made a member of the Court of Civil Jurisdiction.

On 6 October 1810, Macquarie announced Sydney was to have a single effective police force. He appointed D'Arcy Wentworth Chief Magistrate and Superintendent of Police.

In 1814, Macquarie set up the Native Institute for the Education of Indigenous Children, and appointed D'Arcy Wentworth to the committee of management. Wentworth had the respect and trust of the Aboriginal people in Sydney, they could take their grievances to him as Police Magistrate and could look to him for support and redress.

==== The Rum Hospital ====
One of Wentworth's achievements was the construction of new hospital for Sydney. In 1806, Governor Bligh reported the wooden hospital at Dawes Point, that arrived on the Second Fleet, was "rotten and decayed, not worth rep'g", and the other hospitals were in "a ruinous state". Macquarie confirmed this in his first despatch to London: "there will be an absolute necessity for building a new general hospital as soon as possible". It was necessary to provide "a proper place of reception, and more secure detention of the sick, and of moving it to a more airy and retired situation in the town". Without waiting for a reply, within two months the Governor had called for tenders.

Macquarie signed the contract for construction of a new hospital on 6 November 1810, with a consortium of businessmen – Garnham Blaxcell and Alexander Riley, later joined by D'Arcy Wentworth. They would receive convict labour and a monopoly on rum imports, from which they expected to recoup the cost of the building and gain considerable profits. The contract allowed them an exclusive right to import 45,000 (later increased to 60,000) gallons of rum to sell, with the excise collected, paid into the Colonial Fund. Their projected profit on the building of the hospital did not eventuate, as a result of many unforeseen problems and the cost of the remedial work required. On its completion in 1816, convict patients were transferred to the new hospital, known as the "Rum Hospital".

Wentworth made lifelong friends among his fellow surgeons and colleagues in the Colony, but he remained detached from its social castes and allegiances. Historian James Auchmuty commented that "despite his general popularity, comparative wealth and powerful connexions at home, Wentworth mixed little in non-official social life," observing, "the liberal views imbibed in the Ireland of his youth," which had "resulted in more than usual sympathy with the convict population," and "the circumstances of his personal life in the Colony prevented him from fully sharing in the social round."

==== Bank of New South Wales ====
The Colony of New South Wales was established without any cash. Coinage brought to the Colony leaked out rapidly, mainly on ships that called with necessities, clothes, food, and knick knacks. As a result there was insufficient coinage to permit normal business transactions, forcing the population to rely on local promissary notes and rum.

On 30 April 1810, Macquarie wrote to Lord Castlereagh:

there is one circumstance to which I beg your Lordship's most serious attention, as on it seems to hinge much of the future prosperity of this colony. In consequence of there being neither gold nor silver coins of any denomination, nor any legal currency, as a substitute for specie in the colony, the people have been in some degree forced on the expedient of issuing and receiving notes of hand to supply the place of real money, and this petty banking has thrown open a door to frauds and impositions of a most grievous nature to the country at large…At present the agricultural and commercial pursuits of the territory are very much impeded and obstructed by the want of some adequately secured circulating medium.

Under D'Arcy Wentworth, the Colonial Fund had a quasi-bank role, printing and issuing bank notes to people who had claims on the Fund. Wentworth had the Sydney Gazette print books of notes, labelled Police Fund, with four different Sterling values: two shillings and sixpence, five shillings, ten shillings and one pound. To protect against forgery, he had a Latin quotation from Cicero with a decorative border printed on the reverse side, and he signed each note. They circulated throughout the Colony, helping to overcome the shortage of small change.

The idea of establishing a bank was raised in March 1810, but it wasn't until November 1816 that a meeting was held to discuss the proposal. In February 1817, the Bank of New South Wales was established; Macquarie gave it a Charter as a joint stock company, providing its directors with limited liability. The first directors were: D'Arcy Wentworth, John Harris, Robert Jenkins, Thomas Wylde, Alexander Riley, William Redfern and John Thomas Campbell. Campbell, Macquarie's secretary, was elected the bank's first president; D'Arcy Wentworth was elected president in 1825. The new bank facilitated financial transactions and encouraged commerce; it helped bring to an end the Colony's dependence on rum as money, and the need for dubious promissary notes. The bank received deposits from the Colonial Fund, previously held by Wentworth.

==== Macquarie and the Emancipists ====
In his third despatch to London, written on Easter Monday 1810, Macquarie reported on what he saw was the Colony's most pressing problem:

"I was very much surprised and Concerned, on my Arrival here, at the extraordinary and illiberal Policy I found had been adopted by all the Persons who had preceded me in Office, respecting those Men who had been originally sent out to this Country as Convicts, but who, by long Habits of Industry and total Reformation of Manners, had not only become respectable, but by Many Degrees the most Useful Members of the Community. Those persons have never been Countenanced or received into Society." "I have nevertheless, taken upon my self to adopt a new Line of Conduct, Conceiving that Emancipation, when united with Rectitude and long-tried good Conduct, should lead a Man back to that Rank in Society which he had forfeited, and do away, in as far as the Case will admit, All Retrospect of former bad Conduct. This appears to me to be the greatest inducement that Can be held out towards the Reformation of Manners of the establishment, and I think it is Consistent with the gracious and humane Intentions of His Majesty and His Ministers."

Macquarie welcomed the emancipists into society, he appointed them to positions in the public sector, reversing the previous policy towards former convicts. Most likely D'Arcy Wentworth had advocated on their behalf, for Macquarie had assumed he was an emancipist. He listed for Castlereagh the men who gave the most liberal assistance to government and conducted themselves with the greatest propriety, whom he had: "admitted to my table",

"namely Mr D'Arcy Wentworth, principal Surgeon; Mr William Redfern, Assistant Surgeon; Mr Andrew Thompson, an opulent Farmer and Proprietor of Land; and Mr Simeon Lord, an opulent Merchant.",

On 26 July 1811, Lord Liverpool acknowledged the principles Macquarie had outlined.

The Governor resolutely pursued his new Line of Conduct, championing emancipists of good conduct, raising them into key positions of authority and to a new rank in society. His approach startled and dismayed the Exclusives and wealthier free settlers, and met immediate opposition within the barracks, from the officers of the 73rd Regiment, sent to the Colony to replace the discredited Rum Corps. The most vigorous opponents of the Governor's new inclusiveness were the clergy and judiciary. They worked to frustrate and denigrate his progress, and complained noisily to London. They petitioned Members of Parliament, the Colonial Office and influential spokesmen within their own hierarchies, belaboring them with an increasing stream of grievances and gossip. D'Arcy, working close to Macquarie, became an easy target for much of the venom directed towards the Governor.

In London, Opposition support for their campaign spurred the Secretary of State, Earl Bathurst, to propose in April 1817: "the appointment of commissioners who shall forthwith proceed to the settlement with full powers to investigate all the complaints which have been made, both with respect to the treatment of convicts, and the general administration of the government."

==== John Thomas Bigge & his Report ====
Nearly two years later, on 19 January 1819, John Thomas Bigge was appointed Commissioner of Inquiry, with a private instruction from Earl Bathurst to end Macquarie's dream of an inclusive society in the Colony.

Bigge did not attack Macquarie directly in his report, tabled in Parliament in 1822 and 1823, though he maligned him to the authorities in London. In his attempt to discredit Macquarie, Bigge's report took aim at those closest to the Governor. He attacked D'Arcy Wentworth in particular, personally and professionally, and others who supported Macquarie's policy of a more inclusive society, including William Redfern and J.T. Campbell, the Governor's Secretary.

In May 1818, D'Arcy Wentworth had submitted his resignation as Principal Surgeon. Macquarie recommended that William Redfern, his Assistant Surgeon, an emancipist, replace him. Bigge opposed his appointment. On 23 October 1819, three weeks after James Bowman, Wentworth's replacement, arrived with Commissioner Bigge, he retired as Principal Surgeon. He had served 29 years as a surgeon in New South Wales, ten of those as Principal Surgeon.

In March 1820, Wentworth resigned as Superintendent of Police, and six months later, he resigned as Treasurer of the Police Fund. A few months later, on 26 March 1821, Wentworth's replacement William Minchin died. Macquarie persuaded him to return as Superintendent of Police and Treasurer of the Colonial Revenue, writing to Earl Bathurst, "there was no-one else in the Colony capable of performing the duties". D'Arcy agreed to his request.

On 31 January 1822, his sixtieth birthday, Macquarie invited D'Arcy and other close friends to celebrate. At day break on 12 February 1822, with his wife Elizabeth and son Lachlan, he passed through an "immense concourse" to the harbour, filled with "a great gathering of launches, barges, cutters, pinnaces and wherries", and went aboard the Surry, for the voyage home.

=== Major-General Sir Thomas Brisbane, CB, 1 December 1821 to 1 December 1825 ===
D'Arcy Wentworth continued to serve and advise Macquarie's successor, Governor Thomas Brisbane. He remained Treasurer of the Colonial Revenue until the arrival of his replacement, William Balcombe, in April 1824. Brisbane recommended him as chairman of the Court of Quarter Sessions, and he was elected by his brother magistrates in November 1824, but he declined, reluctant to implement the more punitive regime recommended by Bigge, and to be responsible for ensuring his fellow magistrates did likewise. He served as Superintendent of Police until Captain Francis Rossi arrived to replace him on 19 May 1825, when he retired altogether from public life. The Bench of Magistrates publicly thanked him on his retirement, stating they "echoed the Public voice", and were "indebted to his superior information in dispensing Justice".

As a public official, Wentworth's capacity to advocate openly for reform had been constrained. Free of the obligations of public office, he was free to give his full support to the emancipist cause, to enter political debate, and to work with his son William Charles, as an advocate for an independent constitution for the Colony. In October he made a formal request to Brisbane, with two Parramatta magistrates, for "respectable" emancipists to be added to the lists of jurors. Brisbane sent their petition to Earl Bathurst for his attention.

In May 1825, Governor Brisbane was recalled. On 26 October 1825, D'Arcy Wentworth presented an Address of Farewell to him on behalf of the Emancipists. He arranged the Official Farewell Dinner for the Governor, with one hundred guests, at the Woolpack Inn in Parramatta on 7 November 1825. D'Arcy sat beside the Governor at the dinner, but he was ill and he retired early.

His son William proposed the toasts, to the King, to Governor Thomas Brisbane, to the prosperity of Australia and to the memory of Governor Phillip. In solemn silence they toasted the memory of Governor Macquarie. Then they charged their glasses and drank to the health of D'Arcy Wentworth. William returned thanks on his behalf, acknowledging he was proud to be the son of such a worthy man, proud that the community possessed this "upright and zealous friend of liberty".

At his farewell dinner, Governor Brisbane, in defiance of the Exclusives and the Bigge Report, recognised the importance and significance of the Emancipists, and he undertook to champion their cause with the British Government.

=== Lieut. General Sir Ralph Darling, GCH, 19 December 1825 to 21 October 1831 ===
Governor Ralph Darling arrived in Sydney on 17 December 1825, to actively implement the socially destructive policies recommended in the Bigge Report. Darling's policies made life more punitive for the convicts and more onerous for the soldiers. Emancipists and convicts were now excluded from Government employment. Freed convicts who had been given pardons by the Crown were now dealt with by the courts as convicts without status; emancipists and descendants of convicts were excluded from Government House.

Under Darling, no longer an officer of the Crown, D'Arcy Wentworth was free to promote the cause of the Emancipists and trial by jury, and he became their figure head and leader. The press came under pressure for its criticism of the Governor and government policies. D'Arcy initially led the protagonists supporting freedom of the press, a fully elected representative government for the Colony, and no taxation without representation. Amongst the leading agitators were The Australian newspaper and its proprietors: two barristers, Robert Wardell and William Charles Wentworth, D'Arcy Wentworth's son. Following Darling's persecution of two soldiers, Sudds and Thompson in November 1826, that resulted in the death of Sudds, The Australian pressed for the recall of Governor Darling. William Wentworth became the voice for representative government for the Colony and for Governor Darling's recall.

== Private life ==
On board the convict transport Neptune Wentworth entered a relationship with a convict girl, Catherine Crowley. She remained his partner in the Colony until her death at Parramatta in January 1800. Their son William Charles Wentworth was born at sea on the Surprize, standing off Norfolk Island in a violent storm on 13 August 1790; a daughter, Martha, died at four months, during an outbreak of fever carried by the Third Fleet; two more sons followed: Dorset (D'Arcy) born in 1793, and Matthew (John) in 1795.

After Catherine's death, D'Arcy and his sons moved to Sydney; in 1801, two convicts were assigned to him; one, Catherine Melling, lived in and cared for his three sons, aged ten, seven and six. A year later, after she left to be married, Maria Ainsley, an emancipist and widow, took her place and brought her own young son to live with them. Maria became a mother figure to D'Arcy's three sons, and they loved her. In 1807, Fitzwilliam, appalled by reports of Bligh's behaviour towards D'Arcy Wentworth, applied to Viscount Castlereagh, Secretary of State for the Colonies, for him to be given leave of absence to return to London. Fitzwilliam wrote again the following year, to inform Castlereagh that Wentworth had been: "suspended from the duties of his office & consequently from its emoluments, this devoted man is retained a prisoner in the Colony."

Bligh named D'Arcy Wentworth as one of the twelve ringleaders of the Rum Rebellion, declaring them to be in a state of mutiny and rebellion He wanted them arrested and charged with treason. He forbad them leaving the Colony under any circumstances, proclaiming that ships' masters would take them, at their peril.

In late July 1808, Wentworth finally received permission from Lord Castlereagh to leave the Colony, allowing him to return to England, but it had come too late. Bligh was under house arrest in Government House, his rage undiminished, and plans were under way for him to return to England. All those involved in the Rum Rebellion anticipated harsh repercussions. Wentworth knew Bligh's anger would be directed at him; he believed he would be arrested and charged with treason when he arrived in England. He expected no leniency. He resolved to remain in the Colony and see out the storm from a safe distance. He replied, "I am under the painful necessity of declining to avail myself of the leave granted me, until the result be known."

One evening in 1810, a young woman, Ann Lawes, came to D'Arcy's house in Sydney seeking medical attention. She was weeping, she had been cruelly beaten by her husband and was afraid to return home, even to her own child. D'Arcy took pity on her, he gave her shelter for the night and next morning returned her to the house of her employer, William Gore, the Provost Marshall. Ann Lawes, a free woman, had come to the Colony in 1806 with the Gore family, as nanny and governess to his four children. They travelled with Governor Bligh on the Lady Sinclair.

After the Rum Rebellion on 26 January 1806, Gore was arrested and imprisoned; his wife, Ann and the children were evicted and on 29 February his effects sold at auction. During this period of uncertainty Ann Lawes had married James Macneal.

When Wentworth returned Ann to the Gore's house, he asked about her situation. Gore, reinstated by Macquarie, told him Ann's husband was violent and had threatened to murder her. D'Arcy offered her temporary shelter and she remained with him; they had eight children, the last born after his father's death: George Wentworth (1810–1851), Martha Wentworth (1813–1847), Sophia Wentworth (1816–1878), Robert Charles Wentworth (1818), Charles John Wentworth (1819–1854), Mary-Ann Wentworth (1820–1870), Katherine Wentworth (1825–1898), D'Arcy Charles Wentworth (1828–1866).

Wentworth's hopes for a quiet retirement were disrupted by the arrival of Commissioner Bigge, who asserted his authority over the Governor, attacking him and his administration. Wentworth was called to attend Macquarie, as stress and despair affected his health.

In 1821, Wentworth leased "Wentworth Woodhouse" in Parramatta and moved to his farm "Home Bush". By 1823, he had acquired 17,000 acres of land, using it to produce meat for the Colony as he had done on Norfolk Island. In the early 1800s, he bought a prize stallion named Hector, imported from India, from Arthur Wellesley, later Duke of Wellington. When Hector arrived, there were fewer than three hundred horses in the Colony, by 1821, there were more than four thousand.

With his prize sire, Wentworth bred carriage horses and racehorses, Hector was the great foundation sire of Australian Cavalry horses known as Walers, from New South Wales. The first exports of Walers, as light cavalry horses, began in 1816. In the First World War around one hundred and sixty thousand Walers were sent overseas; between 1861 and 1931 almost half a million were exported.

== Death ==
In the winter of 1827, a severe strain of influenza swept through the Colony. On Saturday, 7 July 1827, a cold winter morning, D'Arcy Wentworth died of pneumonia at "Home Bush".

On Monday 9 July, despite dreadful weather and the risk of influenza, a funeral procession more than a mile long, with forty carriages and more than fifty men on horseback, accompanied his hearse on its journey to Parramatta. D'Arcy Wentworth was buried there, in St John's cemetery. The inscription on his tomb reads: "an honest man, the noblest work of God". He left two mature sons, William Charles and D'Arcy, children of Catherine Crowley, and seven children with Mary Ann Lawes, three sons and four daughters; their fourth son was born in 1828. Wentworth named her in his will as: "my dear friend Ann Lawes the mother of seven of my children". After his funeral the mourners gathered at Hannah Walker's Red Cow Inn at Parramatta, to salute his life and drink a toast to his memory.

The Monitor described D'Arcy Wentworth as "a lover of liberty on whom the people could rely, the natural protector of the people's rights. He was a lover of freedom; a constant and steady friend to the people; a kind and liberal master; a just and humane magistrate; a steady friend".

The Australian noted his reputation as a doctor and as a magistrate:

"As a medical practitioner, Mr Wentworth was distinguished for his tenderness with which he treated his patients of every degree, and that class of unfortunate persons whom the charge of General Hospital placed so extensively under his care. He was peculiarly skilful in treating the diseases of children… As an able, upright and impartial Magistrate, Mr Wentworth's merits were well remembered by all classes of the community".

The Sydney Gazette acknowledged Wentworth had "studiously devoted the best part of his eventful life to the service of its public, he was loyal from principle, and indefatigable in his public career; a Patriot in whom were blended the political virtues of loyalty and independence".

== Recognition and legacy ==
The Sydney suburbs of Wentworthville and Wentworth Point, the New South Wales town, Wentworth, the federal electorate of Wentworth, more than sixty avenues, drives, places, roads, streets and ways in Sydney, and more than twenty in both Melbourne and Brisbane, are named Wentworth, in honour of D'Arcy and his son, William Charles. Darcy Street (formerly D'Arcy Street), within Parramatta, was named for D'Arcy Wentworth. Woodhouse Lane, also within Parramatta, was named after the two storey house, "Wentworth Woodhouse", he built nearby. In 1824, explorer Hamilton Hume named an imposing peak in the Victorian Central Highlands, Mount Wentworth, after D'Arcy Wentworth. In 1836, Sir Thomas Mitchell noting that Port Philip was visible from the summit, renamed it Mount Macedon.
