= Pendle Hill, New South Wales =

Pendle Hill
- Suburb
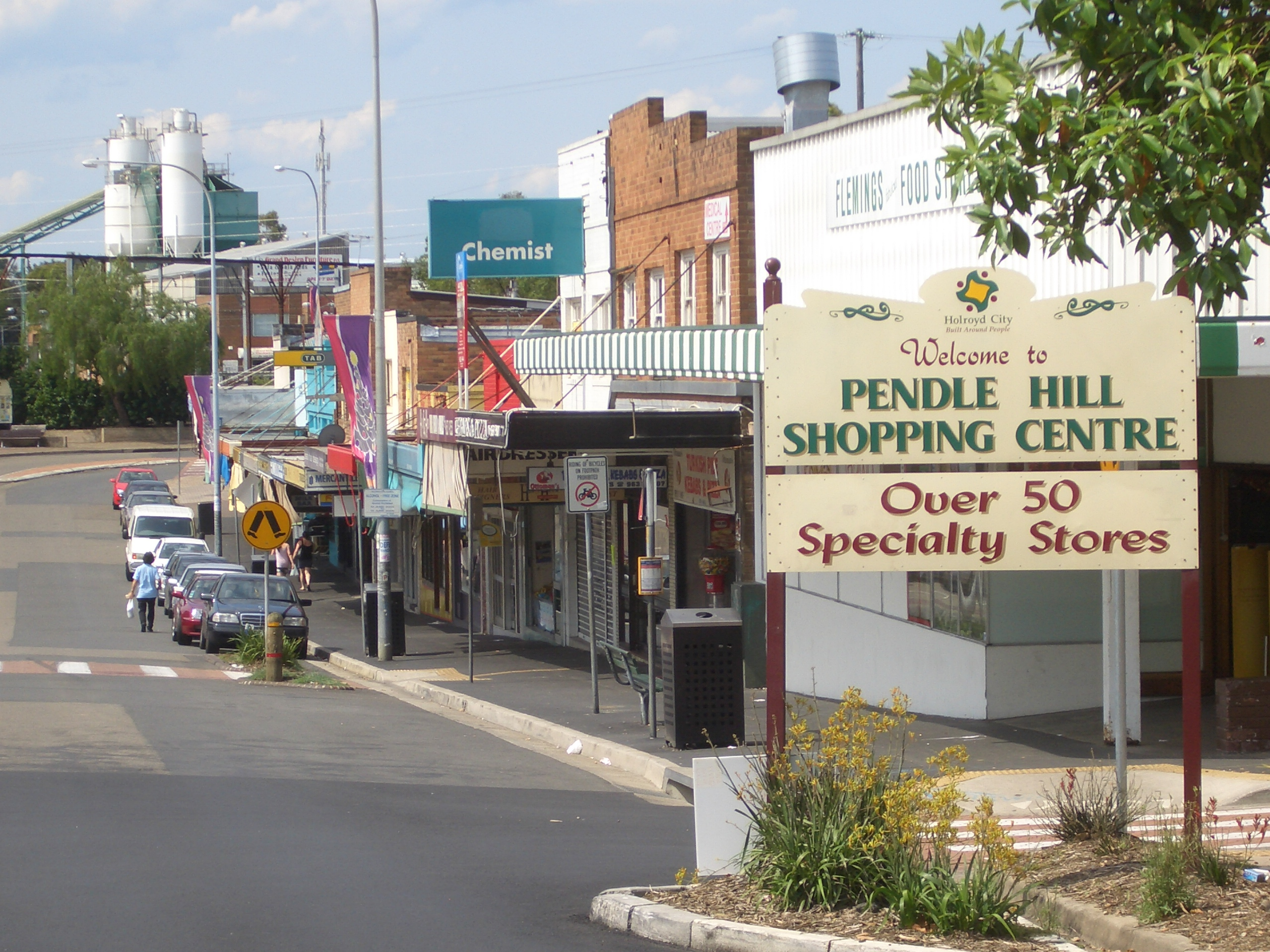
- Pendle Hill shopping centre in 2007

- Interactive map of Pendle Hill
- Coordinates: 33°48′27″S 150°57′19″E
- Country: Australia
- State: New South Wales
- City: Sydney
- LGAs: Cumberland Council; City of Parramatta
- Location: 29 km (18 mi) west of Sydney CBD

Government
  - State electorates: Prospect; Winston Hills
  - Federal division: Parramatta

Area
  - Total: 1.92 km^{2} (0.74 sq mi)
- Elevation: 45 m (148 ft)

Population
  - Total: 7,743 (2021 census)
  - Density: 4,033/km^{2} (10,445/sq mi)
- Postcode: 2145
Suburbs around Pendle Hill
Toongabbie	Toongabbie	Old Toongabbie
Girraween	Pendle Hill	Wentworthville
Greystanes	Greystanes	South Wentworthville

Pendle Hill is a suburb of Sydney, in the state of New South Wales, Australia. Pendle Hill is located 29 kilometres west of the Sydney central business district, in the local government areas of Cumberland Council (Wentworthville Ward) and City of Parramatta (Parramatta Ward) and is part of the Greater Western Sydney region.

== History ==
The area that is now Pendle Hill was inhabited by the Dharug people prior to colonisation.

Governor Arthur Phillip made camp overnight on the banks of a creek (now Pendle Creek) on 25 April 1788.

The Colony was facing a food crisis in 1790 and things deteriorated in 1793 with public farming crop failures.

In August 1819, D’Arcy Wentworth was given a land grant to assist with food production to the Colony. European settlers commenced clearing of the land for farming purposes, including animals for meat, with local farms and merchants.

The area around Pendle Hill was first owned as part of the Darcyville estate which extended from Westmead to Toongabbie. This was owned by D'Arcy Wentworth and family until being subdivided in the late 1800s. The map of the Toongabbie estate subdivision in the reference below shows Toongabbie station leading to Parramatta station as the Pendle Hill, Wentworthville and Westmead railway stations had not yet been built.

Toongabbie is one of the oldest suburbs in Sydney and could originally be reached by tall ships via Toongabbie Creek. (Now, the Rivercat only goes as far as Parramatta and no longer can anyone travel further West by boat via this passage).

Castrella was the historic family home of William Hart Junior, a timber merchant. This villa was built in 1888 and can still be seen today. Between Pendle Hill and Wentworthville stations, on Wentworth Avenue there are two historic houses next to each other. The first house you is Castrella set back from the road surrounded by Australian gum trees. The second historic house was built after Castrella and is attached to and now run as a child care centre. The subdivisions of land parcels were large and these two historic houses are heritage listed.

George Bond (1876–1950), an American who came to Australia in 1909, established a cotton picking business in 1903. It was Australia's first attempt to spin and weave cotton from cotton farms that the company owned in Queensland. Lancashire was the centre of England's cotton industry, and Pendle Hill is a hill in the heart of the Lancashire cotton industry. It seems likely this is where the town gained its name. George Bond was originally in the business of importing hosiery and underwear but during World War I began manufacturing hosiery in Redfern and by 1925 was producing a quarter of Australia's output of hosiery and knitted garments. Bond Industries Limited became a public company in 1927.

The railway station at Pendle Hill opened on 12 April 1924. The first government school opened in 1955 and the first post office was opened in 1956 by Postmaster Sqn. Ldr.[Rtd] Richard R. Purdie M.B.E. and his wife Elsie. Nearby Purdie Lane is named after these long time pioneers of Pendle Hill.

In 1975, the Maltese Monument was unveiled at Civic Park, Pendle Hill; with the President of Malta and builder Frank Cefai. It was a Bicentennial gift from the Maltese Community "to commemorate the presence, contribution and development of the State of NSW by the Maltese community". An annual memorial service is held at the Monument to mark the anniversary of the Maltese uprising, known as Sette Giugno, which occurred on 7 June 1919 against British rule, which is now a national holiday in Malta.

== Commercial area ==
Pendle Hill has a large shopping centre with over 50 specialty shops beside the railway station. It contains many supermarkets, discount stores, medical centers, grocery shops, specialty shops, real-estate agents, ATMs, cafes, fish markets and butchers.

== Transport ==
Pendle Hill railway station on the Main Western line was opened in 1924 and currently is served by the T1 and T5 services of Sydney Trains. The railway station is also serviced by 16 different bus lines stopping at Joyce St opp Pendle Hill Station.

== Schools ==
- Pendle Hill Public School is a primary school.
- Pendle Hill High School is a secondary school.

== Parks ==
Civic Park is a large park located just west of the railway station. It connects the shopping centre to the suburb of Girraween, and is frequently used as a thoroughfare for pedestrians heading to and from the railway station. Civic Park now contains two tennis courts, a small gym, table tennis tables, a small playground, ample open green space and a half court basketball facility.

Binalong Park (also known as Binalong Oval) is a large oval in the north of Pendle Hill bordering Toongabbie. The park contains two tennis courts, four netball courts and four ovals. These both are particularly popular for sporting lessons, and weekend sporting events. The grounds are home to the Pendle Hill Tigers football club who compete in the Granville district Football Association and Pendle Hill Colts Cricket Club, who compete in the Parramatta District Cricket association, competitions at both junior and senior level. The netball courts are the training venue for Pendle Hill Netball Club Inc., who compete in the Blacktown City Netball Association competitions at junior and senior level.
