= Blacktown railway station =

Railway station in Sydney, New South Wales, Australia

Blacktown
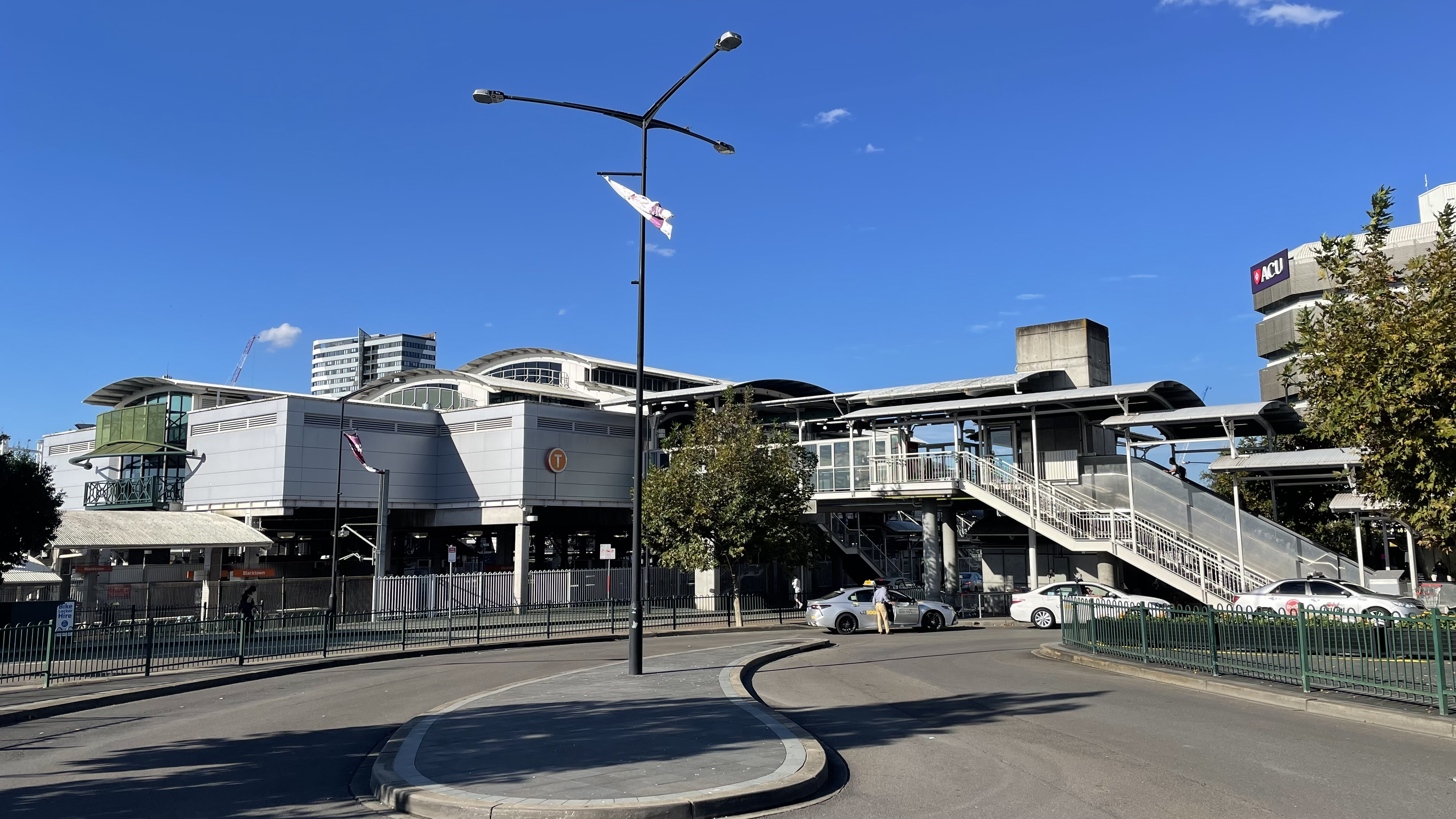
- Exterior view of the main concourse in April 2022

General information
- Location: Main Street, Blacktown; Sydney, New South Wales; Australia
- Coordinates: 33°46′06″S 150°54′26″E
- Elevation: 64 metres (210 ft)
- Owner: Transport Asset Manager of NSW
- Operator: Sydney Trains
- Lines: Main Western; Richmond
- Distance: 34.87 km (21.67 mi) from Central
- Platforms: 7 (3 island, 1 side)
- Tracks: 7
- Connections: Bus

Construction
- Structure type: Ground
- Parking: 320 spaces
- Accessible: Yes

Other information
- Status: Weekdays: Staffed: 24/7: Weekends and public holidays: Staffed: 24/7
- Station code: BAK
- Website: Transport for NSW

History
- Opened: 4 July 1860 (166 years ago)
- Rebuilt: 14 October 1995 (30 years ago)
- Electrified: Yes (from February 1955)
- Former names: Blacktown Road (1860–1862)

Passengers
- 2025: 8,244,347 (year); 22,587 (daily) (Sydney Trains)
- Rank: 19

Services
Preceding station	Sydney Trains	Following station
Marayong towards Richmond	North Shore & Western Line	Seven Hills towards Berowra
Doonside towards Emu Plains	North Shore & Western Line	Seven Hills towards Berowra
Marayong towards Richmond	Cumberland Line	Seven Hills towards Leppington
Preceding station	Intercity Trains	Following station
Penrith towards Lithgow	Blue Mountains Line	Parramatta towards Central
Preceding station	NSW TrainLink	Following station
Penrith towards Dubbo	NSW TrainLink Western Line Dubbo XPT	Parramatta towards Sydney
Location

Blacktown railway station is a suburban railway station located on both the Main Western line and Richmond line, serving the Sydney suburb of Blacktown. It is served by Sydney Trains T1 Western Line and T5 Cumberland Line services as well as intercity Blue Mountains Line and NSW TrainLink Central West Express services.

== History ==
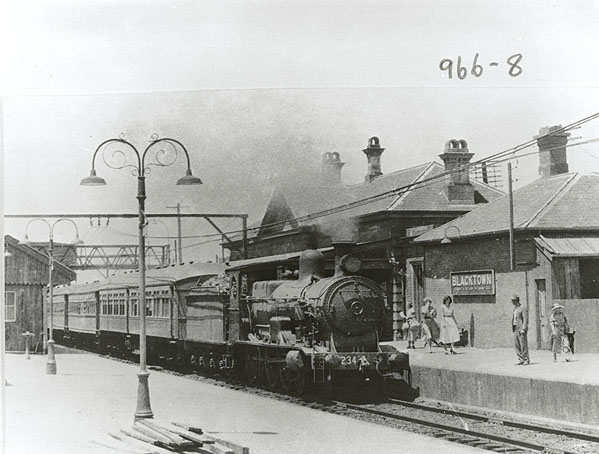
The station in 1955

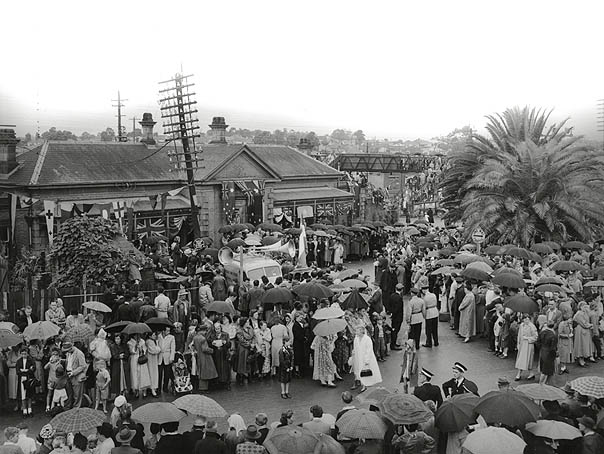
The station in 1955 at the opening of the electric train service

Blacktown station opened on 2 July 1860 as Blacktown Road with the construction of the Main Western line.

Captain Martindale, the colony's chief engineer, was not happy with work done by contractor John Gibbons and refused to issue a certificate for work done. Not happy with the decision Gibbons told his men to remove three portions of the track near Parramatta. He was arrested and placed in the Parramatta Watch House before being released on bail. Two days later the first train ran into Blacktown Road station. The station was renamed Blacktown on 1 August 1862.

The station received a major rebuild in the 1990s to a modern glass and steel structure with the addition of an extra platform and the provision of lift access to all platforms. It was opened on 14 October 1995 by Prime Minister Paul Keating. A bus interchange was also built in the triangle between the Main Western and Richmond lines.

== Services ==
=== Platforms ===
Platform	Line	Stopping pattern	Notes
1	North Shore & Western Line	Services to North Sydney, Hornsby or Berowra via Central	
1	North Shore & Western Line	Terminating express services to & from Central via Parramatta	Only 3 evening weekday peak hours services depart from here
1	Cumberland Line	Services to Liverpool & Leppington	T5 Liverpool services operate weekends only
2	North Shore & Western Line	Services to Schofields & Richmond	
2	Cumberland Line	Services to Schofields & Richmond	T5 Richmond services operate weeknights only
3	North Shore & Western Line	Terminating services to & from Berowra or Hornsby via Central	Terminating platform
3	North Shore & Western Line	Terminating express services to & from Central via Parramatta	Only 3 evening weekday peak hour services depart from here
3	Cumberland Line	Terminating services to & from Leppington	Terminating platform
4	North Shore & Western Line	Services to Berowra, Hornsby, Lindfield or North Sydney via Central	
5	North Shore & Western Line	Services to Berowra or Hornsby via Central	Mainly used during weekday peak hours
5	Blue Mountains Line	services to Sydney Central	
5	Western Region	Services to Sydney Central	Set down only
6	North Shore & Western Line	Services to Penrith & Emu Plains	Mainly used during weekday peak hours
6	Blue Mountains Line	Services to Springwood, Katoomba, Mount Victoria & Lithgow	
6	Western Region	Services to Dubbo	Pick up only
7	North Shore & Western Line	Services to Penrith & Emu Plains	

=== Transport links ===
Blacktown Station Bus Interchange

Stand A: Busways

- 752: to Rouse Hill station via Quakers Hill and The Ponds

Stand B: Busways

- 753 to Doonside
- 756: to Mount Druitt via Woodcroft and Plumpton

Stand C: Busways

- 750: to Mount Druitt via Richmond Road and Bidwill
- 751: to Melonba via Colebee and Marsden Park
- 754: to Mount Druitt via Glendenning and Hassall Grove

Stand D: NightRide

- N70: Penrith station to Town Hall station
- N71: Richmond station to Town Hall station

Stand E: Busways

- 728: to Mount Druitt via Bungarribee and Rooty Hill
- 729: to Mount Druitt via Eastern Creek and Minchinbury

Stand F: Busways

- 723: to Mount Druitt via Eastern Creek
- 724: to Arndell Park, peak hour extension to Huntingwood
- 726: to Doonside station

Stand G: Busways

- 721: to Blacktown Hospital
- 722: to Prospect Evening service combined with route 724

Stand H: CDC NSW

- 700: to Parramatta station via Prospect and Girraween
- 702: to Seven Hills

Stand J: Transit Systems

- 800: to Fairfield station via Polding Street
- 812: peak hours only to Fairfield station via The Horsley Drive

Stand K: CDC NSW

- 705: to Parramatta station via Lalor Park and Pendle Hill
- 711: to Parramatta station via Seven Hills and Wentworthville

Stand L: CDC NSW

- 611: to Macquarie Park via M2 Motorway
- 630: to Epping via Seven Hills and Baulkham Hills

Stand M: Busways and CDC NSW (706 and 661)

- 706: to Parramatta station via Winston Hills
- 744: to Blacktown Industrial Area
- S7: to Parklea Garden Village Shopper Hopper
- 661: to Parramatta station via Kings Langley
- 730: to Castle Hill via Glenwood and Norwest Business Park
- 731: to Rouse Hill Station via Stanhope Gardens
- 732: to Rouse Hill Station via Acacia Gardens and Quakers Hill
- 734: to Riverstone via Schofields
- 735: to Rouse Hill

Stand N: Busways

- 743: to Kings Langley via Kings Park

== Trackplan ==
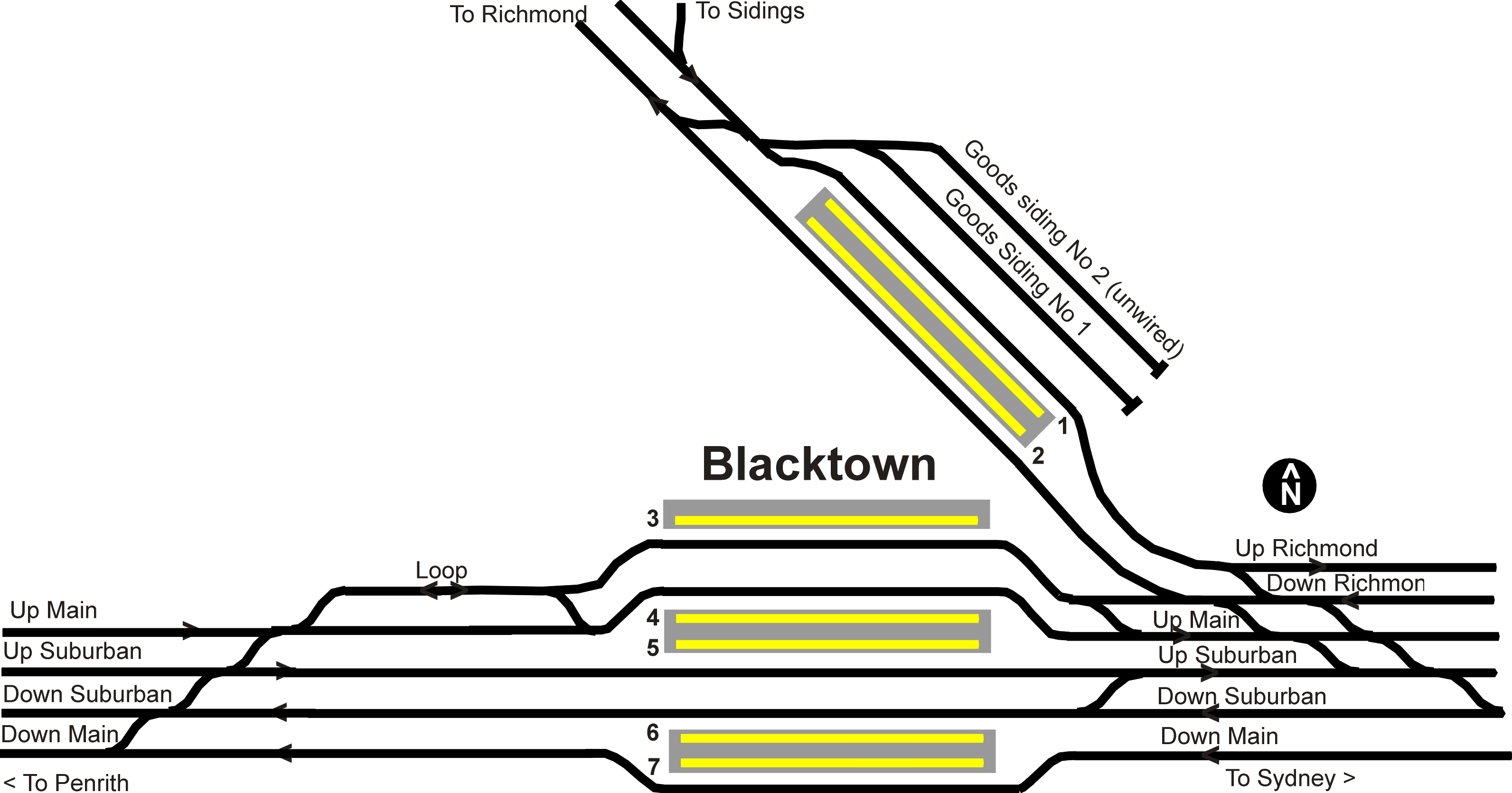
Track layout

== Gallery ==
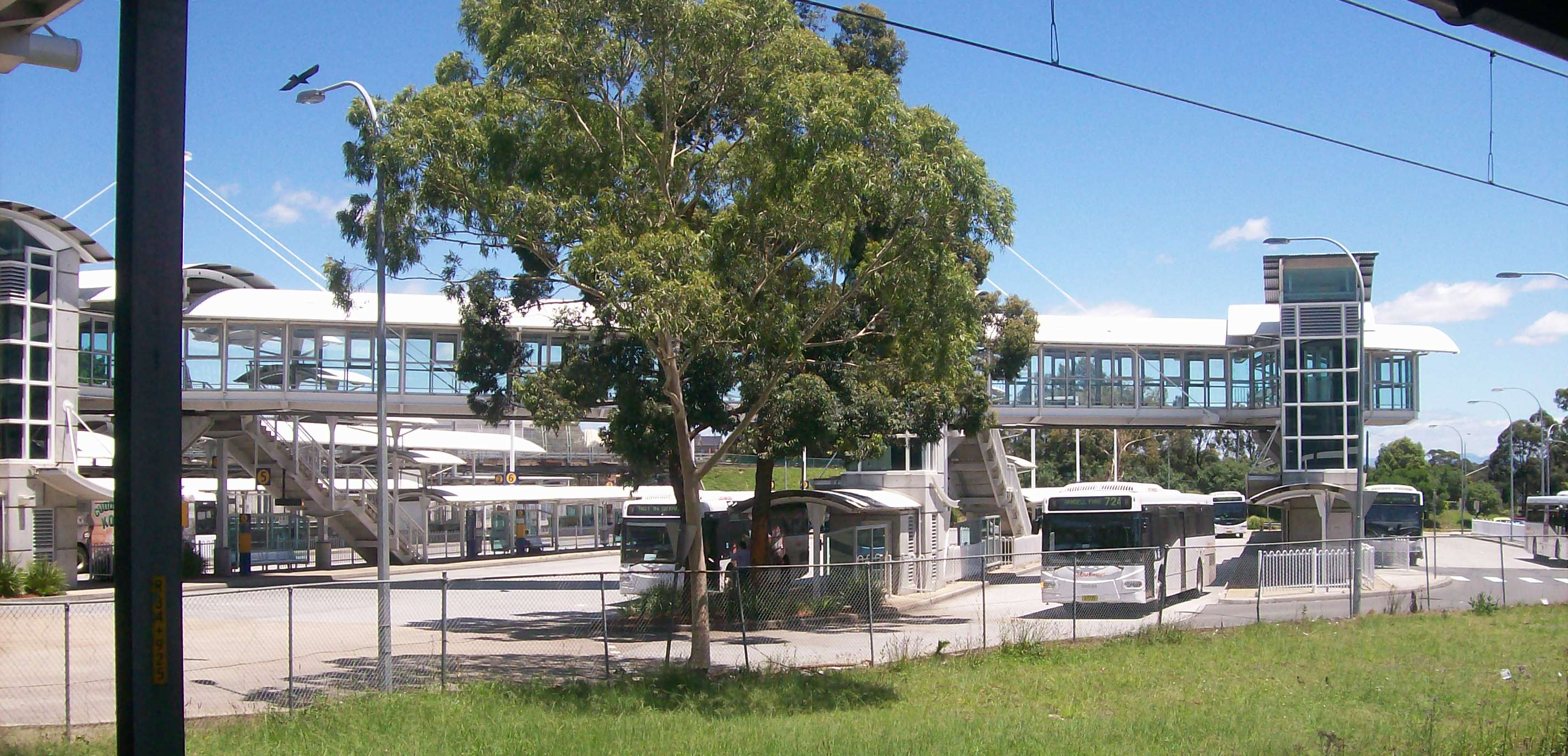
Bus interchange in November 2011

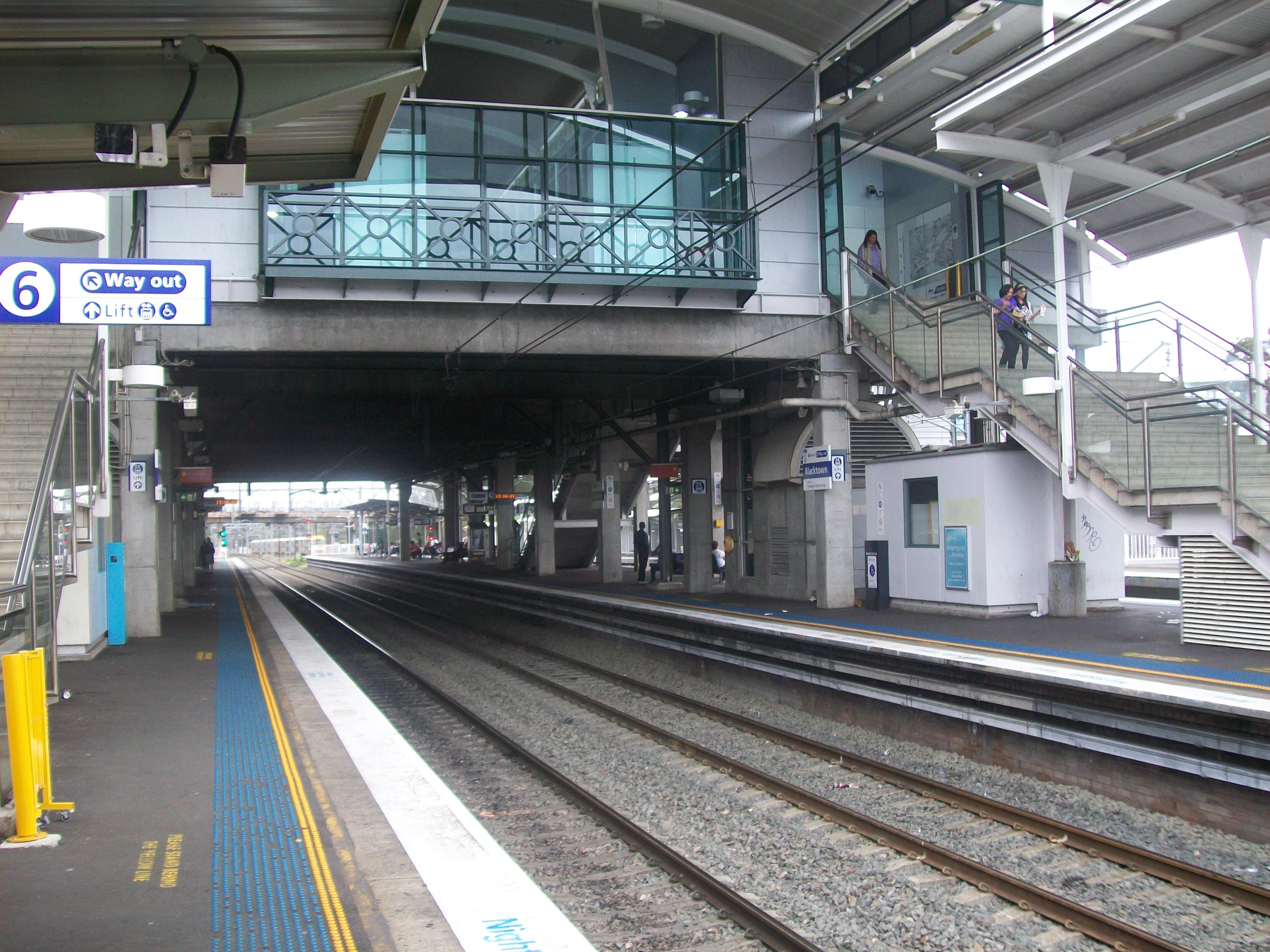
Platform 6 in January 2008

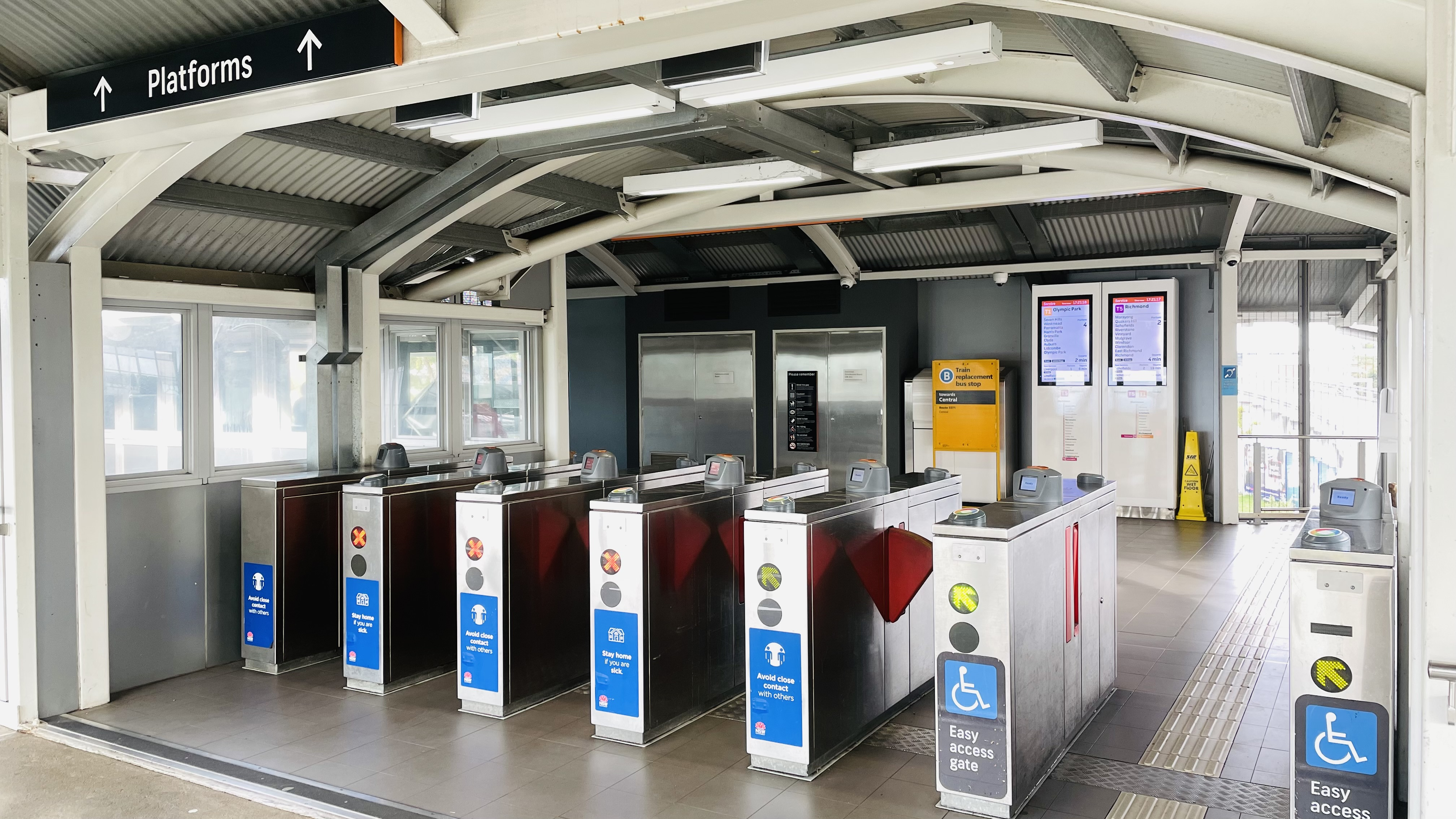
Ticket Barriers on Richmond branch concourse in October 2022

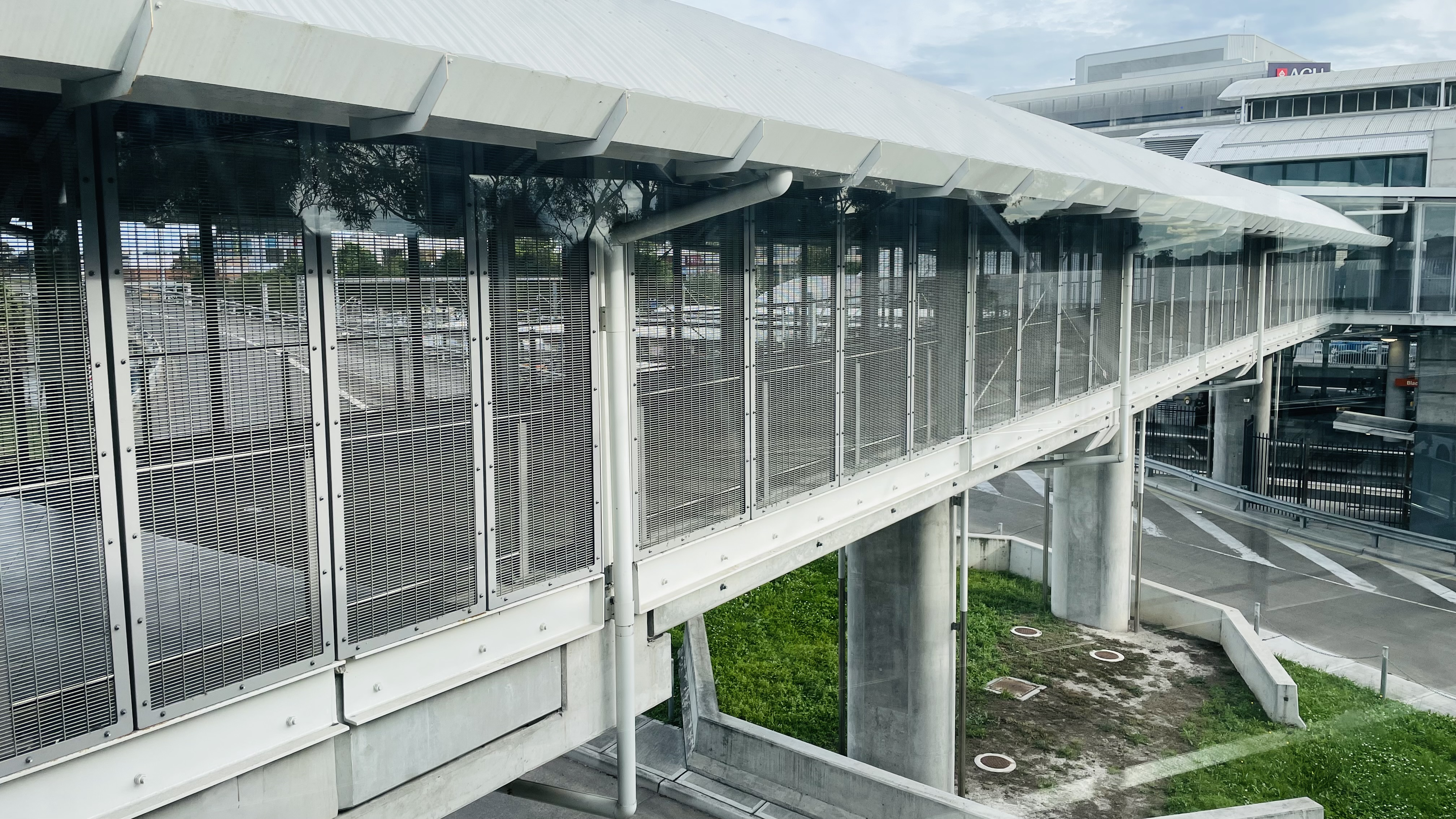
Pedestrian footbridge linking Richmond branch and Main concourse areas in October 2022

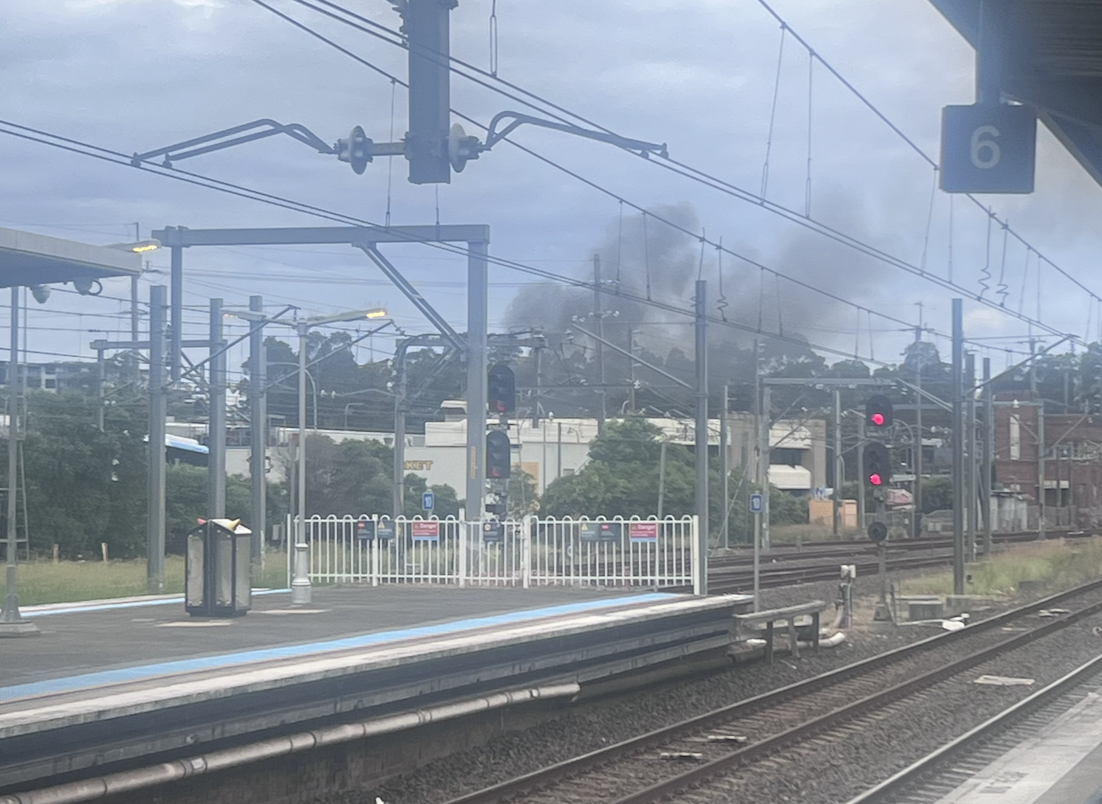
View towards Sydney from platform 6, with smoke from a possible fire
