= Berowra railway station =

Railway station in Sydney, New South Wales, Australia

Berowra
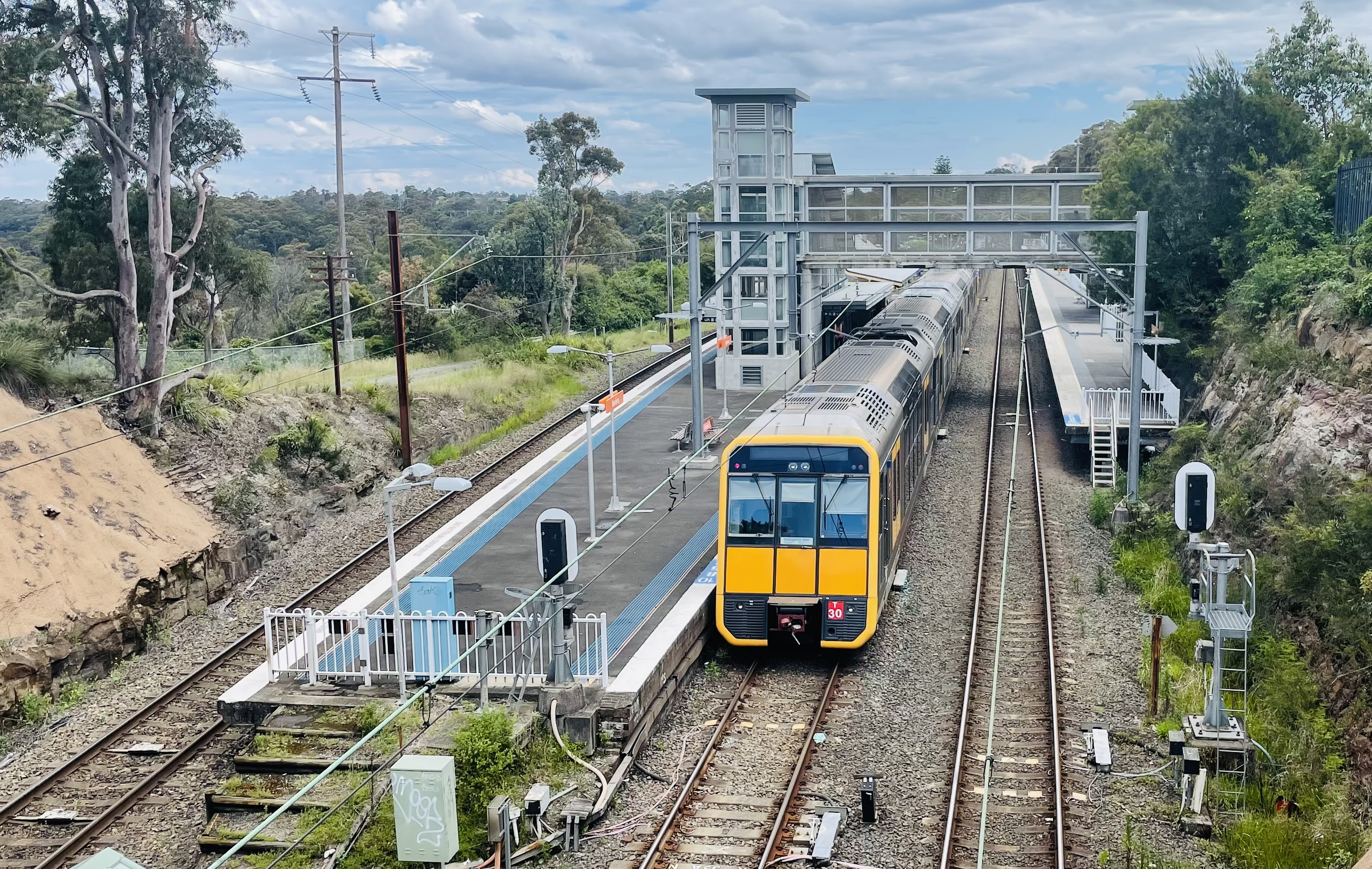
- Southbound view of station, with a Tangara on Platform 2, October 2022

General information
- Location: Old Pacific Highway, Berowra, New South Wales; Australia
- Coordinates: 33°37′25″S 151°09′11″E
- Elevation: 206 m (676 ft)
- Owner: Transport Asset Manager of New South Wales
- Operator: Sydney Trains
- Line: Main North
- Distance: 44.66 km (27.75 mi) from Central
- Platforms: 3 (1 island, 1 side)
- Tracks: 3
- Connections: Bus

Construction
- Structure type: Ground
- Accessible: Yes

Other information
- Status: Weekdays: Staffed: 6am–10pm: Weekends and public holidays: Staffed: 6am–10pm
- Station code: BEW
- Website: Transport for NSW

History
- Opened: 7 April 1887 (139 years ago)
- Electrified: Yes (January 1960)

Passengers
- 2025: 595,158 (year); 1,631 (daily) (Sydney Trains)
- Rank: 151

Services
Preceding station	Sydney Trains	Following station
Terminus	North Shore & Western Line	Mount Kuring-gai via Gordon towards City
Preceding station	Intercity Trains	Following station
Cowan towards Newcastle Interchange	Central Coast & Newcastle Line Limited services	Mount Kuring-gai towards Central
Cowan towards Newcastle Interchange	Central Coast & Newcastle Line Limited services	Asquith towards Central
Cowan towards Newcastle Interchange	Central Coast & Newcastle Line	Hornsby towards Central
Woy Woy towards Gosford	Central Coast & Newcastle Line Weekday peak via Gordon	Hornsby towards Central
Location

Berowra railway station is a suburban railway station located on the Main North line, serving the Sydney suburb of Berowra. It is served by Sydney Trains T1 North Shore Line services and intercity Central Coast & Newcastle Line services.

== History ==
Berowra station opened on 7 April 1887 when the Main Northern line was extended from Hornsby to Hawkesbury River. In 1909, the line was duplicated and the present island platform built.

On 23 October 1983, a passing loop was opened opposite the platform. This allowed suburban services to terminate, and from January 1992, Berowra became the northern boundary of the Sydney suburban network replacing Cowan.

On 28 August 2006, Platform 3 opened on the passing loop as part of the Rail Clearways Program, to allow suburban trains to terminate clear of the running lines. Trains now terminate on the middle Platform 2, allowing through trains to overtake any terminating trains standing in the station. The upgrade also included provision of lifts, a new over-rail bridge for general station access and additional wet weather protection.

On 22 January 2007, Berowra station was almost engulfed as bushfires swept the Ku-ring-gai Chase National Park. Efforts from firefighters saved the station and a train which had terminated there.

In February 2024, a man and woman were struck and killed by a freight train while attempting to cross the tracks at Berowra station. The incident was ruled an accident.

== Services ==
=== Platforms ===
Platform	Line	Stopping pattern	Notes
1	Central Coast & Newcastle Line	Services to Sydney Central via Strathfield	
1	Central Coast & Newcastle Line	6 Morning peak hour services to Sydney Central via Gordon	
2	North Shore & Western Line	Services to Penrith & Emu Plains via Gordon	Terminating services
3	Central Coast & Newcastle Line	Services to Gosford, Wyong & Newcastle	

=== Transport links ===
CDC NSW operates four bus routes via Berowra station, under contract to Transport for NSW:

Pacific Hwy:

- 592: Hornsby station to Mooney Mooney
- 593: to Mt Ku-ring-gai Industrial Estate (Beaumont Road)
- 597: to Hornsby station
- 599: to Berowra Heights

== Gallery ==
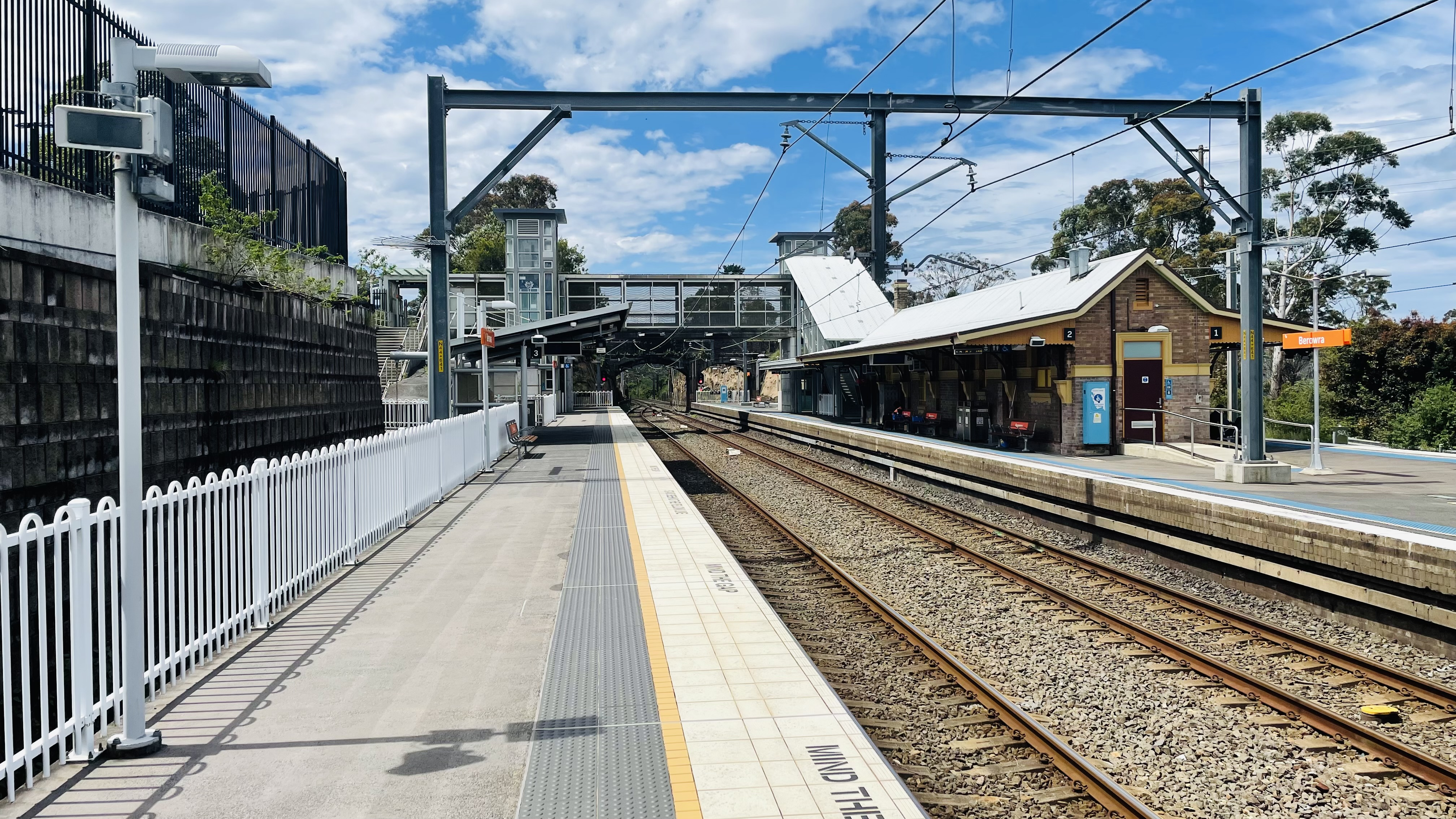
Northbound view from Platform 3 in October 2022

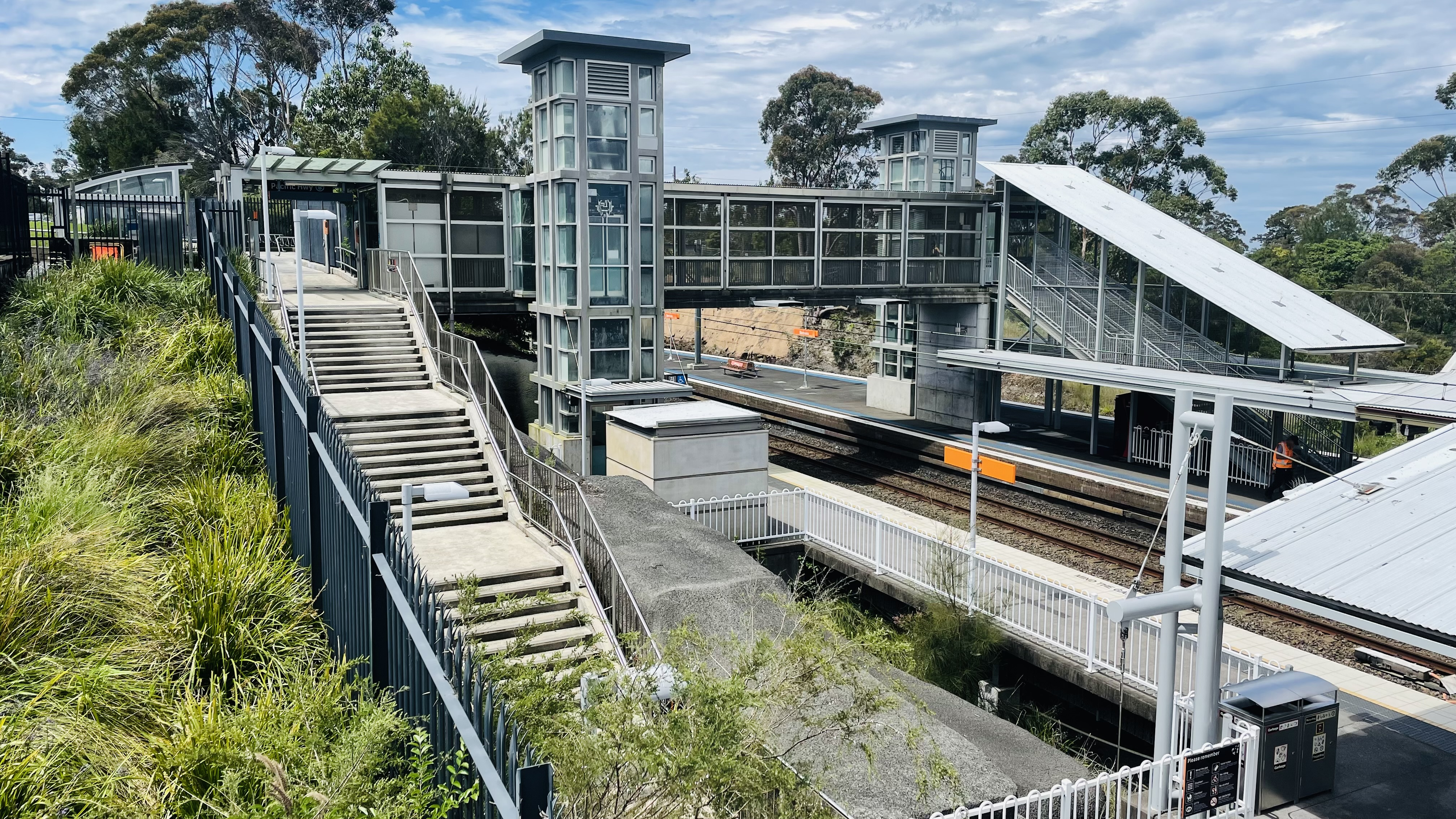
Exterior view of the concourse constructed in 2006, in October 2022
