= Lindfield railway station =

Railway station in Sydney, New South Wales, Australia

Lindfield
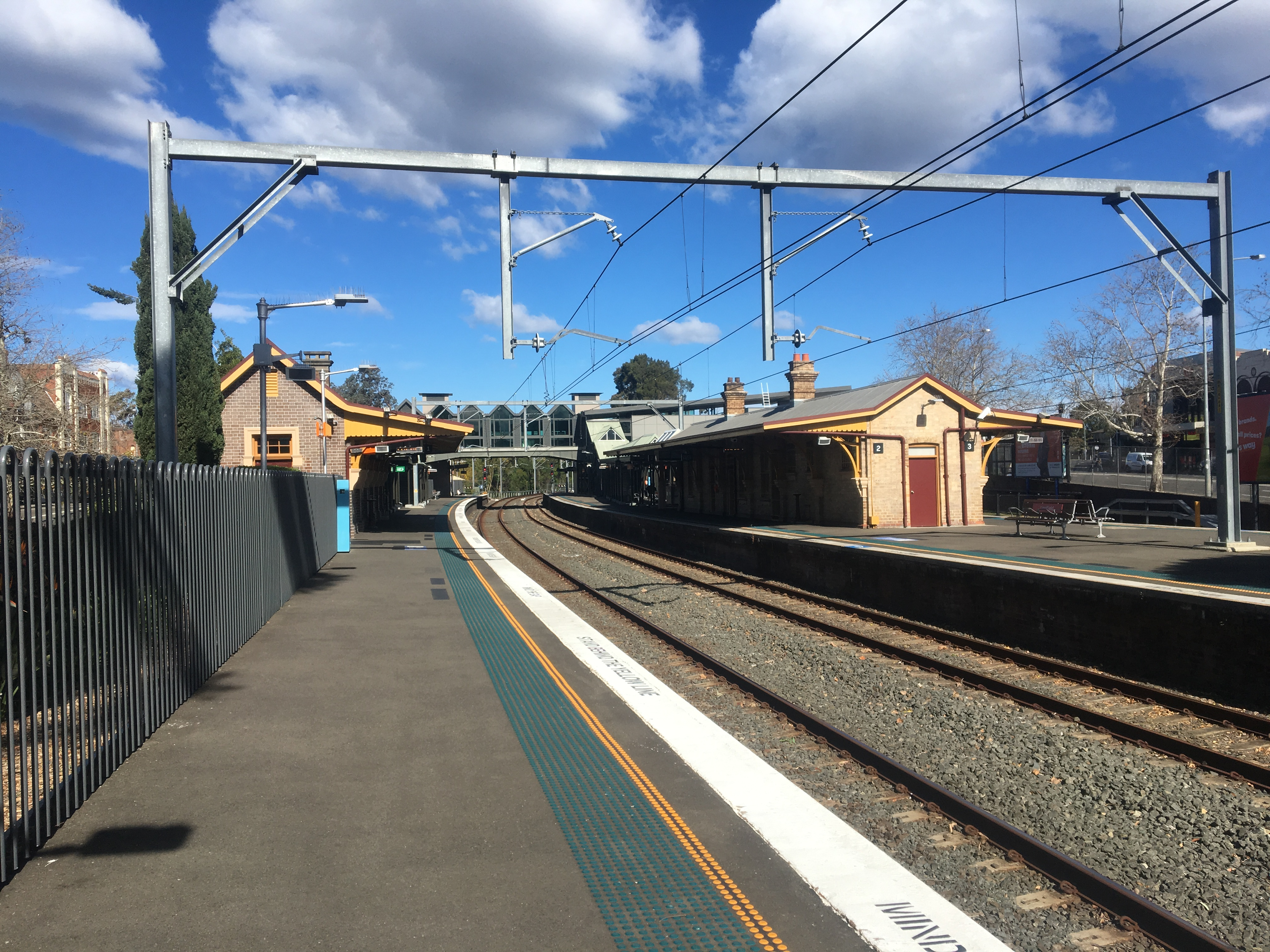
- Station platforms and buildings in August 2018

General information
- Location: Pacific Highway, Lindfield; New South Wales, Australia
- Coordinates: 33°46′30″S 151°10′08″E
- Elevation: 102 metres (335 ft)
- Owner: Transport Asset Manager of NSW
- Operator: Sydney Trains
- Line: North Shore
- Distance: 14.60 km (9.07 mi) from Central
- Platforms: 3 (1 side, 1 island)
- Tracks: 3
- Connections: Bus

Construction
- Structure type: Ground

Other information
- Status: Staffed
- Station code: LDD

History
- Opened: 1 January 1890 (136 years ago)
- Electrified: Yes; 1927

Passengers
- 2025: 2,044,122 (year); 5,600 (daily) (Sydney Trains)
- Rank: 76

Services
| Preceding station | Sydney Trains | Following station |
|---|---|---|
| Roseville towards Emu Plains or Richmond | North Shore & Western Line | Killara towards Berowra |
| Roseville via Strathfield towards Hornsby | Northern Line | Killara towards Gordon |
Location

Lindfield railway station is a suburban railway station located on the North Shore line, serving the Sydney suburb of Lindfield. It is served by Sydney Trains T1 North Shore & Western Line and T9 Northern Line services.

== History ==
Lindfield station opened on 1 January 1890 when the North Shore line opened from Hornsby to St Leonards. It was named after a house near the station, between Bent and Balfour Streets, was named "Lindfield" after the native town of Mr. List, the owner. Mr. William Cowan, first President of the Shire, afterwards lived there.

By 1900, the line south of Lindfield had been duplicated with the platform converted to an island platform, this was extended north in 1909. By 1922, a new side platform had been opened on the eastern side, with the middle platform becoming a terminating road.

The station was upgraded with a new concourse and lifts constructed in 2009.

== Services ==
=== Platforms ===
| Platform | Line | Stopping pattern | Notes |
| 1 | T1 | services to Penrith, Emu Plains & Richmond via Central | |
| 1 | T9 | services to Hornsby via Strathfield | |
| 2 | T1 | terminating services to/from Penrith & Richmond | |
| 3 | T1 | services to Gordon, Hornsby & Berowra | |
| 3 | T9 | services to Gordon | |

=== Transport Links ===
Lindfield Station is served by three bus routes operated by CDC NSW and one NightRide route.

== Gallery ==
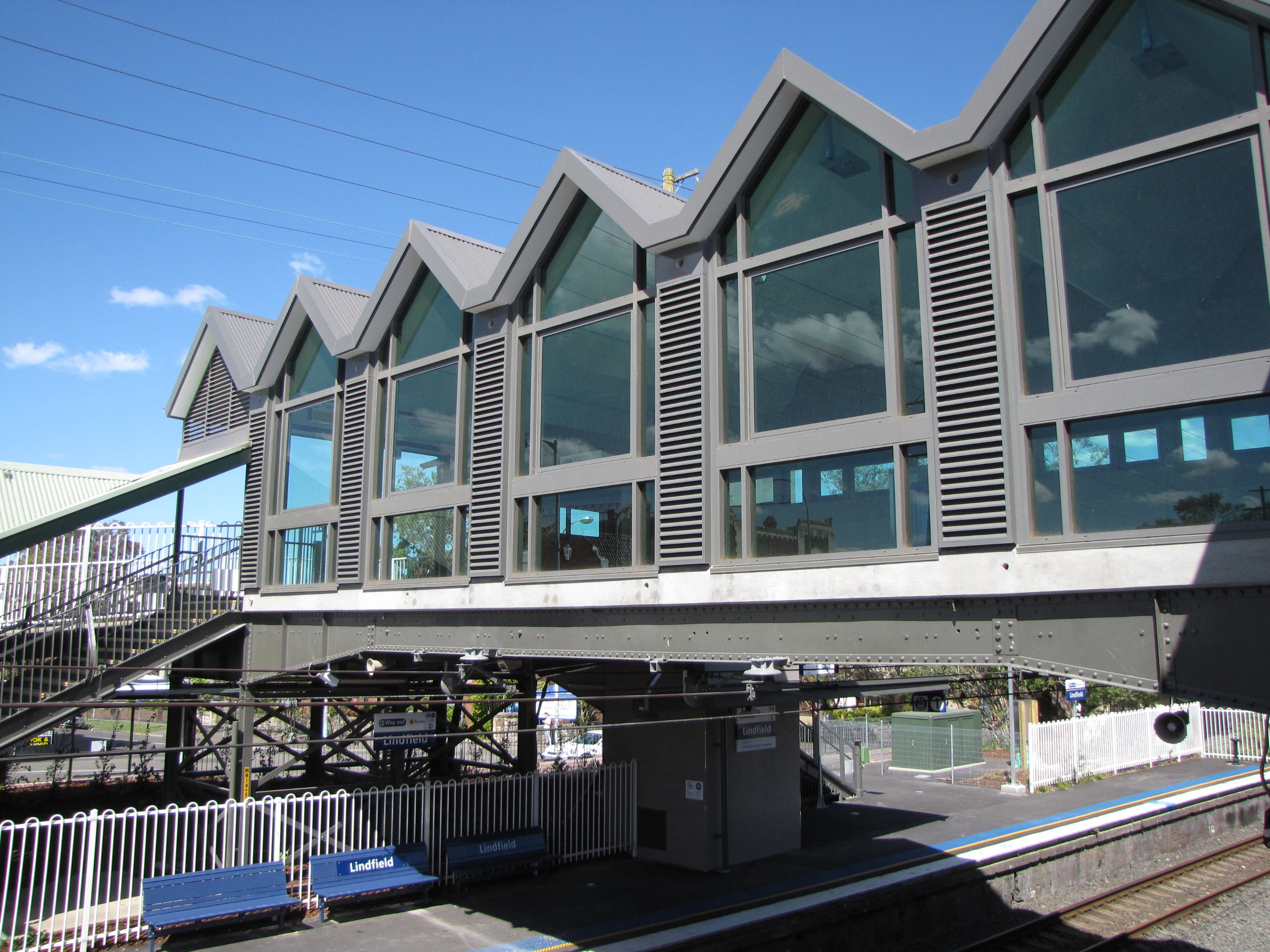
Station concourse in October 2009

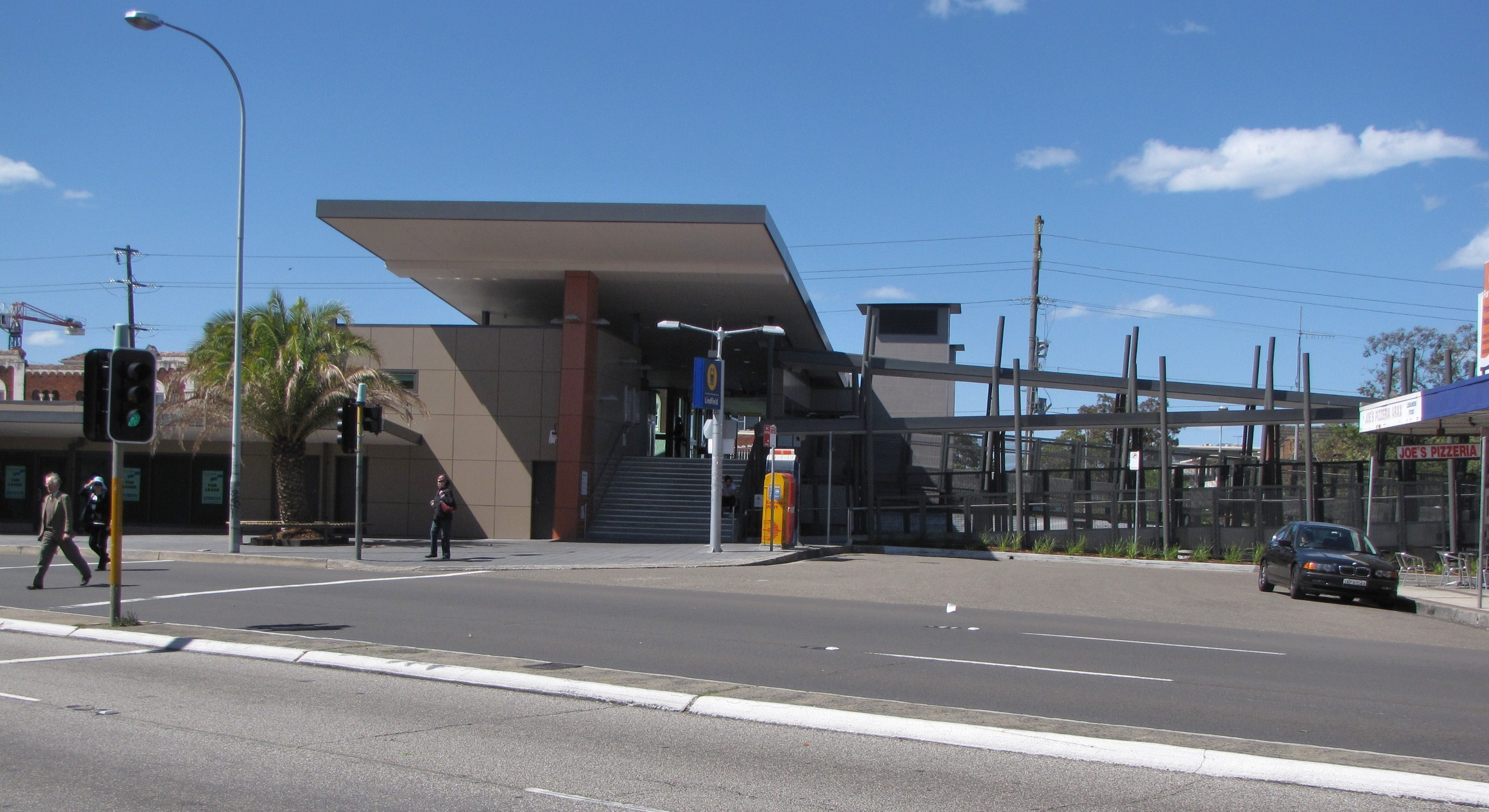
The main station entrance from the Pacific Highway in October 2009

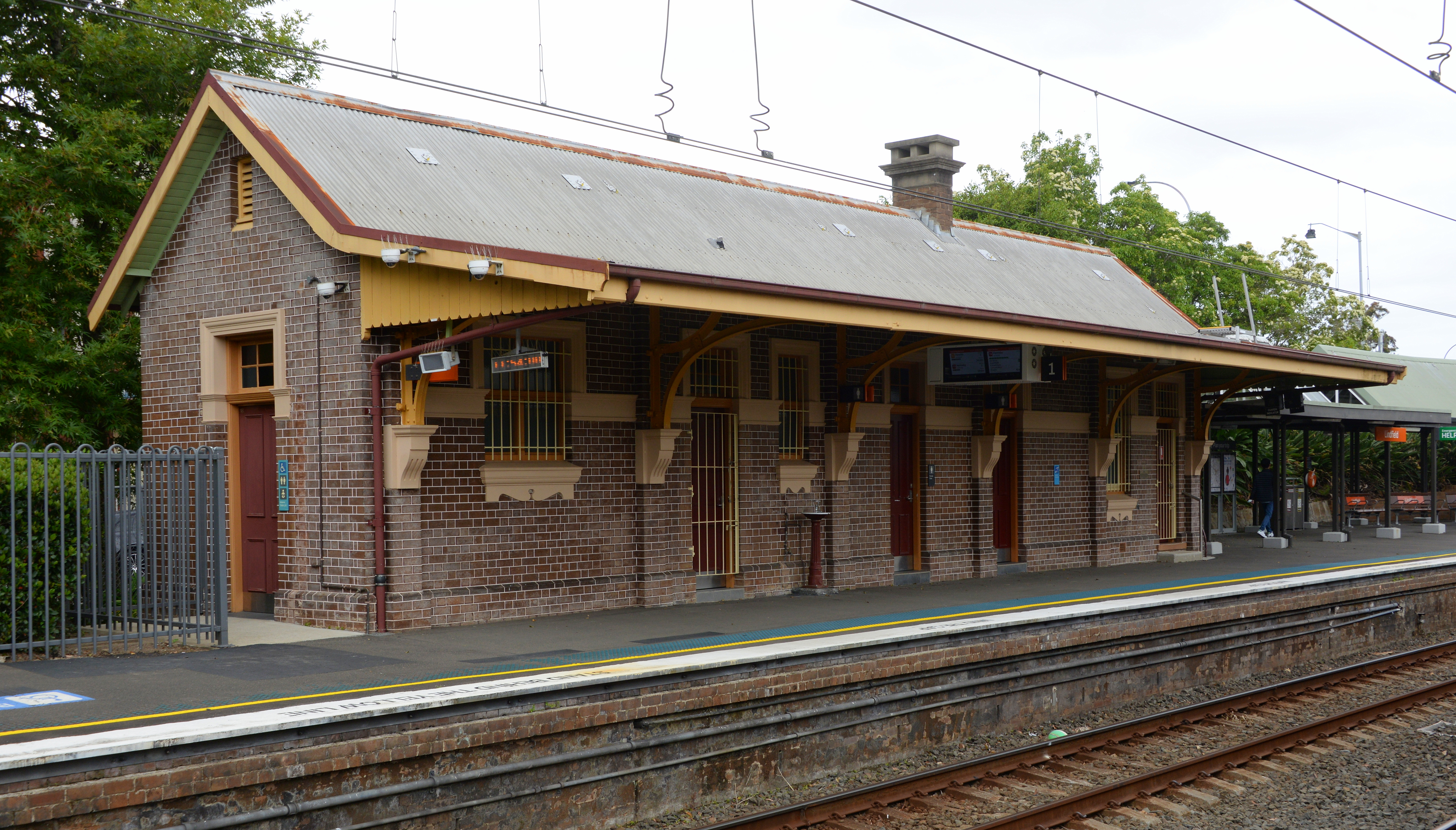
Looking towards the building on Platform 1 in November 2022
