= Killara railway station =

Railway station in Sydney, New South Wales, Australia

Killara
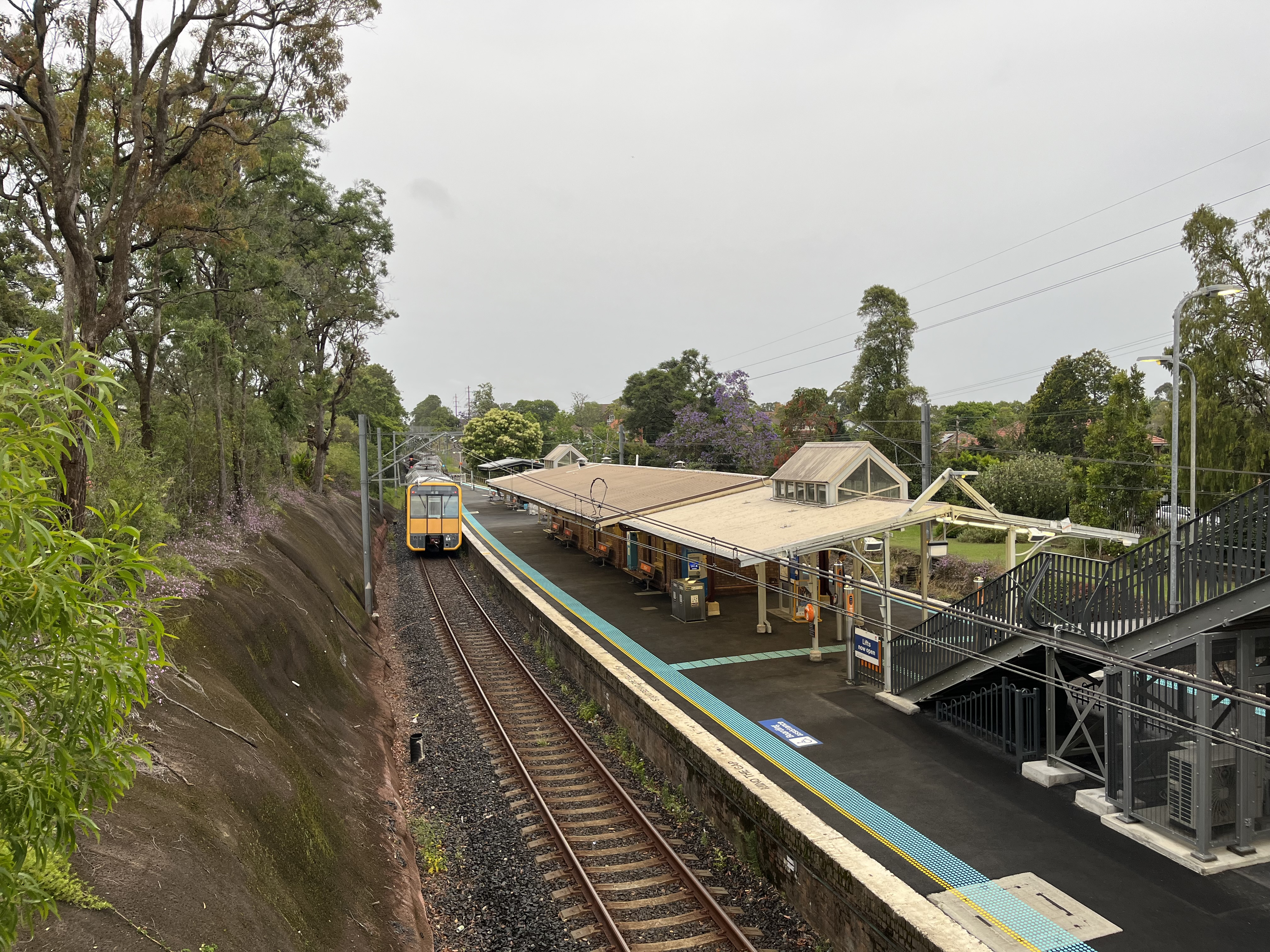
- Northbound view of station platform, building and stairs, November 2023

General information
- Location: Culworth Avenue, Killara; New South Wales, Australia
- Coordinates: 33°45′56″S 151°09′42″E
- Elevation: 116 metres (381 ft)
- Owner: New South Wales Government via Transport Asset Manager of New South Wales
- Operator: Sydney Trains
- Line: North Shore
- Distance: 15.89 km (9.87 mi) from Central
- Platforms: 2 (1 island)
- Tracks: 2
- Connections: Bus

Construction
- Structure type: Ground
- Accessible: Yes

Other information
- Status: Weekdays: Staffed: 6am to 7pm: Weekends and public holidays: Staffed: 8am to 4pm
- Station code: KLA
- Website: Transport for NSW

History
- Opened: 10 July 1899 (127 years ago)
- Rebuilt: 1906
- Electrified: Yes; 1927

Passengers
- 2025: 1,062,553 (year); 2,911 (daily) (Sydney Trains)
- Rank: 121

Services
Preceding station	Sydney Trains	Following station
Lindfield towards Emu Plains or Richmond	North Shore & Western Line	Gordon towards Berowra
Lindfield via Strathfield towards Hornsby	Northern Line	Gordon Terminus
Location

Killara railway station is a suburban railway station and garden located on the North Shore line, serving the Sydney suburb of Killara. It is served by Sydney Trains T1 North Shore & Western Line and T9 Northern Line services. Killara railway station has heritage significance at a local level and is set among expansive gardens, rare in the Sydney metropolitan railway network.

== History ==
Killara station opened on 10 July 1899. The name Killara was chosen by J. G Edwards and means “permanent, always here.” The present island platform and station building were completed in 1906 in anticipation of the line being doubled. This occurred in 1909.

An upgrade to the station, including three lifts and tactile indicators was completed in November 2023.

== Services ==
=== Platforms ===
Platform	Line	Stopping pattern	Notes
1	T1	services to Penrith, Richmond & Emu Plains	
1	T9	services to Epping & Hornsby via Strathfield	
2	T1	services to Gordon, Hornsby & Berowra	
2	T9	services to Gordon	

=== Transport links ===
Killara station is served indirectly by one NightRide route that stops on the Pacific Highway:

Pacific Hwy:

- N90: Hornsby station to Town Hall station
