= Pymble railway station =

Railway station in Sydney, New South Wales, Australia

Pymble
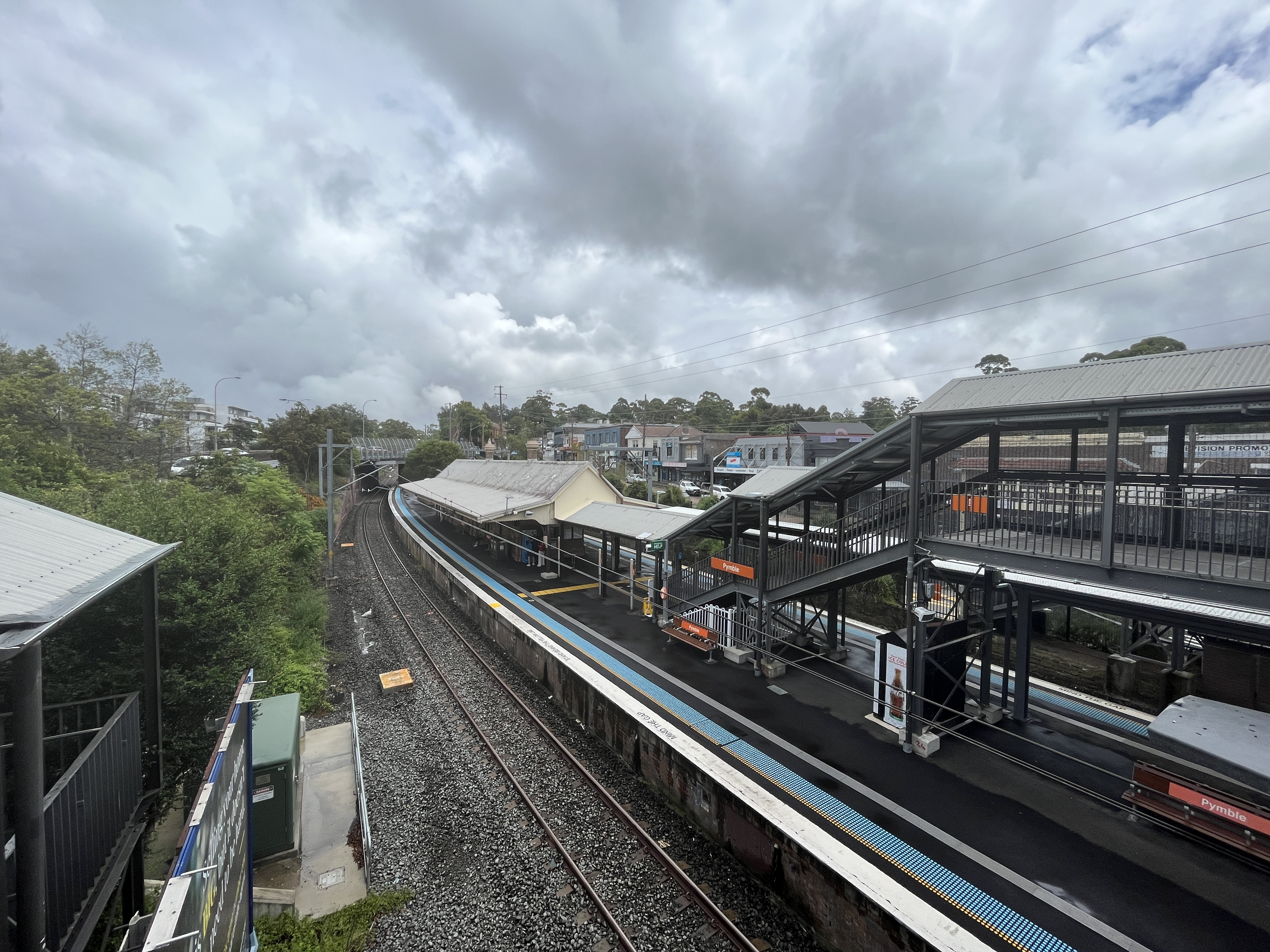
- Northbound view of platforms, stairs and buildings from footbridge in January 2024

General information
- Location: Grandview Street, Pymble, New South Wales, Australia
- Coordinates: 33°44′41″S 151°08′32″E
- Elevation: 140 metres (460 ft)
- Owner: Transport Asset Manager of NSW
- Operator: Sydney Trains
- Line: North Shore
- Distance: 18.90 km (11.74 mi) from Central
- Platforms: 2 (1 island)
- Tracks: 2
- Connections: Bus

Construction
- Structure type: Ground
- Accessible: Yes

Other information
- Status: Weekdays: Staffed: 6am to 7pm: Weekends and public holidays: Staffed: 8am to 4pm
- Station code: PYB

History
- Opened: 1 January 1890 (136 years ago)
- Electrified: Yes (from 1927)

Passengers
- 2025: 1,110,986 (year); 3,044 (daily) (Sydney Trains)
- Rank: 119

Services
| Preceding station | Sydney Trains | Following station |
|---|---|---|
| Gordon towards City | North Shore & Western Line | Turramurra towards Berowra |
Location

Pymble railway station is a suburban railway station located on the North Shore line, serving the Sydney suburb of Pymble. It is served by Sydney Trains T1 North Shore & Western Line services.

== History ==
Pymble station opened on 1 January 1890 when the North Shore line opened from Hornsby to St Leonards. The station was named after Robert Pymble who came from Herefordshire in 1821. He sold a part of his 600 acre estate which was granted to him in 1823 for capturing a bushranger which was built by convicts. When the line was opened, the kitchen of his old homestead was used as the ticket office, and the dining room as the waiting room. In those days, hurricane lamps were left at the station in the morning to light travellers home at night. The cottage of one of Pymble's sons, James (a bachelor), was removed to make way for the railway, and was afterwards the home of a sergeant of police who was shot by an orchardist on 1 May 1913.

The present island platform and station building were completed in 1909 in when the line was duplicated. In March 2021, plans to improve the accessibility of the station were approved. The upgrade featured three lifts, footpath upgrades, new handrails, and other features. The upgrade was completed in 2023.

== Services ==
=== Platforms ===
| Platform | Line | Stopping pattern | Notes |
| 1 | North Shore & Western Line | services to Hornsby via Strathfield, Richmond, Penrith & Emu Plains | |
| 2 | North Shore & Western Line | services to Hornsby & Berowra | |

=== Transport links ===
CDC NSW operates two bus route via Pymble station, under contract to Transport for NSW:

Grandview St:

- 579: to East Turramurra

Pacific Hwy:

- 575: to Macquarie University

Pymble station is served by one NightRide route:

- N90: Hornsby station to Town Hall station
