= Chatswood railway station =

Railway station in Sydney, New South Wales, Australia

Chatswood
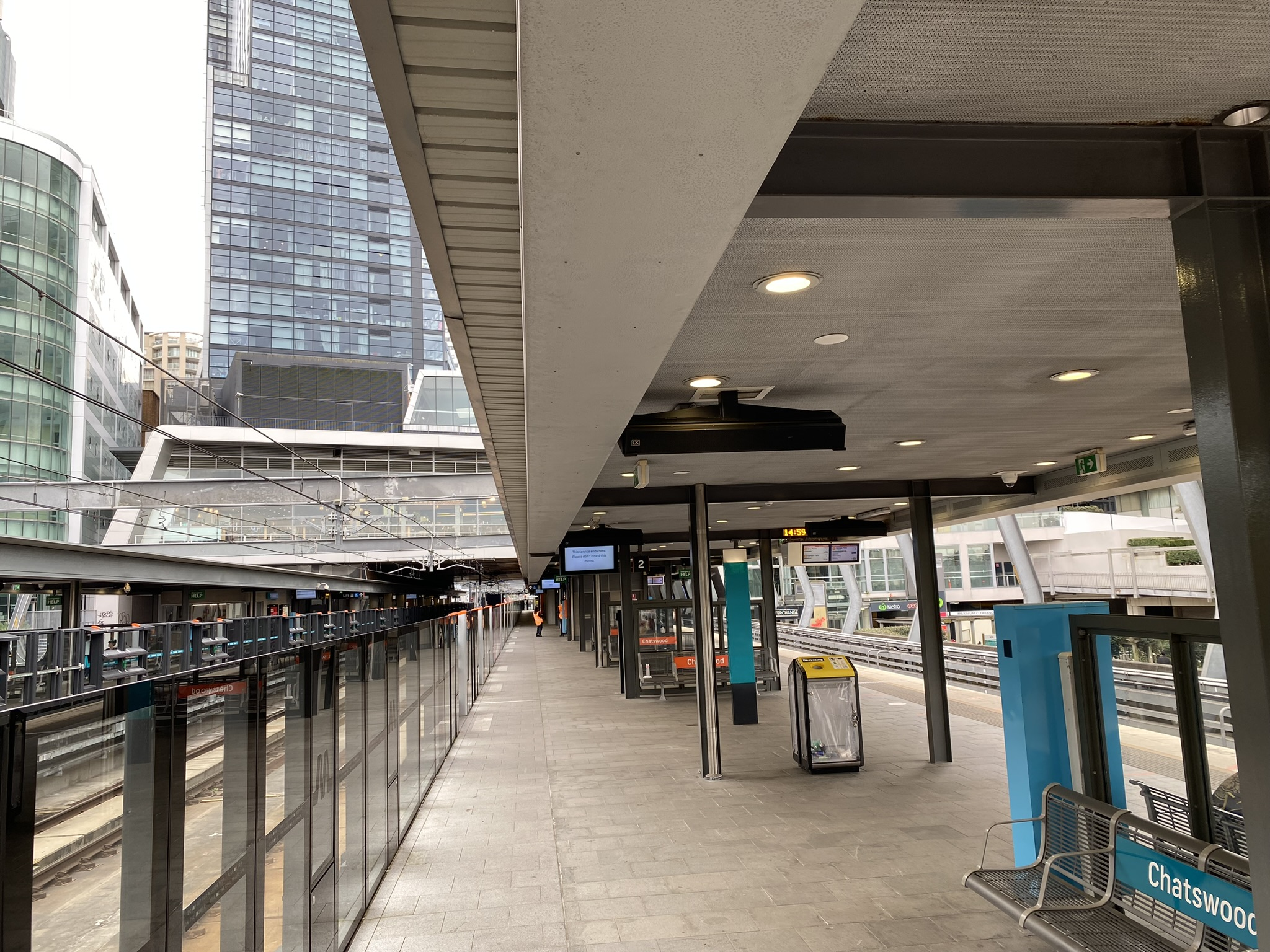
- Northbound view from Platform 2 in August 2024

General information
- Location: Railway Street, Chatswood, New South Wales, Australia
- Coordinates: 33°47′50″S 151°10′51″E
- Elevation: 108 metres (354 ft)
- Owner: Transport Asset Manager of NSW
- Operator: Sydney Trains; Metro Trains Sydney
- Lines: North Shore; Metro North West & Bankstown
- Distance: 11.65 km (7.24 mi) from Central
- Platforms: 4 (2 island)
- Tracks: 4
- Connections: Bus

Construction
- Structure type: Elevated
- Accessible: Yes

Other information
- Status: Staffed
- Station code: CWD
- Website: Transport for NSW

History
- Opened: 1 January 1890 (136 years ago)
- Rebuilt: 2006–08
- Electrified: Yes (from August 1927)

Passengers
- 2025: 19,973,745 (year); 54,723 (daily) (Sydney Trains, Sydney Metro)
- Rank: 6

Services
Preceding station	Sydney Metro	Following station
North Ryde towards Tallawong	M1 Metro North West & Bankstown Line	Crows Nest towards Bankstown
Preceding station	Sydney Trains	Following station
Artarmon towards Emu Plains or Richmond	T1 North Shore & Western Line	Roseville towards Berowra
Artarmon via Strathfield towards Hornsby	T9 Northern Line Hornsby via Strathfield	Roseville towards Gordon
Preceding station	Intercity Trains	Following station
Artarmon towards Central	Central Coast & Newcastle Line Weekday peak hour services	Gordon towards Gosford or Wyong
Former services
Preceding station	Sydney Trains	Following station
Artarmon towards Emu Plains or Richmond	T1 North Shore & Western Line Hornsby via Epping (2009–2018)	North Ryde towards Hornsby
Location

Chatswood railway station is a rapid transit and suburban railway station located in the Sydney suburb of Chatswood. It is served by Sydney Trains T1 North Shore & Western Line and T9 Northern Line services and intercity Central Coast & Newcastle Line services, as well as Sydney Metro North West & Bankstown Line services.

== History ==
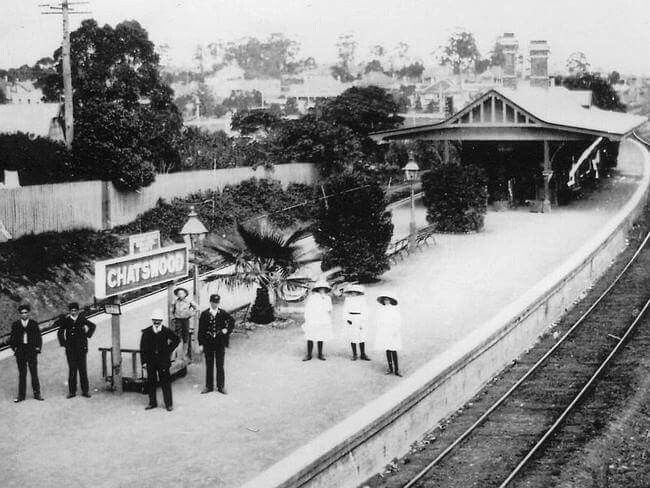
The original station building and platform, 1916

Chatswood station opened on 1 January 1890 when the North Shore line opened from Hornsby to St Leonards. An island platform was built on 23 May 1900 and a third dock platform brought into use on 12 July 1919. There was a small goods yard, similar to the one at St Leonards, on the western side of the station, beyond the northern end of the platforms. The dock platform on the eastern side of the station was used for electric parcel-van traffic and also for terminating some services from the city, until these were rescheduled to terminate further along the North Shore line from January 1992. It was removed in October 1994. Until 1958 there was a tram terminus in Victoria Avenue beside the station. The station entrance was later integrated with a shopping centre called The Interchange in 1988.

With the construction of the Chatswood to Epping line, it was decided to redevelop the station to accommodate Chatswood's new role as a junction station. The original platform 1 was fenced off by early 2005, while the rest of the original platforms (2 & 3), as well as the attached bus interchange and shopping centre were demolished later in that year.

A new temporary eastern island platform was opened where the original platform 1 was located. Construction was under way on the current western island platform, opened in place of the original island platform on 16 October 2006, in which the temporary platform was demolished to make way for the current eastern island platform. The current western platforms were initially numbered 1 and 2, until they were renumbered to 3 and 4 when the current eastern platforms opened in 2008. City bound trains moved to the eastern platforms (Platform 1) from the renumbered Platform 3. The signal cabin that was located at the northern end of the original station building, was saved and preserved as part of the new bus interchange, near Stand A. The Epping to Chatswood rail link then opened on 23 February 2009.

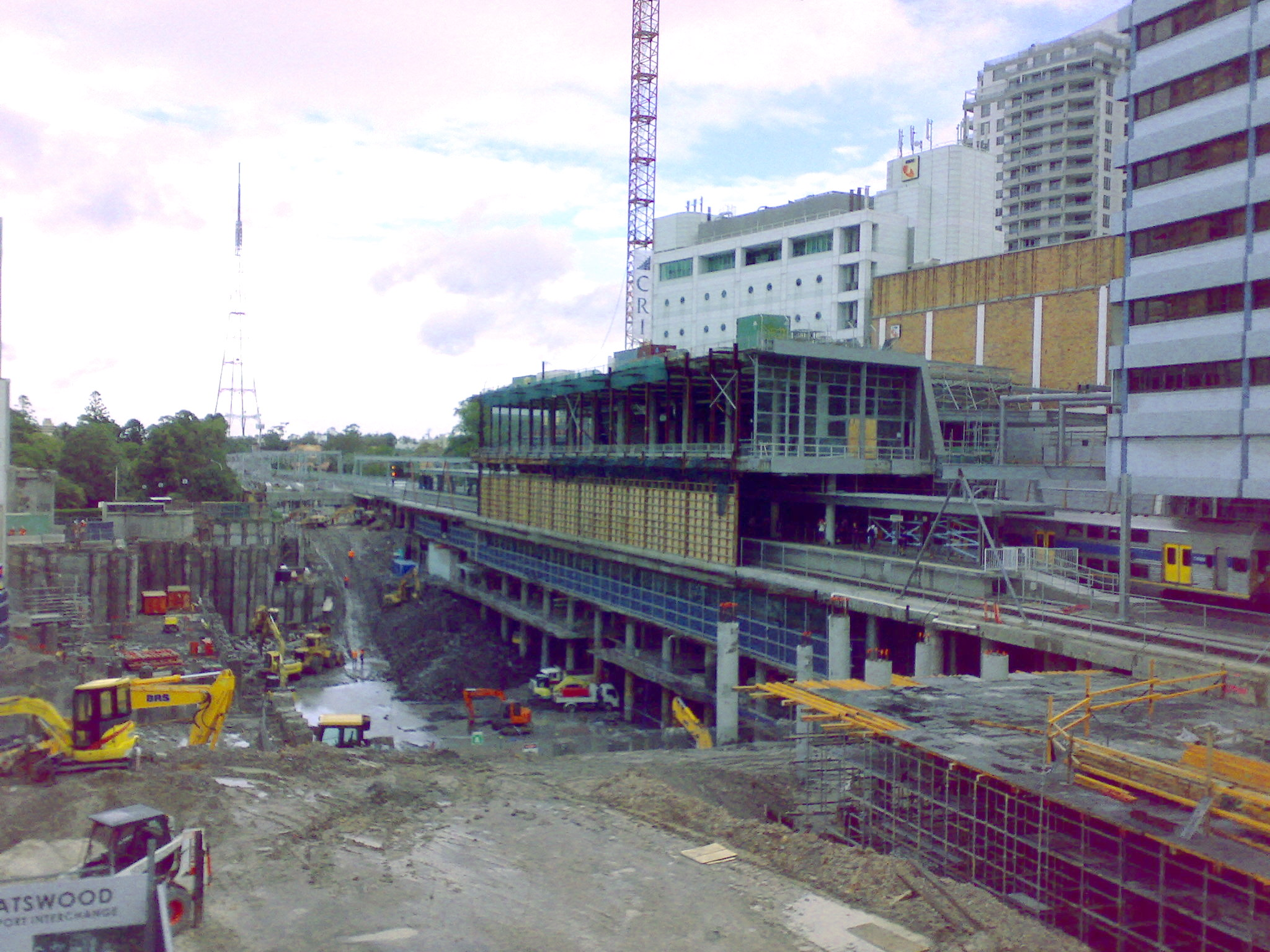
Construction on the new station in April 2007

The new station precinct is known as the Chatswood Transport Interchange (CTI) and consists of the railway station, a bus interchange and pedestrian pathways connecting the precinct to the surrounding streets. The CTI was constructed as a Public Private Partnership and was to include a new shopping plaza called Metro Chatswood and three towers. The private developers, CRI Chatswood, went into receivership whilst construction was underway. As a result, the shopping centre remained closed until 2014 and major construction of the towers was delayed for several years.

On 29 September 2018, the Epping to Chatswood rail link was closed for the line's conversion to metro standards. The line reopened on 26 May 2019, as part of the new Metro North West Line, where Chatswood became the major terminus of the new line.

On 19 August 2024, the Metro North West Line was extended from Chatswood to Sydenham as part of the Sydney Metro City & Southwest project, via the Sydney Harbour Rail Tunnel. This leaves Platforms 1 and 4 the only platforms served by Sydney Trains, with Metro services serving Platforms 2 and 3.

On 30 October 2026, the Metro North West & Bankstown Line was extended to Bankstown, finally completing the line in its entirety.

== Station layout ==
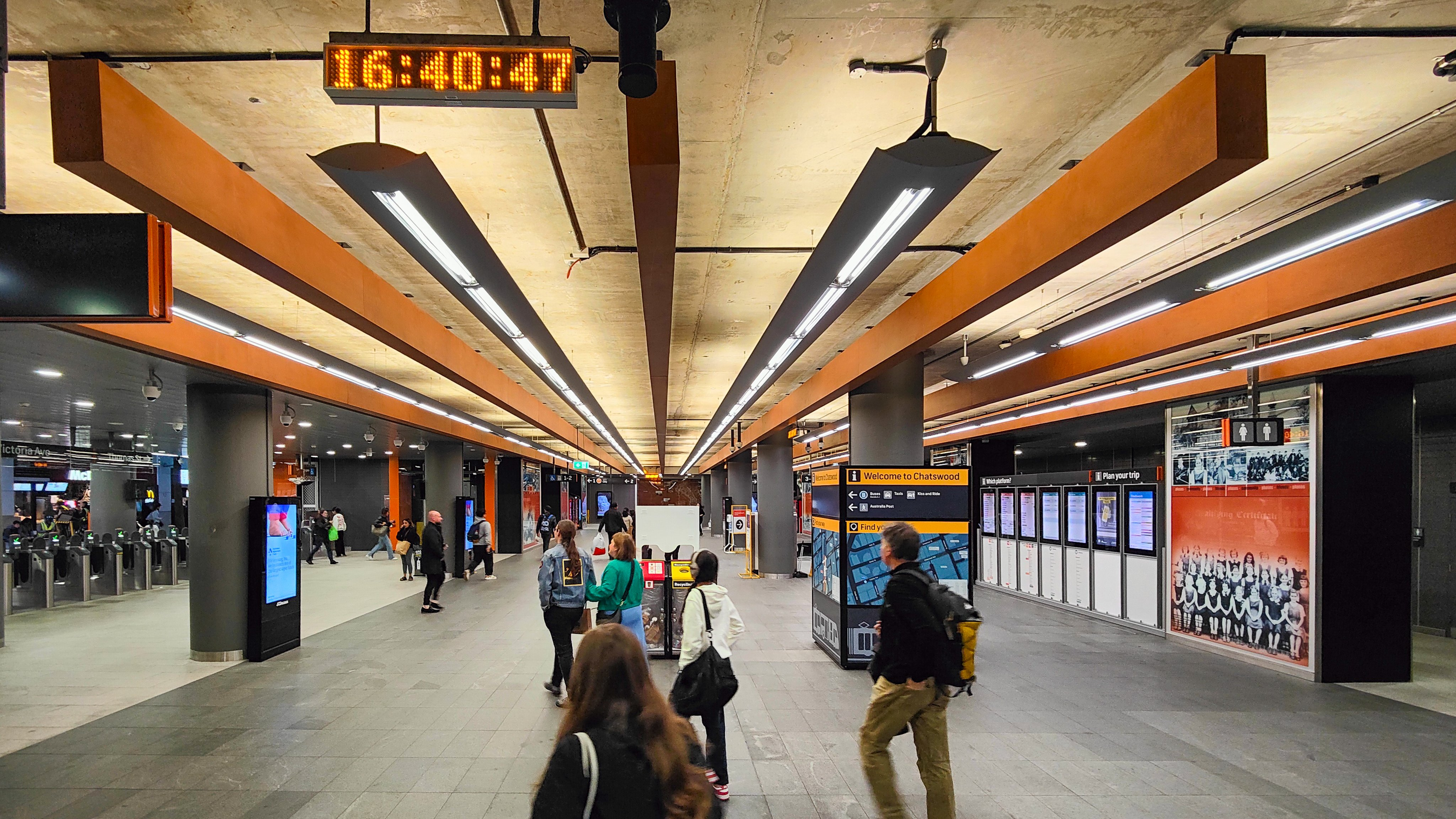
Ticket barriers + concourse, 2024

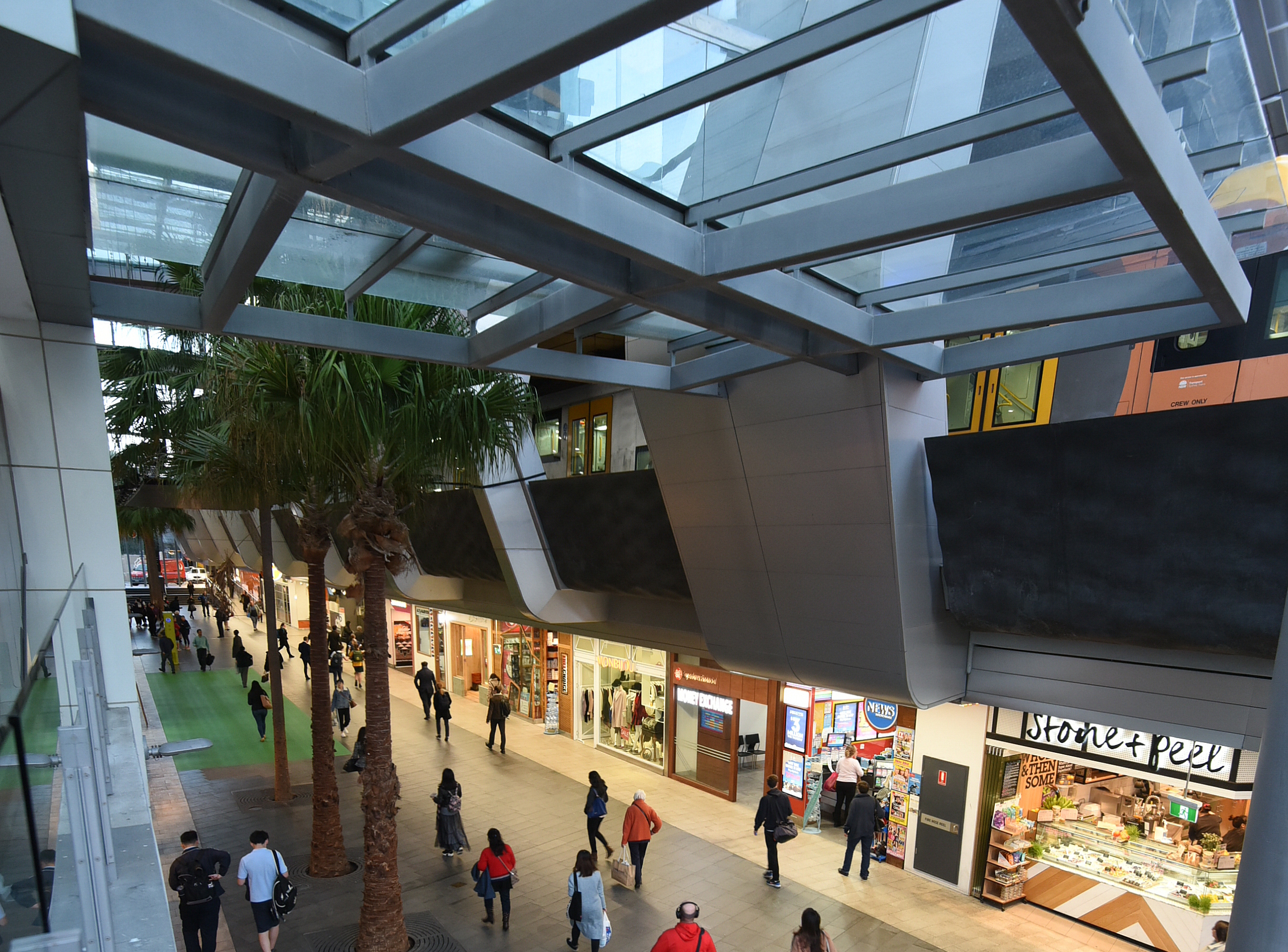
Retail and concourse, June 2018

The station consists of two island platforms – a city-bound platform and an outbound platform. The two centre platforms now serve as the terminus of the Sydney Metro Northwest line. The outer platforms serve the Northern and North Shore lines. A turnback / stabling road is located to the south of the station and is used to terminate some trains from the Sydney Metro.

Access to Chatswood station is provided by a series of pedestrian walkways at three different intersections: Victoria Avenue and Railway Street, Chatswood Mall and Orchard Road, and Post Office Lane and Victor Street. Additional pedestrian entrances are available from Chatswood Central Plaza, adjacent to the north side of the station concourse.

Because the station and tracks are level with the ground, the concourse is actually below street level despite being open-air in nature. The installation of new "jump-proof" opal card ticket barriers in 2018 reduces fare evasion and ensures faster entry into the concourse which features stairs, lifts, and escalators to access the platforms. The station fulfills Sydney Trains' Easy Access criteria.

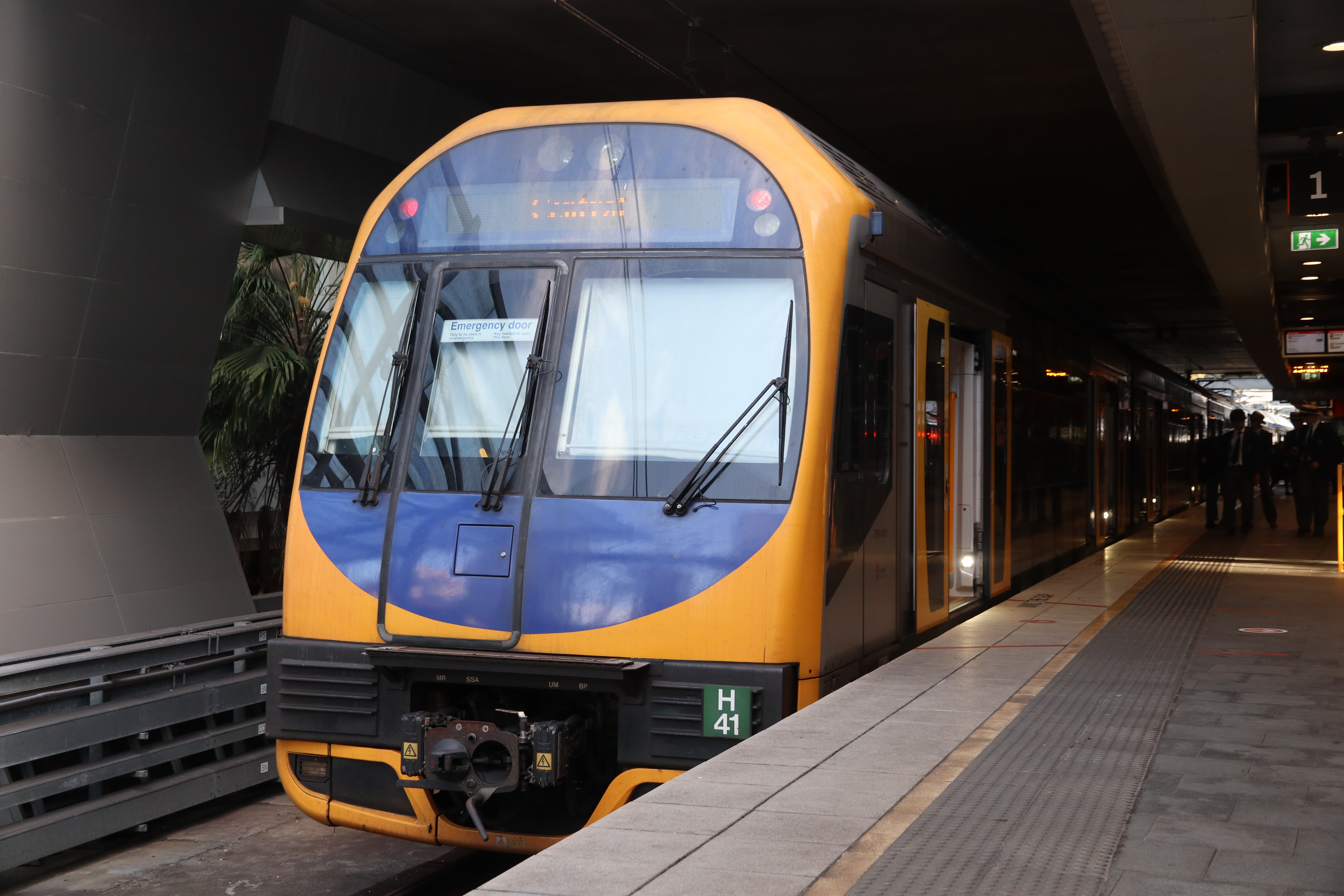
An H Set at Platform 1, September 2022

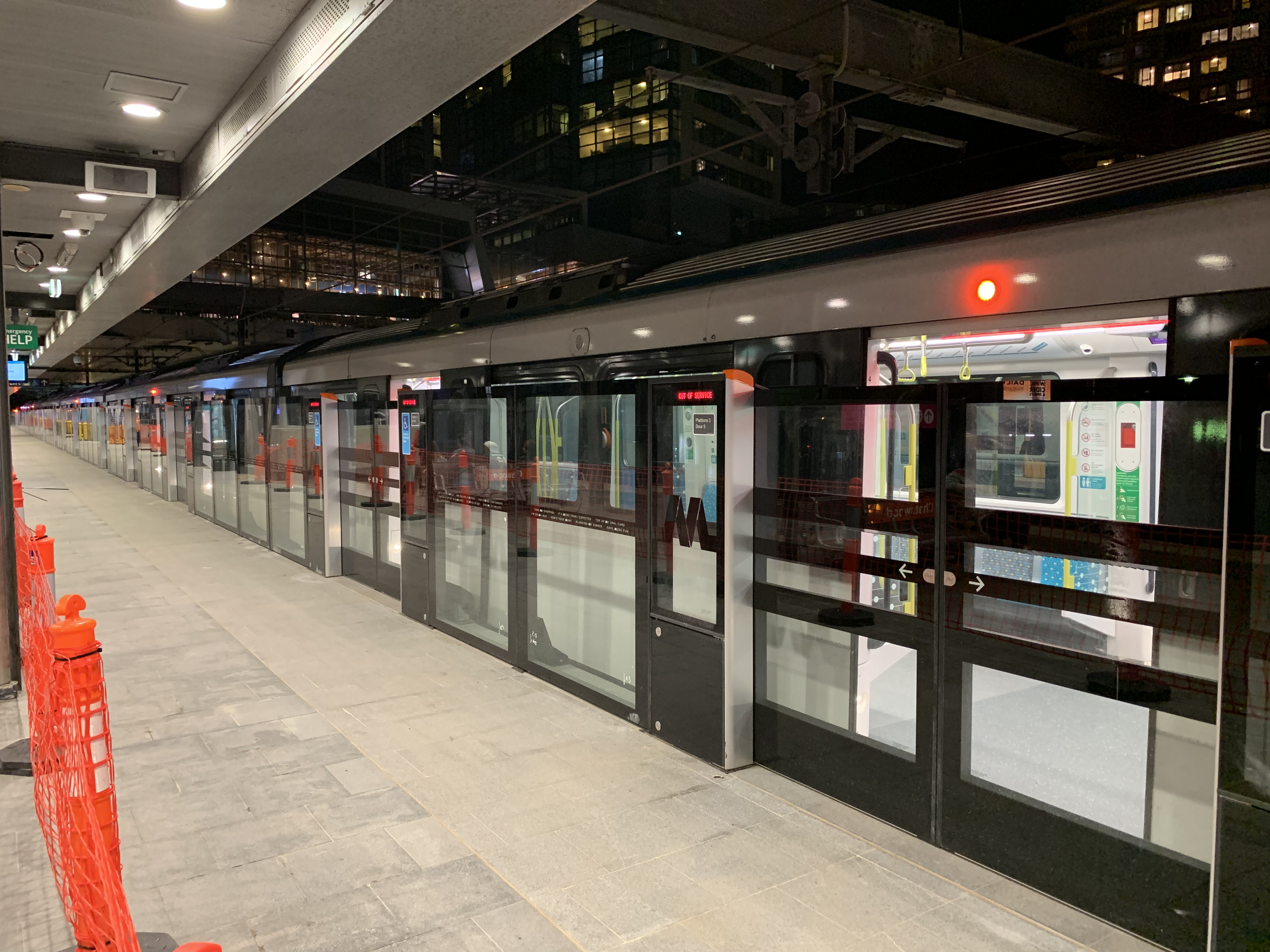
Sydney Metro platforms (2 & 3), April 2019

== Services ==
=== Platforms ===
Platform	Line	Stopping pattern	Notes
1	T1 North Shore & Western Line	Services to Central, Strathfield & towards Penrith, Emu Plains & Richmond	
1	T9 Northern Line	Services to Central, Strathfield & towards Hornsby via Epping	
1	Central Coast & Newcastle Line	6 Morning peak hour services to Sydney Central	
2	M1 Metro North West & Bankstown Line	Services to Bankstown	
3	M1 Metro North West & Bankstown Line	Services to Tallawong	
4	T1 North Shore & Western Line	Services to Lindfield, Gordon, Hornsby & Berowra	
4	Central Coast & Newcastle Line	6 Evening peak hour services to Gosford & Wyong via Gordon & Hornsby	

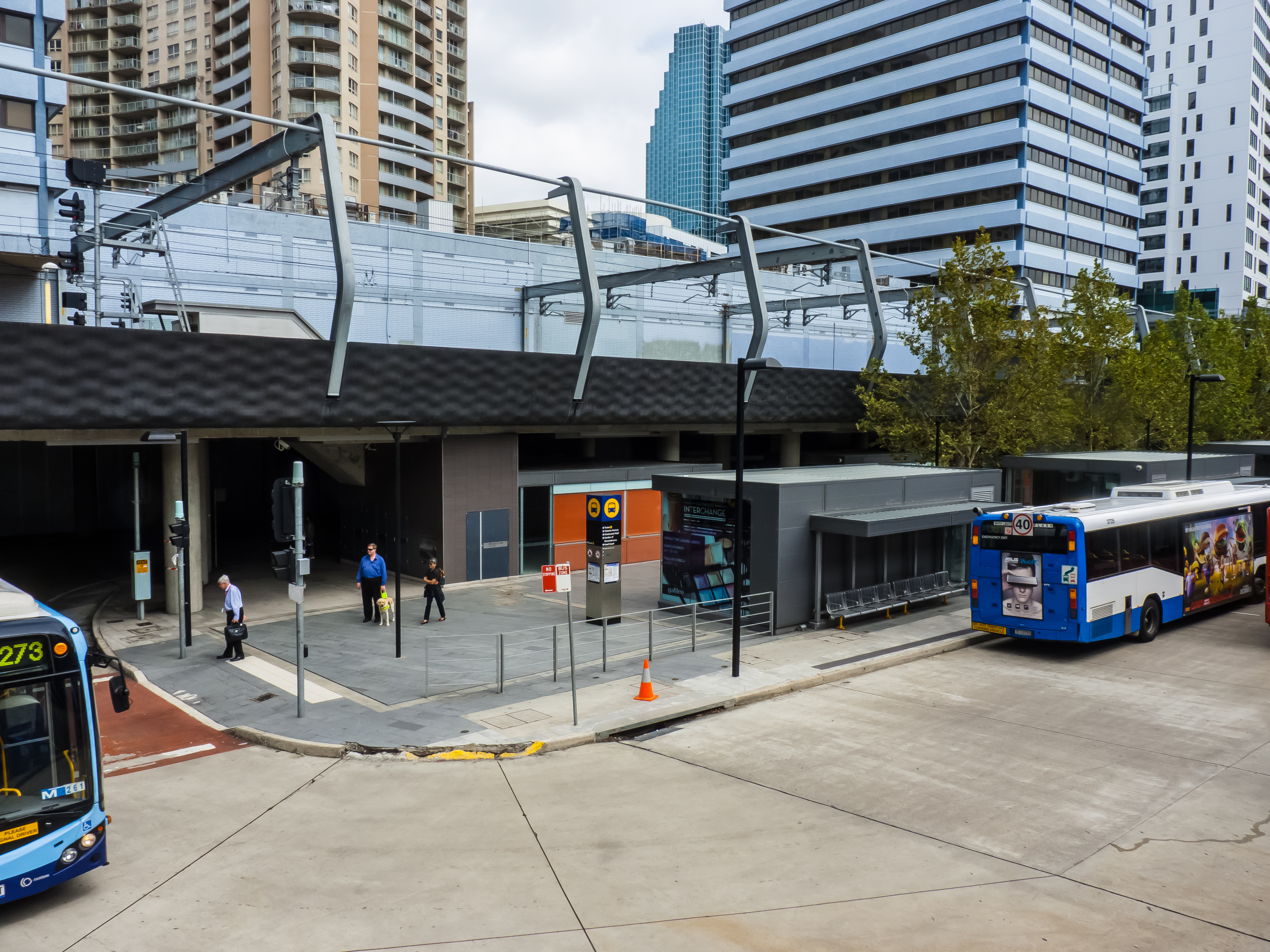
Bus interchange, January 2014

=== Transport links ===
Chatswood station is served by bus routes operated by Busways, CDC NSW, Keolis Downer Northern Beaches, Transit Systems and two NightRide routes.

External image
- Chatswood Bus Guide (as of March 2025) by Transport for NSW
