= Gordon railway station, Sydney =

Railway station in Sydney, New South Wales, Australia

Gordon
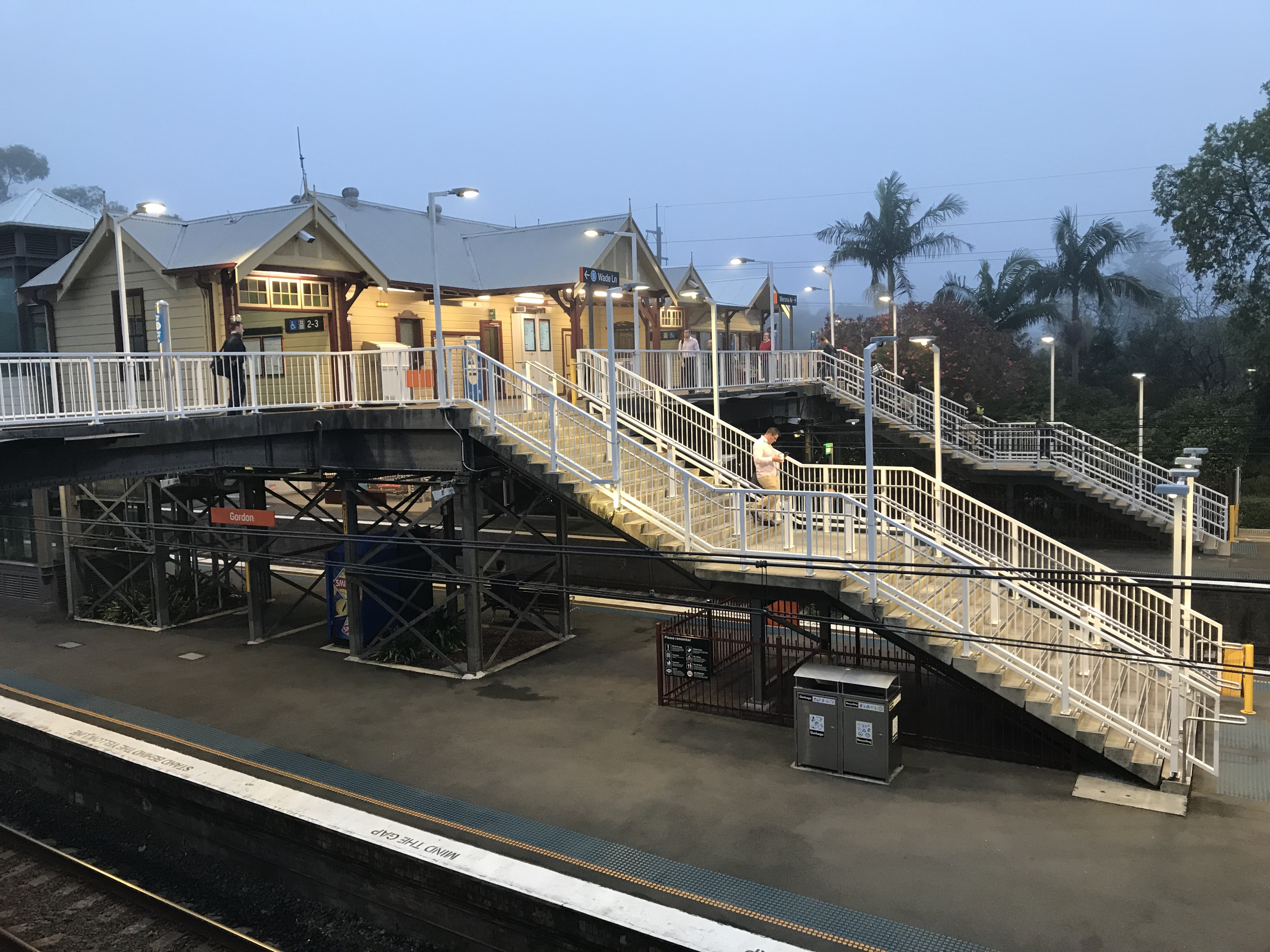
- Station platforms, building and footbridge, April 2018

General information
- Location: St Johns Avenue, Gordon, New South Wales, Australia
- Coordinates: 33°45′22″S 151°09′16″E
- Elevation: 122 metres (400 ft)
- Owner: New South Wales Government via Transport Asset Manager of New South Wales
- Operator: Sydney Trains
- Line: North Shore
- Distance: 17.12 km (10.64 mi) from Central
- Platforms: 3 (1 side, 1 island)
- Tracks: 3
- Connections: Bus

Construction
- Structure type: Ground
- Parking: 550 spaces
- Accessible: Yes

Other information
- Status: Staffed
- Station code: GDO
- Website: transportnsw.info/stop?q=10101121#/

History
- Opened: 1 January 1890 (136 years ago)
- Electrified: Yes (1927)

Passengers
- 2025: 3,518,572 (year); 9,640 (daily) (Sydney Trains)
- Rank: 47

Services
Preceding station	Sydney Trains	Following station
Killara towards Emu Plains or Richmond	North Shore & Western Line	Pymble towards Berowra
Killara via Strathfield towards Hornsby	Northern Line	Terminus
Killara via Strathfield towards Hornsby	Northern Line	Pymble continues as T1 towards Berowra
Preceding station	Intercity Trains	Following station
Chatswood towards Central	Central Coast & Newcastle Line Weekday peak hour services	Hornsby towards Gosford or Wyong

New South Wales Heritage Register
- Official name: Gordon Railway Station
- Type: State heritage (complex / group)
- Designated: 2 April 1999
- Reference no.: 1150
- Type: Railway Platform/Station
- Category: Transport – Rail
- Builders: New South Wales Department of Railways
Location

Gordon railway station is a heritage-listed suburban railway station located on the North Shore line, serving the Sydney suburb of Gordon. It is served by Sydney Trains T1 North Shore & Western Line and T9 Northern Line services and intercity Central Coast & Newcastle Line services. Situated on St Johns Avenue, the station was designed and built by the New South Wales Department of Railways in 1909. The property was added to the New South Wales State Heritage Register on 2 April 1999.

== History ==
In 1887, tenders were called for construction of a branch line extending south from Hornsby to the North Shore. The 16.8-kilometre (10.4 mi) section between Hornsby and St Leonards was opened on 1 January 1890. Stations provided at the opening of the line included Chatswood and St Leonards. A single line was constructed at the time. The line between St Leonards and Milson's Point (the terminus at the edge of the harbour) was completed 1 May 1893.

Gordon railway station was opened on 1 January 1890. In 1909 the single line was duplicated between Hornsby and St. Leonard's. At Gordon, during the duplication the original single platform and station building were replaced by a new island platform with a standard brick island-platform style station building. The island platform served the Up North Shore line and the Down North Shore line. A third platform was built at Gordon (the Local Platform) adjacent to the Up line. This platform allowed for termination of local trains at Gordon. At the time of duplication, an overhead footbridge and booking office was built which allowed local residents to cross from one side of Gordon to the other and allowed access to the platforms via sets of steps.

A goods siding (adjacent to the Down line), crossovers and a signal box on the platform (part of the station building) completed the track arrangement.

Originally southbound services used Platform 1 with Platform 2 a terminal road with a buffer stop at the northern end. In the early 1990s, the station was reconfigured with Platform 2 becoming the main southbound platform and Platform 1 the terminal road. Timetable changes in the late 2010s meant that southbound services began reusing Platform 1, with Platform 2 returning to a terminal road again.

Since the 1990s, a number of car parks have been built. In 2014, the bus stop on the station's western side was demolished to make way for a three-storey carpark and bus interchange. The new interchange opened in early June 2015.

The station was upgraded with the provision of lifts in 2005.

== Description ==
=== Buildings and structures ===
The buildings comprise a station building, including a signal box, and platforms 2/3, completed c. 1909; an overhead booking office, completed c. 1910; and station building and platform 1, completed in 1993.

Other structures include a footbridge, completed in 1909; platforms, completed in 1909; and modern steel shelters.

=== Context ===
Gordon Railway Station is located east of the Pacific Highway at Gordon. The station includes three platforms; an early 20th century overhead walkway and booking office with modern lift towers on the northern side; an early 20th century station building on an island platform; a reconstructed late 19th century timber waiting room; and an easement approximately 10m wide on either side of the railway tracks, which has been landscaped. The station is accessed via modern stairs and disabled ramp from either side of the station. There is a commercial strip on the western side of the Pacific Highway immediately across the road from the station.

=== Station building (c. 1909) ===
Exterior: Located on the island platform (Platform 2/3) the station building c. 1909 is a good representative example of the standard railway design A8-A10 station buildings along the Northern line. Walls are red face brick, tuck pointed with moulded rendered string course, architraves and window sills. The gabled roof is modern corrugated steel, and the ends are timber boarded. The lower pitched awnings over the platform are supported on cast iron awning brackets springing from moulded rendered corbels. One face brick chimney with rendered top is sited along the ridge line. At the northern end of the building is located a brick signal box with encircling sliding 6-paned windows on three sides under the main roof line. The exterior of the station is largely in original condition, with no additional openings or infilled elements.

Interior: The interior of the Platform 2/3 station building contains a high degree of original fabric and layout. Original internal details include mini-orb ceiling, ceiling roses, plastered wall finishes with moulded dado, and door and window joinery including 16-paned coloured glass sashes. The floor has been replaced with concrete, and modern fluorescent lighting installed. The interior of the signal box is painted brick to window sill height and timber boarded above the windows, with a mini orb ceiling and timber floor. Fittings include the 28 lever frame, key box, 1927 Indicator board, 1969 indicator board, original timber desk and bells.

=== Overhead booking office ===
Exterior: The timber framed and weatherboard clad booking office was constructed in 1910 and located on the overhead platform. It has a gabled roof of modern corrugated iron steel with finials. The roof overhang and projecting gable on the southern side provides a sheltered area for ticket purchasing, and features timber boarded ceiling and rose. Two modern ticket windows have been inserted into original openings with decorative timber architraves remaining. Other modern ticket machines have been recessed into the building in new openings with profiled timber architraves. Two new steel and glass lifts are located on the north side of the building and overbridge. New access structures to these lifts have been constructed in a similar style and material to the original booking office, and feature coloured glass panels. The lift access structure on the eastern side includes two small commercial tenancies, only one of which is presently occupied.

Interior: Internally the original layout of the building appears to have been largely altered. Timber panelled wall linings appear original, although the battened plaster ceiling is not. Air-conditioning ducts and fluorescent lights are modern. Doors are timber panelled and windows are 4 or 6-paned sash, which all appear to be original.

=== Station building (1993) ===
A small timber-framed structure reconstructed in 1993 based on the design of the original 1890 waiting room. The structure is clad externally with timber weatherboards and has a skillion roof of corrugated steel. The structure is open with exposed framing, concrete floor and timber bench.

=== Footbridge ===
Dating from 1909 the footbridge has a steel haunched beam construction supported on steel trestles. The two bay structure spans two tracks on the eastern side and one track on the western side of the rail corridor. Markings of imported British steel manufacturers are visible, both Lanarkshire, and Dorman Long & Co., Middlesbrough. The concourse has a concrete deck and modern steel balustrades. Modern concrete steps on steel supports provide access to the island platform. Similar steps and disabled ramp provide access to the streets on either side of the station.

=== Platforms ===
The island platform (Platform 2/3) at Gordon was built in 1909 as part of the line duplication for the Northern line, and has brick faces and an asphalt platform surface. The overhead booking office and footbridge are located approximately at the halfway point of the platform, with the station building located at the southern end. Platform 1 also has brick faces and an asphalt surface and is likely to date from the same period.

=== Modern steel structures ===
As part of the upgrading of the station in which lifts were installed, steel framed shelters were installed at the northern end of both platforms.

=== Landscape ===
Both the eastern and western lengths of the rail corridor are landscaped with several mature trees and shrubs including poplars, jasmine, jacaranda, palms, agapanthus, camellias and lawned areas.

=== Moveable items ===
- 1914–1918 Honour Roll (overhead platform)
- 1927 and 1969 timber indicator boards still in use (overhead platform)
- Cast iron drinking fountain (Platform 2/3)

=== Condition ===
As at 26 October 2010, the overhead Booking Office was in good condition. Also in good condition were the two station buildings (Platform 2/3) and (Platform 1), the footbridge, the platforms, and the landscape. The modern steel shelters were assessed as being in very good condition.

The archaeological potential is considered low. The station group retains a high level of integrity, with sympathetic modern additions.

=== Modifications and dates ===
- 1927: Electrification of the North Shore line between Milson's Point and Hornsby was opened on 15 August 1927.
- 1928: Full electric services were provided 15 July 1928, and included services at Gordon. With electrification came automatic signalling and most signal boxes were closed. However, Gordon Signal Box remained in service until recent years (as with other North Shore signal boxes including North Sydney, Chatswood, Lindfield) due to the need for local control of terminating trains. When the principal signal control centres were opened at Sydney and Hornsby, these local signal boxes were closed, including Gordon. With electrification of the North Shore line, a relatively small 1500 V DC substation was built adjacent to the down North Shore line at Gordon.
- 1990s: The former Gordon substation was replaced by a modern DC substation on the opposite side of the line and the original substation building (brick) was demolished.
- n.d: Some relatively modern additions such as shelters / awnings have been provided on the island platform.

== Services ==
=== Platforms ===
Platform	Line	Stopping pattern	Notes
1	T1	services to Penrith, Emu Plains & Richmond via Central	
1	T9	services to Epping & Hornsby via Strathfield	
1	CCN	6 Morning peak hour services to Sydney Central	
2	T1	services to Penrith & Emu Plains via Sydney Central	some trains from Central terminate here and return to Penrith or Emu Plains
2	T9	services to Epping & Hornsby via Strathfield	some trains from Central terminate here and return to Epping or Hornsby via Strathfield
3	T1	services to Hornsby & Berowra	
3	CCN	6 Evening peak hour services to Gosford & Wyong	

=== Transport links ===
CDC NSW operates six bus routes via Gordon station, under contract to Transport for NSW:

Werona Ave:

- 582: to St Ives

Gordon Interchange:

- 195: to St Ives Chase Loop service
- 196: to Mona Vale
- 197: to Mona Vale & Macquarie University
- 560: to West Pymble Loop Service
- 562: to Macquarie University

Gordon is served by one NightRide route:

- N90: Hornsby station to Town Hall station

== Heritage listing ==
As at 26 October 2010, Gordon Railway Station Group is significant at a state level as an excellent representative example of an early 20th century suburban station building group located on the North Shore line, which retains a high degree of integrity and quality in its architectural detail. The station group demonstrates the importance of the role of the railway in opening up the areas of the northern suburbs of Sydney for settlement at this time. It is able to evoke an earlier era of rail travel through its grouping of the original Platform 2/3 station building, platforms and booking office, along with sympathetic later additions.

The station contributes to the cohesive character of the North Shore line, characterised by its early 20th century railway architecture, generally in landscaped settings, which demonstrates the rapid construction of this section of the rail network. Gordon station stands out in the North Shore group of stations, due to its overhead booking office, which is an unusual feature in this region.

Gordon railway station was listed on the New South Wales State Heritage Register on 2 April 1999 having satisfied the following criteria.

The place is important in demonstrating the course, or pattern, of cultural or natural history in New South Wales.

Gordon Railway Station is historically significant at a state level. Opened in 1890, Gordon Station was one of the first stations along the North Shore line, and demonstrates the role of the railway in facilitating the rapid subdivision and development of the northern suburbs of Sydney. The elements that contribute to this significance include the 1909-1910 station building, booking office, overhead walkway, and platforms.

The place is important in demonstrating aesthetic characteristics and/or a high degree of creative or technical achievement in New South Wales.

As a complex, Gordon Railway Station is of state aesthetic significance as a fine example of an early 20th Century railway station along the North Shore line, which retains a high degree of integrity and quality of detail. The elaborate nature of its architectural detail is perhaps indicative of the importance of Gordon Railway Station as an early intermediate terminus along the North Shore line. This station building contributes to the cohesive group of 20th century railway architecture which is characteristic of the northern section of the rail network, and demonstrates the rapid historical construction of the North Shore line. The reconstructed waiting room contributes to the general early 20th century character of the Gordon Railway Station, and is a physical record of one of the earliest structures at the station, although in itself it has little heritage value.

The place has strong or special association with a particular community or cultural group in New South Wales for social, cultural or spiritual reasons.

Gordon Railway Station has social significance as evidenced by the community involvement during the design and construction of the new lifts and access arrangements. Local historical societies are also known to include the station complex in historical tours of the local area, thereby demonstrating the high esteem held by particular members of the community for the Gordon Railway Station.

The place possesses uncommon, rare or endangered aspects of the cultural or natural history of New South Wales.

The location of the booking office on the overbridge is rare along the North Shore line, which is perhaps indicative of the importance of Gordon Railway Station as an early terminus along this line.

The place is important in demonstrating the principal characteristics of a class of cultural or natural places/environments in New South Wales.

Gordon Railway Station is of representative significance at a state level as an early 20th century railway station complex. Elements that contribute to this significance include the 1909 station building, overbridge and platforms. The footbridge is a good representative example of such structures, of which 28 were constructed in Metropolitan Sydney, with a number still remain within the metro network. The brick station building on the island platform is a good and intact representative example of early 20th century station building constructed along the North Shore line.

== See also ==
- List of Railway stations in Sydney
