= Penrith railway station, Sydney =

Railway station in Sydney, New South Wales, Australia

Penrith
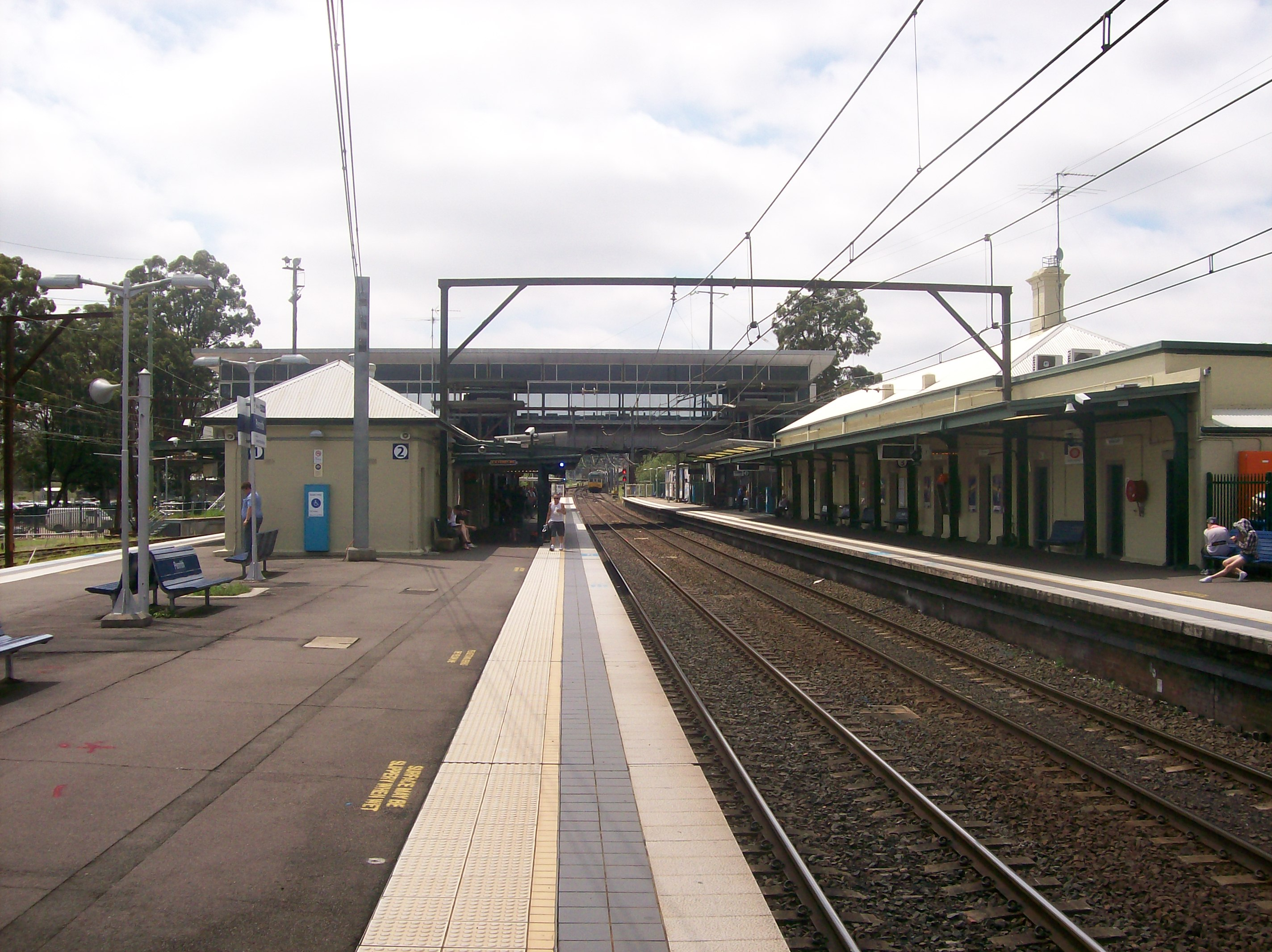
- Eastbound view from Platform 2 in November 2011

General information
- Location: Jane Street, Penrith; Sydney, New South Wales; Australia
- Coordinates: 33°45′01″S 150°41′47″E
- Elevation: 31 metres (102 ft)
- Owner: Transport Asset Manager of NSW
- Operator: Sydney Trains
- Line: Main Western
- Distance: 49.5 km (30.8 mi) from Central
- Platforms: 3 (1 island, 1 side)
- Tracks: 4
- Connections: Bus

Construction
- Structure type: Ground
- Accessible: Yes

Other information
- Status: Staffed
- Station code: PNR
- Website: Transport for NSW

History
- Opened: 19 January 1863 (163 years ago)
- Electrified: Yes (from October 1955)

Passengers
- 2025: 3,922,776 (year); 10,747 (daily) (Sydney Trains)
- Rank: 45

Services
Preceding station	Sydney Trains	Following station
Emu Plains Terminus	North Shore & Western Line	Kingswood towards Berowra
Terminus	North Shore & Western Line	Kingswood towards Berowra
Preceding station	Intercity Trains	Following station
Emu Plains towards Lithgow	Blue Mountains Line	Blacktown towards Central
Springwood towards Bathurst	Blue Mountains Line (twice daily) Bathurst Bullet	Westmead towards Central
Preceding station	NSW TrainLink	Following station
Katoomba towards Dubbo	NSW TrainLink Western Line Dubbo XPT	Blacktown towards Sydney
Katoomba towards Broken Hill or Dubbo	NSW TrainLink Western Line Broken Hill Outback Xplorer	Parramatta towards Sydney
Former services
Preceding station	Former services	Following station
Log Cabin Terminus	Main Western Line (special services) (1940–1950)	Kingswood towards Sydney

New South Wales Heritage Register
- Official name: Penrith Railway Station group
- Type: State heritage (complex / group)
- Designated: 2 April 1999
- Reference no.: 1222
- Type: Railway Platform / Station
- Category: Transport – Rail
- Builders: M. and A. Jamison and D. Forest (1863 building)
Location

Penrith railway station is a heritage-listed suburban railway station located on the Main Western line, serving the Sydney suburb of Penrith. The station is served by Sydney Trains T1 Western Line services and intercity Blue Mountains Line services, as well as NSW TrainLink Central West XPT and Outback Xplorer services. It was designed by New South Wales Government Railways and the 1863 building was built by M. and A. Jamison and D. Forest. It is also known as Penrith Railway Station group. The property was added to the New South Wales State Heritage Register on 2 April 1999.

== History ==
The single track line opened on 19 January 1863 as the terminus of the Main Western line when it was extended from St Marys. The line was extended to Springwood on 11 July 1867. The line was duplicated in 1886. As soon as the line was extended over the Blue Mountains, Penrith became an important railway centre where locomotives and crews were changed and passengers took refreshments. Trains were assisted in both directions from Penrith with additional locomotives but the status of Penrith locomotive depot diminished between 1913 and 1916 when new depots were opened at Valley Heights and Enfield. Penrith was closely associated with Driver John Heron and The Heron train was a daily commuter train to and from Sydney that was named after him.

The Platform 3 building dates from 1863. Additions were made in 1880 by contractor, F. Goodsell. In 1881 the original timber platform was replaced with an earth-filled structure. In 1895 the Railway Refreshment Room at the Sydney end was substantially expanded and further altered in 1906, 1917, 1929 and 1952, and closed in 1957. In 1901 a telegraph office was added. The posted verandah was replaced in 1955 with a cantilevered awning. Further upgrading took place in 1957, 1959, 1980 and 2003. Although many alterations have been made, there is a considerable amount of extant fabric both internally, externally and in the sub-floor area. In 2000, substantial alterations were made to the road elevation.

There is a dock platform behind Platform 3, which although raised in height, was also provided in 1863.

The Station Master's residence at Penrith was constructed in 1878. It was a common practice not to provide an official residence until an officer or a senior officer was appointed to the station. In this case, the residence was not provided until 15 years after the station opened. However, by this time, the station was very busy as locomotives were changed at Penrith and additional helper locomotives were added to trains crossing the Blue Mountains as well as pushing trains towards Sydney.

In the history of structures erected for the NSW Railways, buildings higher than one level were extremely rare. Out of a total of approximately 5,000 railway buildings in NSW, less than 50 were more than one level in height. This included offices, stations and residences. Penrith and Emu Plains became one of two locations where two-storey residences were built at adjoining stations. However, Penrith was built as a stand-alone residence, while Emu Plains was a combined office/residence building. The only other known metropolitan examples of standard two-storey residences were constructed at Lithgow, Newcastle and Lavender Bay demonstrating the importance of these locations as major terminus stations on the network.

Its symmetrical style and lack of adornments indicates a balance between an expression of status and financial restraint. They also reflect the railway residential style before 1880.

The Platform 1 & 2 building dates from c.1890. The building was partly converted to a Railway Refreshment Room in 1895, altered in 1917 and 1926, and closed in 1957. A new control room was added in 1989 and new meal room in 1990. The pitched roof was replaced with a flat roof but the 1890 posted verandah is extant. This was one of the last uses of posted verandahs on the NSW rail system.

In the 1890s, the 15-metre (50 ft) turntable at Penrith was replaced by the present facility. The existing is an imported turntable 18 metres (60 ft) in length and is cast steel and was a standard design imported from the American firm of William Sellers and co. Inc. at Philadelphia, who supplied large numbers of such items to the NSW Railways in the late 19th and early 20th centuries. It was fitted in 1896 in the locomotive depot at its present site and it is likely that the sandstone support wall was re-used from the earlier turntable. In 1926 it was strengthened with steel bracing and continued in service after the 1956 electrification of the line to serve those locomotives using the coal stage until at least 1970, even though the main depot had by then closed. In more recent years it has been disconnected from the sidings and presently is out of service. All remnants of the locomotive depot have been removed except the turntable, which is now physically isolated from the remainder of the network of tracks in the yard.

There is a 90,922 litres (20,000 imp gal) water tank built in 1921, at the Sydney end of the station. It was built in the Newcastle PerWay Workshop and is one of 82 extant tanks in NSW but one of only three in Sydney (2009). The water tank was erected to serve the expanding traffic needs for the Penrith Station, an important locomotive service stop prior to the Blue Mountains ascent. It was part of a series of water tanks at Penrith, with smaller ones for older locomotives replaced by this tank, while other earlier ones were still used at the Loco Depot until it was phased out.

The steel beam footbridge at Penrith was erected in 1953 and has been substantially altered.

The Platform 1 track was extended around the platform in 1955.

There is a 23-centimetre (9 in) water column at the end of Platforms 2 & 3, which was built in 1955. It is built to a design only used in electrified areas and is one of the only extant electrified types. This spout continued the tradition of filling the tender tanks of steam locomotives beside the platforms of railway stations using a modified design developed in the 1940s as the electrification system expanded and required a safer method of transferring water from the storage tanks into the tenders. This example was part of the last series of new water columns to be erected on the NSW rail system to serve locomotives with a relative few to follow on the Lithgow line in 1957 and along the Main North line to Newcastle some years later. The spout now has direct water main connection. Since c. 1990 it has been used by excursion steam locomotives.

The brick, elevated signal box was opened in 1956. It was among the last brick signal boxes constructed on the NSW rail system.

== Description ==
The complex comprises

- Station Buildings:
  - type 4, third class, brick, platforms 1 & 2 (c. 1890)
  - type 3, second class, brick, platform 3 (1863)
- Signal box – elevated brick, type S, polygonal tiled (1956)
- Station Master's residence (1878)
- Roadside platform & island platform – concrete faced (1863 & c. 1890)
- Footbridge – modern, steel beam & column structure over platforms and tracks (2000s)
- Water column & Filler spout – Up end platform 1/2 (1955)
- Water tank – Up end platform 3 (1921)
- Turntable (1896)

=== Platforms 1/2 building (c. 1890) ===
External: A third-class road side station building with corrugated metal hipped roof over the central building and the later wings on both ends. The original central building remains relatively unchanged and maintains its wide awning supported on cast iron turned posts and decorative brackets though roofing has been replaced with metal sheeting. The original timber joinery survive only on the central section of the building. The remaining joinery is relatively new.

Interior: Interiors of the building has been significantly modified with no evidence of earlier finishes visible. The floor layout remains essentially the same and used for staff meal and communication purposes with ticket office on the Up end of the building.

=== Platform 3 building (1863) ===
External: A large second-class roadside brick building with corrugated metal hipped roof and a brick double chimney with corbelled top. The building has been significantly modified with changes to its openings including reducing width of double doors into single doors and converting windows into door openings. Some timber door joinery survives. A corrugated metal awning supported on steel column & cantilevered beams replaced the original post supported timber decorative awning on rail side of the building. A flat roofed brick wing is attached to the Down end of the main 1863 station building and accommodates staff toilets and appears to have been an early addition. The roadside elevation of the building is asymmetric and is characterised by a series of tall multi-paned window openings with cement rendered decorative architraves around and a group of two arched windows on the projecting bay, and a pitched timber framed awning supported on timber post to the recessed bay. The roadside elevation of the building is rendered with paint finish while the other elevations are painted brick finish.

Interior: The Platform 3 building accommodates the Station Master's office, ticket offices and a large waiting/ticket window hall (formerly parcels and ticket offices). The interior of the waiting hall has been modified with only two corner columns with moulded plaster capitals and a cast iron turned post remaining from the original features. Large rectangular openings have been created on both side walls of the hall for easy circulation.

=== Signal box (1956) ===
Exterior: A two-storey face brick elevated signal box with polygonal signal tower and flat roofed stepped down wing. The box presents a design more like an airport control tower than a signal box. The lower floor level of the box features regularly placed metal framed windows with three horizontal panes while the control room of the tower features multi-paned glazing to Up, Down and rail side elevations. A polygonal hipped and tiled roof with wide eaves provides sun protection to the control room. The signal box is located at the Down side of Platform 1/2 of Penrith Station and is accessible from the platform side elevation of the tower.

Internal: The signal box is relatively intact with its equipment including CTC panel, communication and control desk, and staff instruments. A narrow timber stair with carpet finish provides access to the control room. The internal finishes are of typical 1950s design with plasterboard panelled ceiling and timber cornices for hidden lighting.

=== Station master's residence (1878) ===
Exterior: Constructed in 1878 the Penrith Station Master's residence is a two-storey English bond brickwork residence with paint finish and double corrugated metal hipped roof. It presents symmetrical fenestration to both street elevations with no decorative elements or embellishments. Two brick chimneys with corbelled tops are the distinctive features of the residence's roofscape.

The Belmore Street (front) elevation has a centrally located entrance door with transom above and two vertically proportioned double-hung sash timber windows with rendered sills on both sides. A corrugated metal ogee style timber framed veranda, supported on timber square posts with moulded tops over timber board flooring, covers the entire ground floor elevation. The upper floor level features two windows that match and align the ground floor windows.

The Station Street elevation of the residence is also similar to the front elevation in its symmetrical fenestration and window and door joinery as well as the ogee style veranda. The differences are the additional central window on the first floor level, and the L-shaped ogee verandah turned around eastern elevation with timber board enclosure featuring a small ticket window on the Belmore Street elevation. The verandah floor is concrete slab.

Two of the side elevations of the residence are secondary and utilitarian in nature.

Interior: The residence has a square-shaped floor layout with three similar sized rooms and kitchen, and an external skillion roof toilet on the ground floor, and four bedrooms with a bathroom on the upper level. The overall original features include fireplaces with timber surrounds (decorative mantels to ground floor fireplaces and simple mantels to upper level), timber architraves and spandrel of the timber staircase. The upper level fireplace grates are generally damaged and some of the ground floor fireplaces are either boarded or modified with shelf insertions. A number of later wall board linings and fibrocement ceiling panels exist on the upper level. The majority of the rendered walls show significant paint deterioration and flaking indicating rising damp issues in some rooms. The timber balustrade and handrail of the staircase are not original. No original bathroom, kitchen or light fittings survive. All windows have been fitted with security grills from the inside.

=== Platforms (roadside – 1863 & island – c. 1890) ===
Concrete faced roadside (Platform 3) and island (Platform 1/2) platforms with concrete deck and asphalt finish. Modern station furniture including timber bench seating, lighting, glass and metal canopies supported on steel columns with concrete footings, vending machines and aluminium fencing are other features of the Platforms. A newsagency/kiosk is located below the stairs of the footbridge on Platform 3. Access to the footbridge concourse is provided by a set of stairs and lifts from each platform.

=== Footbridge (2000s) ===
A new steel beam and column structure spanning over the platforms and the tracks. It is unclear if any of the original 1953 footbridge structural elements have been maintained within the new footbridge. The existing footbridge is essentially a contemporary design glass and steel structure with overhead concourse and stairs and lifts to each platform and amenities below.

=== Water column and Filler spout (1955) ===
A 9" Water Column with Filler Spout is located at the Up end of Platform 1/2. They are a 1950s adaptation of traditional design and were installed to cater for the electrified overhead wiring installed as part of electrification of the metropolitan rail network. Essentially it has 2 main parts – a cast iron vertical pipe that curves over the top to discharge into a lighter steel fabricated trough and swivel spout designed to reduce vertical splashing. A raised timber platform allows an operator to move the swivel spout. Designed by New South Wales Government Railways and built by New South Wales Government Railways Per Way Workshops, Newcastle.

=== Water tank (1921) ===
An unused large standard railway water tank and stand. It consists of cast iron with a 90,922 litres (20,000 imp gal) storage capacity single tier tank forming the top of the tower. The tank is elevated on steel posts with central nogging and two levels of steel cross wind bracing. The cast iron segmented tank fabricated from flat plates with radiused castings on the corners and bases all fastened with bolts. The tank is placed on steel beams and it is likely to have concrete lining internally possibly for additional strength.

Two water columns that once pumped water into the tank are attached to the underside of the tank. A steel inspection ladder is located on the west side of the tower that enabled access to the tank for maintenance purposes. The steel posts are fixed into the concrete footings.

=== Turntable (1896) ===
Access to the rail corridor for inspection of the Turntable was not possible (2009). However, study of the current aerial images of the railway yard provides enough evidence that the turntable is still in the similar form of its last inspection made in 2001. The turntable is not operational.

It is a cast iron and steel manual operation turntable centrally pivoted with each end moving on a circular rail line. It supports one set of a standard gauge railway line on hardwood sleepers flanked by timber decking and timber balustrades along each side. The turntable is 18 metres (60 ft) long and revolves within a cement paved dish having sandstone edge walls. The end locking plates are stamped "TT17". At each end are the stub ends of 2 railway tracks. Presently the turntable is isolated from the network and secured with a low steel mesh fence.

=== Landscape/garden features ===
The SM's residence is located within an unmaintained garden featuring mid-size trees and small shrubs. The residence is currently unoccupied and its allotment boundaries with the exception of Belmore Street boundary have been secured by wire mesh and pipe fencing.

=== Condition ===
- Platform 1/2 Building: Generally in moderate condition. It needs some repair and repointing at lower parts of the walls.
- Platform 3 Building – Generally in moderate condition with evidence of flaking paint along the lower sections of rail side elevation and rising damp damage on roadside elevation near the phone booths.
- Signal Box – In good condition with only minor crack near the entrance wall below the control room windows. A non-abrasive brick cleaning will be required in near future.
- SM's Residence – In moderate condition externally, however it is in poor condition internally.
- Platforms – In good condition.
- Footbridge – Good condition owing to its relatively new fabric.
- Water Column and Filler Spout – Generally in good condition.
- Water Tank – Generally in good condition with evidence of rusting throughout.
- Turntable – Appears to be generally in moderate condition and retains a high degree of archaeological potential.

The overall integrity of the station group has been relatively reduced by the later addition of canopies and an overhead bridge although the individual buildings remain relatively intact.

The residence is intact externally, however, the interiors have been modified significantly and therefore has low integrity internally.

The water tank, filler spout and water column possess a high degree of integrity.

While losing its historical context with the removal of the loco depot structures, the turntable itself is virtually intact with a significant sandstone wall.

=== Modifications and dates ===
- 1880 – additions were made by contractor, F. Goodsell to the Platform 3 Building
- 1895 – Platform 1/2 Building part converted to a Railway Refreshment Room altered in 1917 & 1926 (closed 1957)
- 1895 – the Railway Refreshment Room at the Sydney end of the Platform 3 Building was substantially expanded and further altered in 1906, 1917, 1929 & 1952 (closed 1957)
- 1901 – a telegraph office was added to the Platform 3 Building
- 1916 – The turntable was strengthened to accommodate heavier locomotives.
- 1955 – posted verandah replaced on the Platform 3 Building with cantilevered awning – further upgrading in 1957, 1959, 1980 and 2003.
- 1956 – Depot closed. All remnants of the locomotive depot have been removed except the turntable, which is now physically isolated from the remainder of the network of tracks in the yard.
- 1989 – new control room added to Platform 1/2 Building
- 1990 – new meal room added to the Platform 1/2 Building, and the pitched roof was replaced with a flat roof
- c. 1990 – Direct water main connection to Filler Spout used by excursion steam locomotives.
- 2000 – substantial alteration was made to the road elevation of the Platform 3 Building.
- c. 2000 – Footbridge – Extended up side – Upgraded and covered
- 2008 – Damage to front fence of Station Master's residence was repaired by replacement
- N.d – Considerable internal changes have been made to the Station Master's residence including replacement of timber balustrade to the staircase, removal of fireplace grates and boarding up, insertion of a bathroom to one of the upstairs rooms with timber board partition, replacement of ceiling panelling of one of the bedrooms, and changes to the floor finishes.

== Services ==
=== Platforms ===
Platform	Line	Stopping pattern	Notes
1	North Shore & Western Line	terminating services to & from Berowra, Hornsby, Gordon or North Sydney via Central & Chatswood	
2	North Shore & Western Line	Services to Berowra or Hornsby	
2	Blue Mountains Line	services to Central	
2	Western Region	services to Central	Set down only
3	North Shore & Western Line	services to Emu Plains only	
3	Blue Mountains Line	services to Springwood, Katoomba, Mount Victoria & Lithgow; 2 evening services to Bathurst	Pick up only
3	Western Region	services to Dubbo & Broken Hill	Pick up only

=== Transport links ===
Penrith station has a large bus interchange located on the south side of the station. Busways is the primary operator of routes around the Penrith area.

Stand A

- 770: To Mount Druitt via St Marys
- 774: To Mount Druitt via Nepean Hospital
- 775: To Mount Druitt via Erskine Park
- 776: To Mount Druitt via St Clair

Stand B

- 780: To Mount Druitt via Ropes Crossing
- 782: To St Marys via Werrington
- 783: To Jordan Springs
- 784: To Cranebrook
- 785: To Werrington via Cambridge Park
- 786: To North Penrith

Stand C

- 791: To Jamisontown via South Penrith
- 793: To Jamisontown
- 794: To Glenmore Park via The Northern Road
- 795: To Warragamba
- 797: To Glenmore Park
- 799: To Glenmore Park via Regentville

Stand D

- 673: To Windsor via Cranebrook
- 677: To Richmond via Londonderry
- 678: To Richmond via Cranebrook
- 781: To St Marys via Glenmore Park
- 789: To Luddenham
- NightRide route N70: To Town Hall station
- S13: To Mountainview Village

Stand E

- 688: To Emu Heights
- 689: To Leonay
- 690P: To Springwood
- 691: To Mount Riverview

Stand F

- Arrivals only

== Heritage listing ==
As at 18 October 2010, Penrith Railway Station is of state significance as an early railway site with buildings dating from the 1860s and as a former terminus for a number of years during the extension of the railway line over the Blue Mountains. The 1860s and 1890s station buildings are relatively intact examples of Victorian second-class and third-class station buildings and remain as important landmarks in the townscape of Penrith. The station was instrumental in the development of the main western railway line across the mountains and an important terminus for changing locomotives to cross the Blue Mountains as well as pushing trains towards Sydney.

The Penrith station master's residence is of state significance for its long association with Penrith station since 1878 and as only one of four known two storey residences constructed in the metropolitan region demonstrating its importance as a major terminus station on the NSW network. The residence is of aesthetic significance as a landmark within the Penrith station precinct and the town centre of Penrith providing a tangible link with the establishment of Penrith as an important railway location. Its simple Victorian Georgian detailing and lack of embellishment demonstrate the design and construction techniques of late 19th-century railway residences where aesthetic qualities and embellishments were restricted due to a balance between status and financial restraint.

The Penrith signal box is significant as evidence of Penrith station's role in assisting the railway traffic management between Sydney and the Blue Mountains since 1956. It is an unusual example of post World War II period Functionalist style railway signal boxes due to its polygonal signal tower presenting a design more like an airport control tower than a signal box. The signal box is a dominant feature within the station's setting when approached from the Down side.

The turntable at Penrith is significant as a railway relic from the early days of the operation of the locomotive depot that once existed immediately west of the Penrith station until 1956 and as the last physical reminder of what was a large locomotive depot and later coaling facility. While dating from 1896, the turntable represents an important function that was in existence at the station opening in 1863 when it was an important terminus.

The water tank, filler spout and water column are important surviving items of infrastructure supporting steam locomotive operation, denoting the close affiliation Penrith station has with steam train operations over the Blue Mountains.

Penrith railway station was listed on the New South Wales State Heritage Register on 2 April 1999 having satisfied the following criteria.

The place is important in demonstrating the course, or pattern, of cultural or natural history in New South Wales.

Penrith Station Group is of historical significance as an early railway site with buildings dating from the 1860s and as a former locomotive depot for a number of years during the extension of the railway line over the Blue Mountains. The Signal Box is historically important as evidence of Penrith Station's role in providing assistance to the management of the increased railway traffic between Sydney and the Blue Mountains since 1956.

The Station Master residence is of historical significance as it was built for the accommodation of the Penrith Station Master in 1878 when the Station was instrumental in the changing of the locomotives of the trains to cross the Blue Mountains as well as pushing trains towards Sydney. The residence had served successive Station Master's for many years and has been used for various community operations until the early 2000s. The historical visual link between the station and the residence is important, which remains relatively intact today with some interruption by the adjoining ancillary building to the west.

The water tank, filler spout and water column are important surviving steam locomotive supporting infrastructure dating from 1921, which denote the close affiliation Penrith Station has with steam train operations over the Blue Mountains, an association that started in 1863. Apart from the station buildings, the turntable is now the oldest item of railway structure remaining at Penrith dating from 1896. It is also the last item remaining from the former Penrith locomotive depot.

The place has a strong or special association with a person, or group of persons, of importance of cultural or natural history of New South Wales's history.

Penrith Station was closely associated with Driver John Heron and The Heron train was a daily commuter train to and from Sydney that was named after him. This association is considered to be of secondary significance.

The place is important in demonstrating aesthetic characteristics and/or a high degree of creative or technical achievement in New South Wales.

The station buildings are good examples of second class and third class station buildings despite the changes made over the years. They feature typical design characteristics of such roadside railway station buildings in the 1860s and 1890s, such as a large central brick building flanked by attached wing, simple hip roofs with multiple brick chimneys, a symmetrical layout and platform awning supported on cast iron columns with decorative bracketing.

The signal box is of aesthetic significance as a dominant feature within the station's setting presenting a design more like an airport control tower than a signal box. It is an unusual example of post World War II period Functionalist style railway signal boxes due to its polygonal signal tower and flat roofed stepped down wing featuring multi-paned glazing to Up, Down and rail side elevations of the control room of the tower, and a polygonal hipped and tiled roof with wide eaves.

Penrith SM's residence is of aesthetic significance as a landmark within the Penrith station precinct and the historic town of Penrith. It is a simply detailed symmetrical building demonstrating the construction techniques of the late 19th-century "type 4" railway residences, where aesthetic qualities and embellishments were restricted due to a balance between status and financial restraint.

The water tank, filler spout and water column are engineered structures of the steam industrial age. The turntable is an excellent example of a 19th-century cast-iron turntable.

The place has a strong or special association with a particular community or cultural group in New South Wales for social, cultural or spiritual reasons.

The place has the potential to contribute to the local community's sense of place and can provide a connection to the local community's history.

The place has potential to yield information that will contribute to an understanding of the cultural or natural history of New South Wales.

The signal box has a moderate degree of technical research potential as it retains its original communication and control desk, CTC panel and staff signalling equipment. These features, however, are found at many other signal boxes in the railway network.

Penrith SM's residence has research potential in providing physical evidence on the construction techniques of a two-storey type 4 Station Master's residence built in the late 19th century.

The water tank, filler spout and water column are of technical and research significance demonstrating the equipment used in providing large quantities of water very quickly to steam locomotives. The turntable is of technical and research potential demonstrating the equipment used in steam locomotive operations.

The place possesses uncommon, rare or endangered aspects of the cultural or natural history of New South Wales.

Penrith Station Group features a number of rare items including a filler spout and water column, which are one of a few such facilities remaining in operating condition on the system. The signal box is one of a series of five similar signal boxes built in the Functionalist style, the others being Granville, Clyde, Blacktown and Auburn. There are many good examples of Inter-War Functionalist style signal boxes in the railway network.

Penrith SM's residence is only one of four known two-storey residences constructed in the metropolitan region demonstrating its importance as a major terminus station on the NSW network. However, better examples exist at Lithgow and other regional locations.

Penrith turntable is one of a decreasing number of turntables on the system, and rare in the metropolitan network.

The place is important in demonstrating the principal characteristics of a class of cultural or natural places/environments in New South Wales.

Penrith Station Group is a representative example of railway station arrangements combining a range of buildings and structures dating from the 1860s, 1890s and post-war period to the present day including Victorian second class and third class roadside station buildings, a signal box, water tower, water column and filler spout, footbridge and overhead booking office. The water tank is one of approximately 13 (2009) water tanks remaining in-situ in the Sydney metropolitan area, the others include Eveleigh and Cardiff although most are now unused. The signal box is representative of the style of signal box built on the Main Western Line after World War II. Penrith Station Master's residence is a representative example of a type 4 two-storey residences built in the late 19th century demonstrating the balance between the status and financial restraint at the time. The turntable is a good example of similar types surviving in rural centres.
