= Emu Plains railway station =

Railway station in Sydney, New South Wales, Australia

Emu Plains
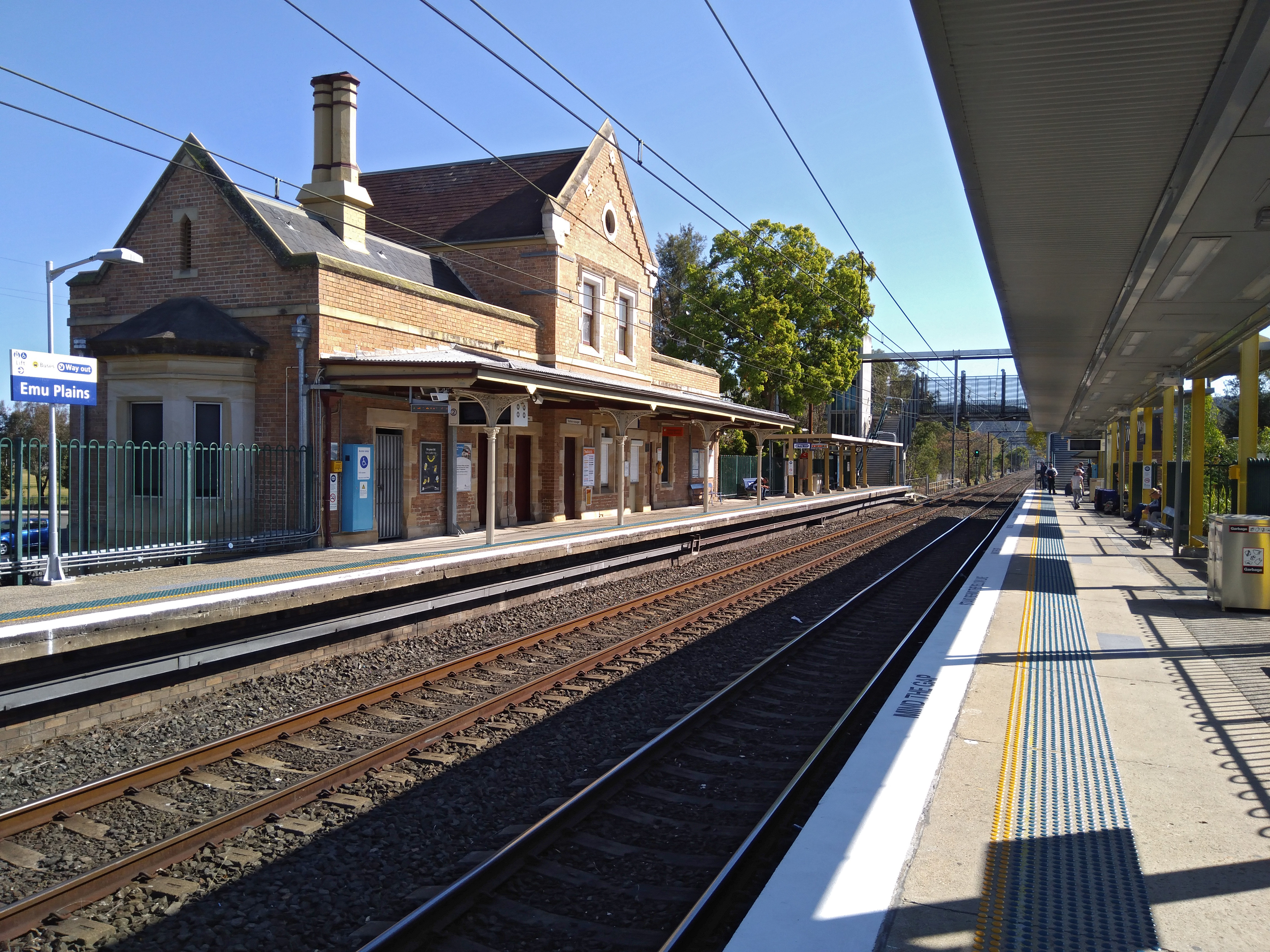
- View from Platform 1 looking at station building in September 2017

General information
- Location: Station Street, Emu Plains; Sydney, New South Wales; Australia
- Coordinates: 33°44′44″S 150°40′20″E
- Elevation: 28 metres (92 ft) AHD
- Owner: Transport Asset Manager of NSW
- Operator: Sydney Trains
- Line: Main Western
- Distance: 57.44 km (35.69 mi) from Central
- Platforms: 2 (2 side)
- Tracks: 2
- Connections: Bus

Construction
- Structure type: Ground
- Accessible: Yes

Other information
- Status: Weekdays: Staffed: 6am to 7pm: Weekends and public holidays: Unstaffed
- Station code: EPS
- Website: Transport for NSW

History
- Opened: 18 August 1868 (158 years ago)
- Rebuilt: 1884 (142 years ago)
- Electrified: Yes (from April 1956)

Passengers
- 2025: 541,688 (year); 1,484 (daily) (Sydney Trains)
- Rank: 156

Services
Preceding station	Sydney Trains	Following station
Terminus	North Shore & Western Line Weekdays only	Penrith towards Berowra
Preceding station	Intercity Trains	Following station
Lapstone towards Lithgow	Blue Mountains Line	Penrith towards Central
Glenbrook towards Lithgow	Blue Mountains Line Limited express	Penrith towards Central

New South Wales Heritage Register
- Official name: Emu Plains Railway Station group
- Type: State heritage (complex / group)
- Designated: 2 April 1999
- Reference no.: 1136
- Type: Railway Platform / Station
- Category: Transport – Rail
- Builders: M. Reed et al.
Location

Emu Plains railway station is a heritage-listed suburban railway station located on the Main Western line, serving the Sydney suburb of Emu Plains. It is served by Sydney Trains T1 Western Line services and intercity Blue Mountains Line services. It was designed by the New South Wales Government Railways and built from 1884 to 1907 by M. Reed, et al. It is also known as Emu Plains Railway Station group. The property was added to the New South Wales State Heritage Register on 2 April 1999.

== History ==
=== Emu Plains ===
The township of Emu was renamed Emu Plains in 1882. It was on the Great Western Road (later Highway) from Sydney over the Blue Mountains to Bathurst and had several inns between the Nepean River and the foot of Lapstone Hill from the 1830s.

Emu Plains may have been named for the sighting of emus on the river flats, in the late 1700s or may have originated from soldier Captain Watkin Tench in his early exploration of part of the region. The name Emu Plains came into use around 1814. The Government Farm was established here in 1819 by Governor Macquarie, where convicts cleared land and cultivated wheat, maize, tobacco and other crops for 13 years. The town of Emu was surveyed for settlers in the early 1830s. By this time a road had been established across the Blue Mountains to the Bathurst plains and more land was being sought for the expansion of Sydney town. The convict farm was officially closed in 1832 and the land sold.

The Nepean River was first crossed by the ford and the Emu ferry. The challenge to bridge the river was thwarted several times by significant floods which occurred regularly. The final bridge which met the challenge was the Victoria Bridge, a road/rail structure. This was given over to road traffic only in 1907, when a new railway bridge opened.

=== Main Western railway line ===
The single Main Western railway line was opened in 1867 and duplicated from Penrith West in 1907, in conjunction with the opening of the existing double track bridge over the Nepean River. The Emu Plains Railway Station opened on 18 August 1868 on the south side of the Bathurst Road. It is a two-storey structure with the station master's residence upstairs. It is one of the oldest railway stations in Australia. A Victorian Gothic Revival style building, it is one of only three remaining metropolitan examples (with Fairfield and Riverstone) of the early custom of providing accommodation for railway staff within the same building as the station facilities, and is the only two-storey metropolitan example.

In 1882, the NSW Government Railways decided to relocate the station site and abandoned the 1868 building. NSWGR erected the existing two-storey structure in 1884, which combines both station offices and the Station Master's residence. A telegraph office was opened at the station a year later.

The building has undergone various internal modifications. The railway line from Penrith was electrified in 1956.

A second side platform was built in 1907 but the original waiting shed was replaced in 1978 with a concrete block structure, which has also been removed. There is also a steel shelter shed on the second platform dating from c. 1994. The two side platforms are connected by an overhead pedestrian bridge built in 1990. Emu Plains is the western extremity of the Sydney Trains network with points at the eastern end of the station allowing services to terminate at either platform.

== Description ==
=== Landscape features ===
Rows of mature trees, possibly dating from the early 1900s, are located along the northern boundary and eastern part of the southern boundary and may have some landscape value. On the southern side of the complex and tracks towards Railway Row, these include three jacarandas (J.mimosifolia), a large camphor laurel (Cinnamommum camphora), several mature river or she-oaks (Casuarina cunninghamiana), a Queensland black bean or native chestnut (Castanospermum australe) further away in the car parking area, white cedar (Melia azederach var.australasica).

=== Buildings ===
- Station Building & Residence – Platform 2, type 1 (1884)
- Ticket Machine Shelter – Platform 1 (c. 2008)

=== Structures ===
- 2 x platforms, roadside, brick & concrete faced (1884 & 1907)
- Footbridge, prestressed concrete girder (1990)

=== Station building and residence (1884) ===
Exterior: Emu Plains station building is a Victorian Gothic Revival style building combining the station office and Station Master's residence upstairs. Constructed of face brick with stone detailing the building presents two-storey to the platforms and three-storey to the street.

Distinctive features include a steep parapeted gabled slate roof along width with front & rear transverse parapeted gable at the centre over the upper floor of the residence, two medieval-style chimneys to ground floor wings, stone parapet and gable capping, stone label mould throughout, fretted motif to front & rear gable ends with decorative round gable vent to front, and a pitched corrugated metal verandah supported on decorative cast iron columns along the platform facade. A faceted window bay to the basement and ground floor levels with slate pitched roof and moulded top dominates the eastern end of the building. Eastern gable ends of the main roof feature a rectangular gable vent with stone lintel and sill.

The platform (north) elevation of the building retains its original fenestration with some modifications to the central window and two door openings. Changes include conversion of the central window with sidelights into a ticket window with aluminium frames and frosted glass to sidelights, the adjoining door opening to the west has also been converted into a ticket window with roller shutter, and the door to the eastern room has been replaced. The three-storey rear (south) elevation of the building presents a secondary and more ancillary elevation with all original window and door openings clearly visible, some bricked in and some converted into smaller window openings. New small windows openings are also evident.

The Station Master's residence is accessed via a concrete stair with half-arched string from the rear.

Interior: The building generally retains its original floor layout with minor changes, and is currently undergoing significant restoration and repair works in particular to the residence. The station offices have been refurbished at some time however they still feature some original detailing such as timber board ceiling linings, ceiling rose to main office, lath & plaster ceilings with later ceiling panels.

All internal features of the Station Master's residence have been stripped-off with all structural elements essentially being exposed. The basement level features a series of semi-circular arches between the spaces, and timber beam and joist ceiling to ground floor supported with additional steel beams for structural stability, face brickwork to walls, kitchen fireplace, and exposed service pipes. The layout of the ground floor of the residence remains in its original configuration with some of the fireplace timber surrounds and custom orb metal ceiling and lath & plaster ceilings with ceiling rose surviving. All internal door and window joinery has been removed. A timber staircase with turned timber newel posts and square balusters provides access to the upper floor of the residence. Walls of the staircase are clad with later unsympathetic timber boards which extends into the majority of the upper floor rooms. Original lath & plaster ceiling is visible where the plaster is damaged or removed. No original fittings remain.

=== Ticket machine shelter (c. 2008) ===
A face brick shelter with corrugated metal gabled roof with round gable motif, reflecting the original station building, is located at the western end of Platform 1 just off the platform stairs and exit to Mackellar Street. The platform and stair sides are open with a corrugated metal steel framed awning along the platform elevation. It provides shelter to the ticket machine.

=== Platforms 1 and 2 (1884 and 1907) ===
Both platforms are roadside platforms with brick faces on the bottom half and concrete faces on the upper half indicating raised platform levels. The concrete decks of the platforms are finished with asphalt. Platform 1 was constructed in 1907 as part of the duplication of the Western rail line. An earlier steel shelter dating c. 1994 is located on Platform 2 to the west of the station building. A new canopy with steel supports and awning frame is currently under construction along Platform 1. Modern aluminium palisade fencing, timber bench seating, lighting and security and safety equipment are the other features of the platforms.

On the northern (McKellar Street) side of the Up Platform are 11 jacaranda (J.mimosifolia) trees possibly dating to the early 1900s.

=== Footbridge (1990) ===
The existing footbridge with stairs to each platform was constructed in 1990 and is a typical pre-stressed concrete girder footbridge. Plain metal balustrades provide safety along both sides of the footbridge and the stairs.

=== Moveable items ===
An early safe with asset number 218 (similar to Ajax manufacturing safes in size and material) is located in the station office.

=== Potential archaeological features ===
There are no visible evidence of earlier structures/station building on the site and given consideration to the changes made over the years it is unlikely any remnants of these structures would survive. The site has low archaeological potential.

=== Condition ===
As at 2 July 2014:

- Station Building & Residence – The building generally is in good condition;
- Ticket machine Shelter – It is in very good condition owing to its relatively new structure;
- Platforms – Both platforms are in good condition; and
- Footbridge – It is in good condition with no evidence of structural issues.

The station building is intact externally. It is also relatively intact internally, and although the majority of its finishes have been removed it retains the original floor layout and structural floor and ceiling elements.

=== Modifications and dates ===
- 1907 – A second side platform was built
- c. 1994 – A steel shelter shed on the second platform erected
- 2008–09 – Substantial refurbishment and restoration works to Station Master's residence, construction of lifts on both ends of the footbridge, and erection of new steel canopy along Platform 1.

=== Further information ===
Remnants of the ex-rail line to the gravel quarry is located on Mackellar Street further to the east of the Emu Plains station. The siding is no longer within the RailCorp property boundaries and is not included in this listing.

== Services ==
=== Platforms ===
Platform	Line	Stopping pattern	Notes
1	T1	terminating services to & from Hornsby, Gordon, Berowra or North Sydney via Central & Chatswood	only on weekdays
1	BMT	services to Central	
2	T1	terminating services to & from Hornsby, Gordon, Berowra or North Sydney via Central & Chatswood	only on weekdays (occasionally used)
2	BMT	services to Springwood, Katoomba, Mount Victoria & Lithgow	

=== Transport links ===
Blue Mountains Transit operates three bus routes via Emu Plains station, under contract to Transport for NSW:

- 688: Emu Heights to Penrith station
- 689: Leonay to Penrith station
- 691: Mount Riverview to Penrith station – passengers must join/alight at the Great Western Highway
- 690P: Springwood to Penrith station – passengers must join/alight at the Great Western Highway

== Heritage listing ==
As at 26 October 2010, Emu Plains Railway Station is of state significance as an early station dating from 1884 marking an important location in the development of the railway at the foot of the ascent of the Blue Mountains. The 1884 station building, combining a Station Master's residence and station offices, is an excellent example of a Victorian era Gothic Revival style railway building representing the prosperity and architectural achievement at the time. The building is one of only three extant Metropolitan examples demonstrating the former custom of providing accommodation for railway staff within the same building as the station facilities. Although other earlier associated structures have been removed from the place, the station remains as an important landmark in the locality. The mature trees around the station group enhance its streetscape presentation and landmark quality.

Emu Plains railway station was listed on the New South Wales State Heritage Register on 2 April 1999 having satisfied the following criteria.

The place is important in demonstrating the course, or pattern, of cultural or natural history in New South Wales.

Emu Plains station group is of historical significance as an early railway station dating from 1884 and as an important location in the development of the railway marking the foot of the ascent of the Blue Mountains.

The place is important in demonstrating aesthetic characteristics and/or a high degree of creative or technical achievement in New South Wales.

The station building combining a Station Master's residence and station offices is an excellent example of a Victorian Gothic Revival style building featuring face brickwork, fretted motifs to gable ends, stone quoins to the openings, medieval-style chimneys, stone capping and mouldings.

The place has a strong or special association with a particular community or cultural group in New South Wales for social, cultural or spiritual reasons.

The place has the potential to contribute to the local community's sense of place and can provide a connection to the local community's history.

The place has potential to yield information that will contribute to an understanding of the cultural or natural history of New South Wales.

Emu Plains station group has research significance for its ability to provide physical evidence of Victorian era type 1 (subtype 3) combined residence and office station buildings. It also provides evidence of the defunct custom of providing accommodation for railway employees.

The place possesses uncommon, rare or endangered aspects of the cultural or natural history of New South Wales.

Emu Plains station building, together with Fairfield and Riverstone, is one of three Metropolitan examples of combined residences/offices station buildings (type 1), and is the only two-storey Metropolitan example of this type.

The place is important in demonstrating the principal characteristics of a class of cultural or natural places/environments in New South Wales.

The station group is a representative example of late Victorian period railway stations, demonstrating characteristics and architectural quality as well as prosperity in the railway development. The Gothic Revival station building is an excellent example of its style.
