= Hornsby railway station =

Railway station in Sydney, New South Wales, Australia

Hornsby
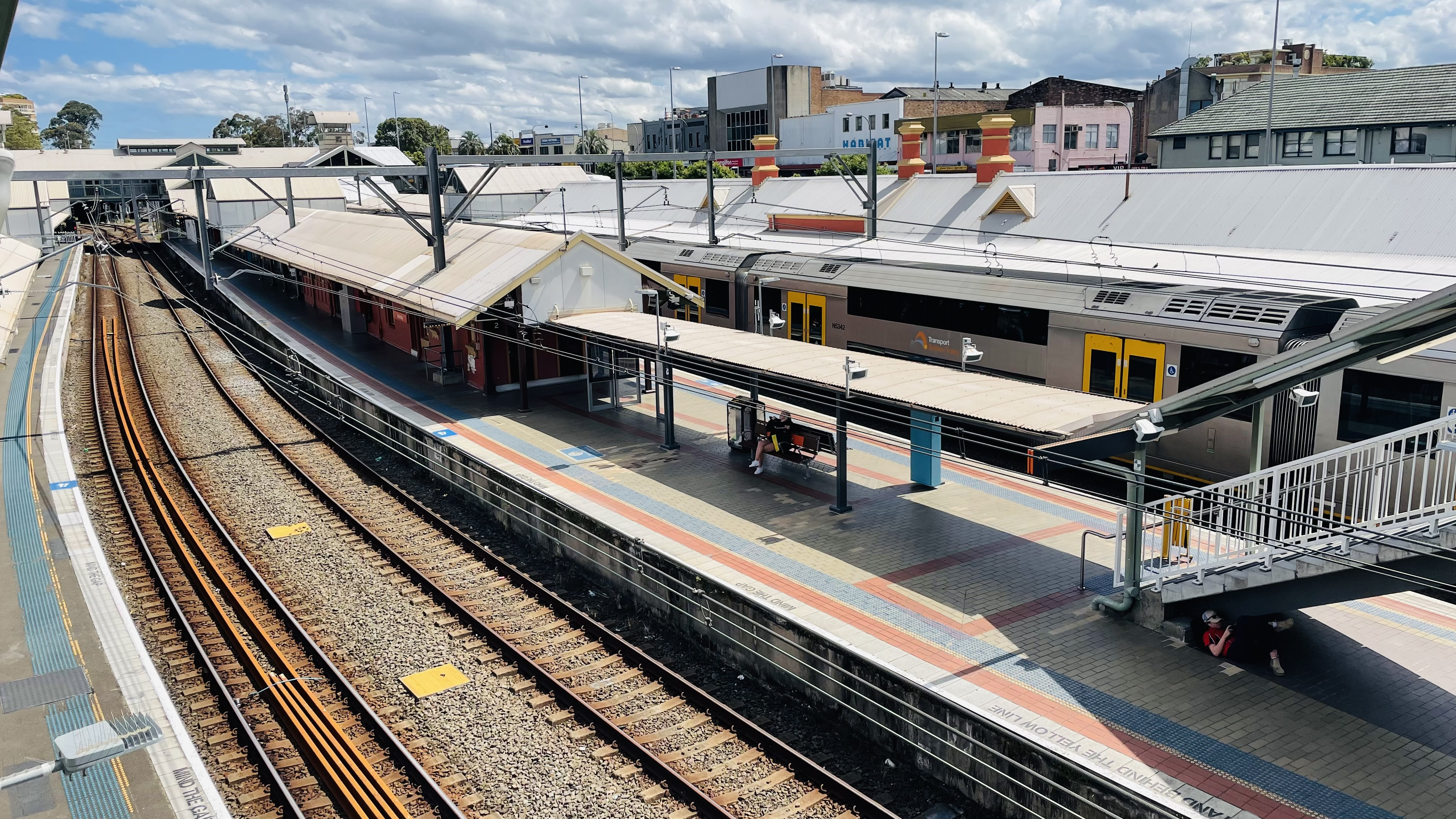
- Southbound view of the platforms, November 2022

General information
- Location: George Street, Hornsby, New South Wales; Australia
- Coordinates: 33°42′11″S 151°05′55″E
- Elevation: 187 metres (614 ft)
- Owner: Transport Asset Manager of NSW
- Operator: Sydney Trains
- Lines: Main North; North Shore
- Distance: 33.86 km (21.04 mi) from Central via Strathfield
- Platforms: 5 (1 side, 2 island)
- Tracks: 5
- Connections: Bus

Construction
- Structure type: Ground
- Accessible: Yes

Other information
- Status: Staffed
- Station code: HBY
- Website: Transport for NSW

History
- Opened: 17 September 1886 (139 years ago)
- Electrified: Yes (from 1926)
- Former names: Hornsby Junction (1894–1900)

Passengers
- 2025: 6,634,332 (year); 18,176 (daily) (Sydney Trains)
- Rank: 24

Services
Preceding station	Sydney Trains	Following station
Asquith towards Berowra	North Shore & Western Line	Waitara towards City
Terminus	Northern Line	Normanhurst towards Gordon via Central
Preceding station	Intercity Trains	Following station
Asquith Limited services towards Newcastle Interchange	Central Coast & Newcastle Line	Epping towards Central
Berowra towards Newcastle Interchange	Central Coast & Newcastle Line	Epping towards Central
Berowra towards Gosford or Wyong	Central Coast & Newcastle Line Weekday peak only	Gordon towards Central
Woy Woy towards Newcastle Interchange	Central Coast & Newcastle Line Express	Epping towards Central
Preceding station	NSW TrainLink	Following station
Gosford towards Grafton, Casino or Brisbane	NSW TrainLink North Coast Line	Strathfield towards Sydney
Gosford towards Moree or Armidale	NSW TrainLink North Western Line	Strathfield towards Sydney
Location

Hornsby railway station is a suburban railway station located at the junction of the Main North and North Shore lines, serving the Sydney suburb of Hornsby. It is served by Sydney Trains T1 North Shore Line and T9 Northern Line services and intercity Central Coast & Newcastle Line services, as well as NSW TrainLink regional services.

== History ==
The station opened on 17 September 1886 as Hornsby, but was renamed Hornsby Junction on 1 November 1894. This was due to the construction of Normanhurst station to the south, which was initially named Hornsby as it was located in what was the more densely populated area of Hornsby at the time. Naming the station Hornsby Junction was an attempt to avoid confusion, but it was realised that having two Hornsby stations was still very confusing. On 1 May 1900, the suburb and station to the south was renamed Normanhurst, and Hornsby Junction reverted to Hornsby.

On 1 January 1890, Hornsby became a junction station with the opening of the North Shore line to St Leonards. In 1894, a third platform was built along with a locomotive depot to the east of the station. Hornsby was the northern extremity of the electrified network from 1930 until it was extended to Gosford in 1960. The wires did continue north of the station as far as the Hornsby Maintenance Depot.

The station was extensively upgraded in 1986, including tiling of the platform, the addition of shelters and the modification of the southern concourse. The southern concourse was again extensively modified sometime between October 1994 and October 1995 to include brick lift shafts and accessibility to each platform.

As part of the CityRail Clearways Project, a fifth platform was constructed for use by through northbound trains. To allow for the new line, the Hornsby Signal Box was shifted 120 metres in 2007. The new platform opened on 16 March 2009, with the existing Platform 4 becoming a turnback platform for Northern line trains. The additional platform allows extra trains to run on the Northern line via the Epping to Chatswood line and improves reliability. As Hornsby is both an originating and terminating point for some services, on 10 July 2003 the communications system in a Millennium Train failed because the train's software could not compute that the origin and destination of the service had the same name.

== Platforms and services ==
Platform	Line	Stopping pattern	Notes
1	T1	Weekday services to Penrith, Richmond & Emu Plains	
1	T9	Weekend services to Epping & Hornsby via Gordon	
1	CCN	6 Weekday morning peak hour services to Sydney Central via Gordon	
2	T1	Terminating services from Central; Services to Berowra	
2	CCN	6 Weekday evening peak hour services to Gosford & Wyong	
3	T9	Services to Central & Gordon via Strathfield	
3	CCN	Services to Sydney Central	
3	North Coast Region	Services to Sydney Central	Set down only
3	North Western Region	Services to Sydney Central	Set down only
4	T9	Terminating services to and from Central & Gordon via Strathfield	
5	North Coast Region	Services to Grafton, Casino & Brisbane	Pick up only
5	North Western Region	Services to Armidale/Moree	Pick up only
5	CCN	Services to Gosford, Wyong & Newcastle	

== Transport links ==
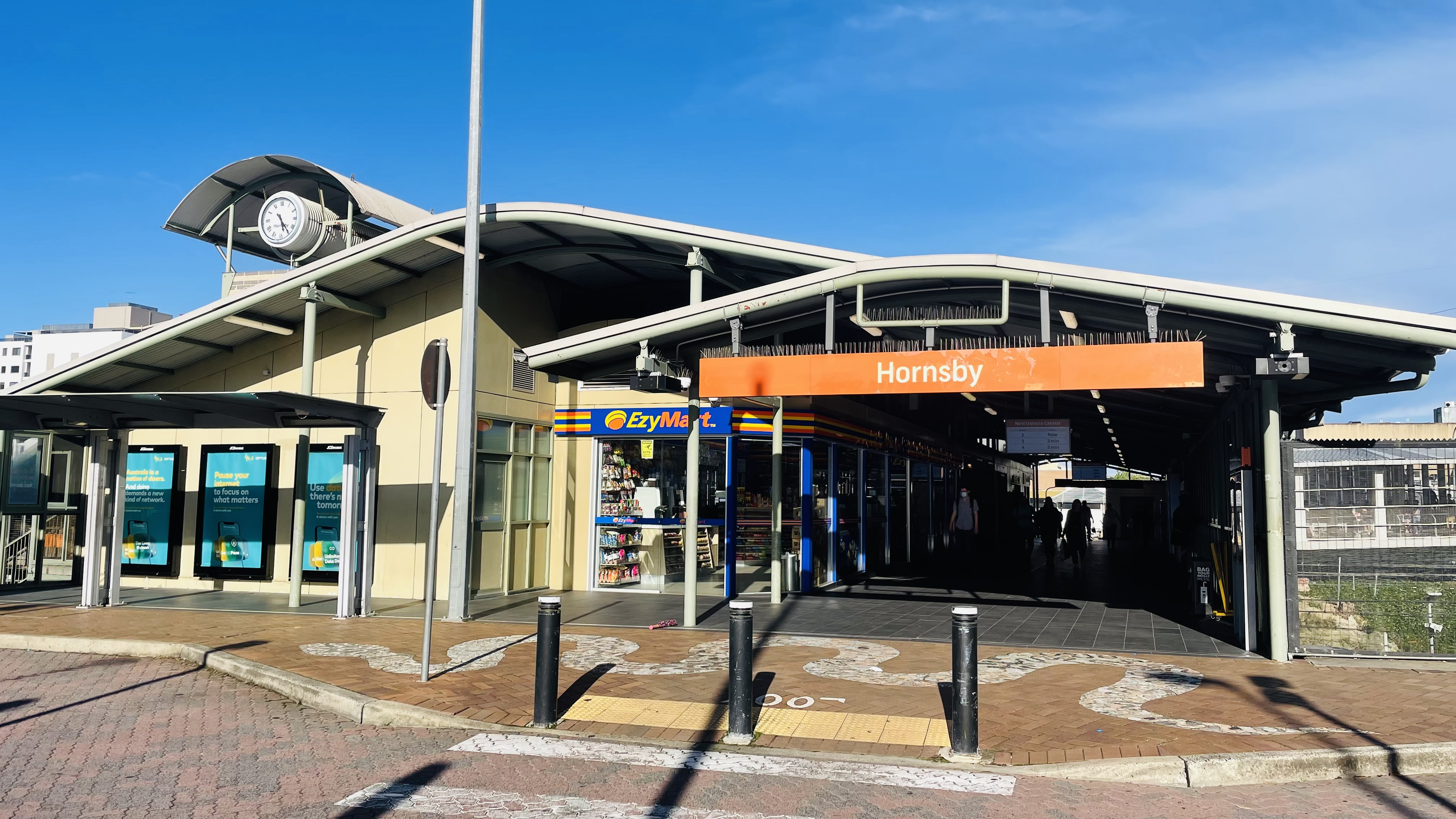
Western side building and entrance, October 2022

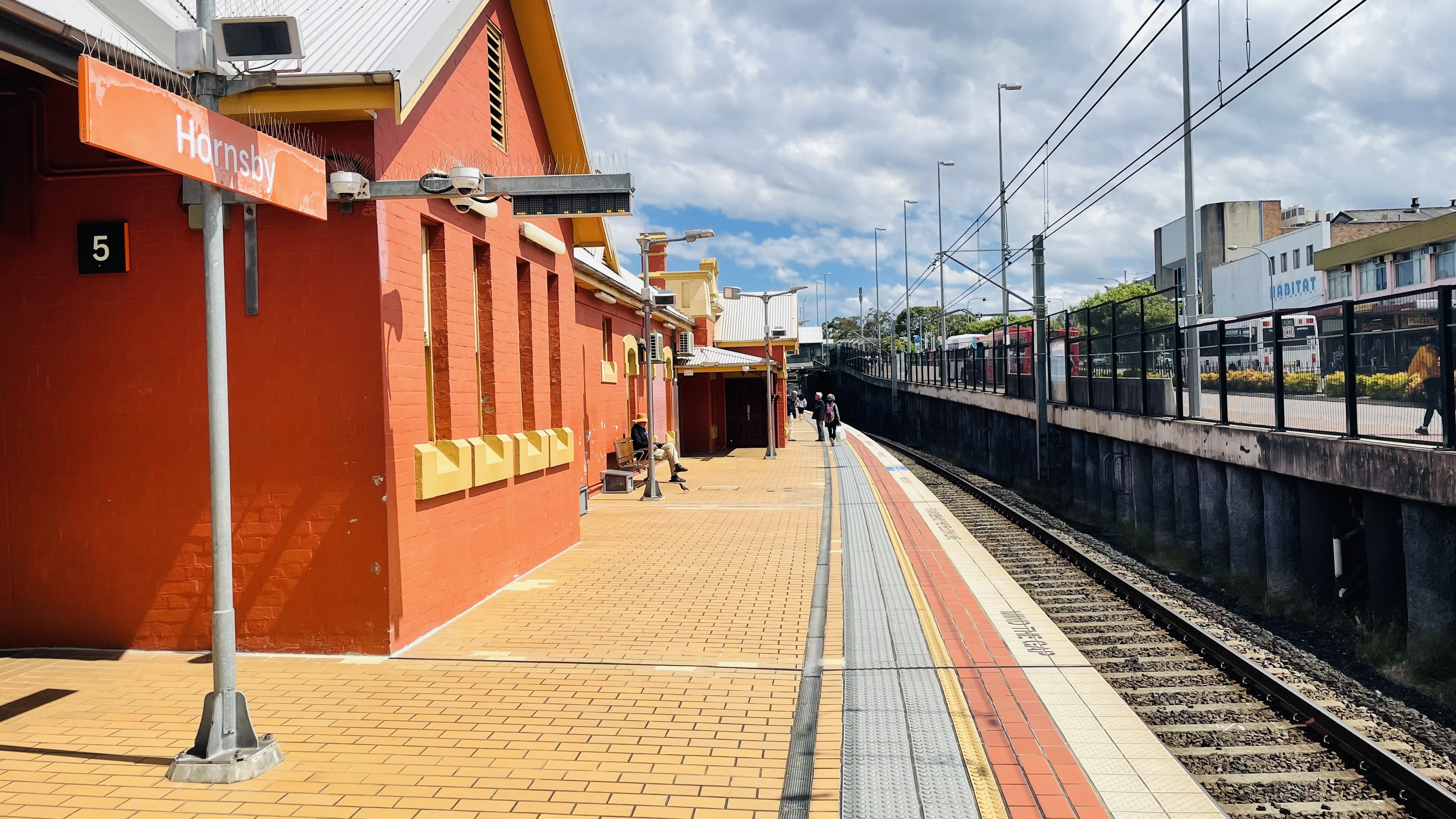
Platform 5, completed in 2009 as part of Rail Clearways Program

CDC NSW operates eleven bus routes via Hornsby station, under contract to Transport for NSW:

- 575: to Macquarie University via Turramurra
- 587: to Westleigh
- 588: to Normanhurst West
- 589: to Sydney Adventist Hospital
- 590: to Pennant Hills via Thornleigh and Normanhurst
- 591: to St Ives
- 592: to Brooklyn & Mooney Mooney
- 595: to Mount Colah
- 596: to Hornsby Heights
- 597: to Berowra station
- 598: Hornsby Loop via Asquith

Hornsby is also the terminus of two NightRide routes:

- N80: to Town Hall station via Strathfield
- N90: to Town Hall station via Chatswood

== Trackplan ==
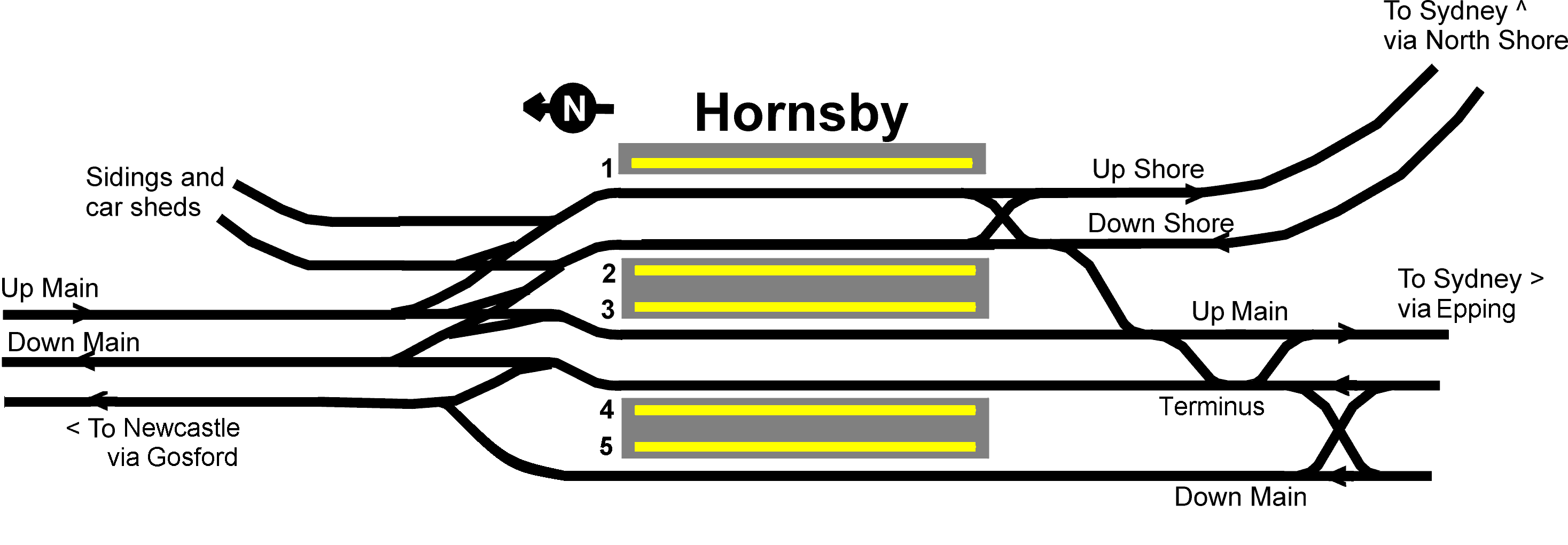
Current track layout

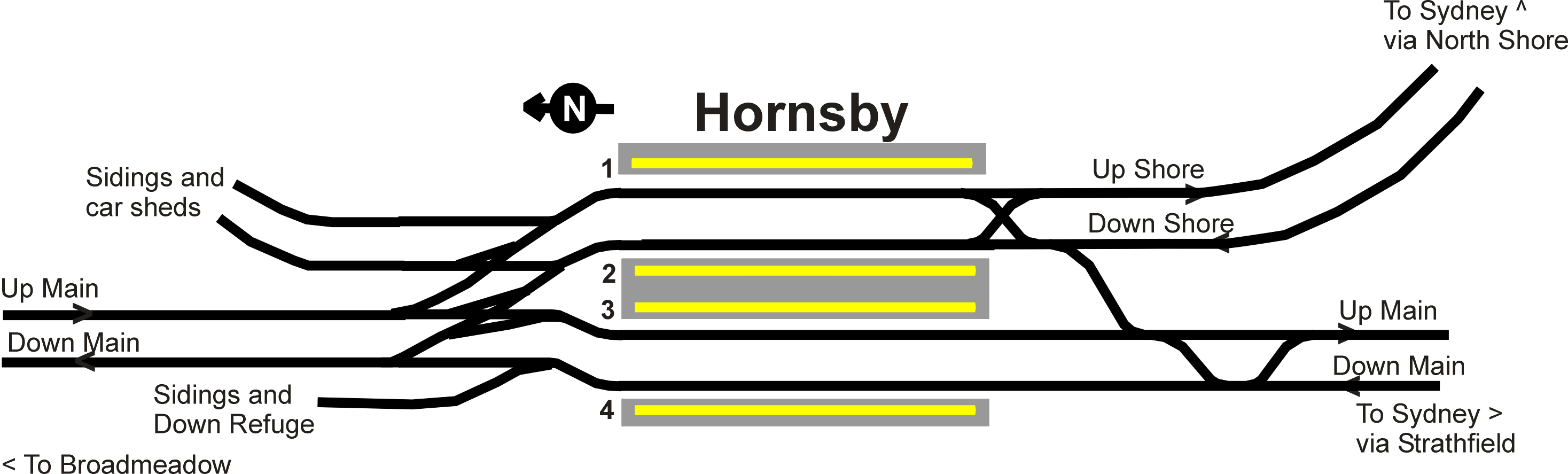
Track layout prior to construction of Platform 5
