= NightRide (bus service) =

Bus network in Sydney, Australia

Overview
- Owner: Transport for NSW
- Locale: Sydney, Australia
- Transit type: Bus
- Number of lines: 16
- Number of stations: 120

Operation
- Began operation: 18 June 1989
- Operators: Busways; CDC NSW; Transit Systems NSW; U-Go Mobility

NightRide is a network of bus routes in operation between midnight and 4.30am in Sydney, Australia. The sixteen routes allow for a nightly shutdown of the Sydney Trains suburban rail network and Sydney Metro. The NightRide network was established in mid-1989 as low-patronage late-night train services were progressively withdrawn.

Services follow major roads, and some stops are some distance from the railway stations they replace. In addition, some routes serve stations on multiple railway lines. In the city, most services depart from Park Street, above Town Hall station. Normal bus fares apply to NightRide journeys.

== History ==
The first NightRide routes, to Riverwood, Campbelltown and Sutherland, commenced in June 1989. Services to Penrith, Hornsby and Cronulla began two months later. New services were introduced to Bondi Junction in 2009; and Carlingford and Richmond in 2011.

A city loop route, called N1, was established in 2000 and cancelled two years later.

The suspension of train services overnight allows for maintenance to occur on tracks. Passengers reportedly feel safer on buses than mostly-empty trains late at night. However, in 2014, it was reported that patronage on most NightRide routes was falling. At the same time, the Tourism and Transport Forum called for 24-hour train operations to resume.

New contracts for all routes commenced 1 March 2018 with a number of routes going to different operators. The routes then became normal commuter routes under the administration of Transport for NSW instead of Sydney Trains. Changes included N100 Railway Square to Bondi Junction which commenced in 2009 ceasing, replaced by route N91 in conjunction with frequency changes to some routes.

From 23 August 2020, two additional routes, N31 and N92 were introduced, and all N71 services standardised to operate to Richmond.

== Network ==
Sydney's light rail system is not served by NightRide, with the exception of the Carlingford line section of the Parramatta Light Rail, served by the old NightRide route. As of 2023, the NightRide network operations are as listed below:

Route	Origin/destination	Replaces	Operator	First Introduced
N10	Town Hall to Sutherland	T4 Eastern Suburbs & Illawarra Line	U-Go Mobility	1989
N11	Town Hall to Cronulla	T4 Eastern Suburbs & Illawarra Line	U-Go Mobility	1989
N20	Town Hall to Riverwood via Sydney Airport	T8 Airport & South Line	U-Go Mobility	1989
N30	Town Hall to Macarthur	T8 Airport & South Line	Transit Systems NSW	1989
N31	Liverpool to Leppington	T2 Leppington & Inner West Line T5 Cumberland Line	CDC NSW	2020
N40	Town Hall to East Hills	M1 Metro North West & Bankstown Line T8 Airport & South Line	Transit Systems NSW	1989
N50	Town Hall to Liverpool	T3 Liverpool & Inner West Line	CDC NSW	1989
N60	Town Hall to Fairfield	T2 Leppington & Inner West Line T5 Cumberland Line	CDC NSW	1989
N61	Town Hall to Carlingford	(Former T6 Carlingford Line)	CDC NSW	2011
N70	Town Hall to Penrith	T1 North Shore & Western Line	CDC NSW	1989
N71	Town Hall to Richmond	T1 North Shore & Western Line T5 Cumberland Line	CDC NSW	2011
N80	Town Hall to Hornsby via Strathfield	T9 Northern Line	Busways	1989
N81	Town Hall to Parramatta via Olympic Park	T1 North Shore & Western Line Olympic Park railway line	Busways	2018
N90	Town Hall to Hornsby via Chatswood	T1 North Shore & Western Line	Busways	1989
N91	Town Hall to Macquarie Park	M1 Metro North West & Bankstown Line T1 North Shore & Western Line	Busways	2018
N92	Town Hall to Tallawong	M1 Metro North West & Bankstown Line	CDC NSW	2020

Note: Routes N61 and N81 operate early morning on Friday, Saturday and Sunday only.
