= Marayong railway station =

Railway station in Sydney, New South Wales, Australia

Marayong
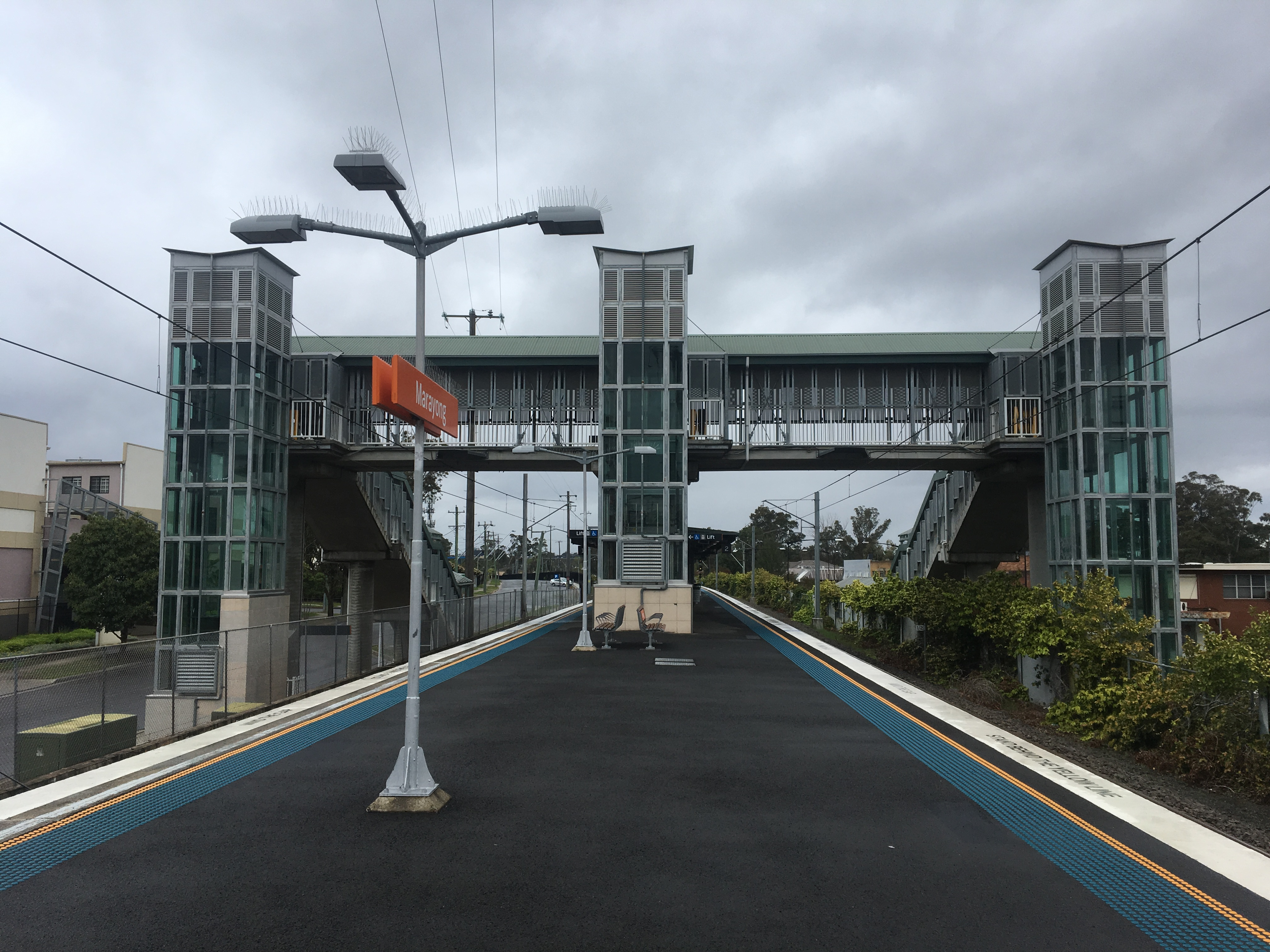
- Southbound view showing station building and entrance, October 2018

General information
- Location: Railway Road, Marayong; Sydney, New South Wales; Australia
- Coordinates: 33°44′46″S 150°54′01″E
- Elevation: 42 metres (138 ft)
- Owner: Transport Asset Manager of New South Wales
- Operator: Sydney Trains
- Line: Richmond
- Distance: 37.41 km (23.25 mi) from Central
- Platforms: 2 (1 island)
- Tracks: 2
- Connections: Bus

Construction
- Structure type: Ground
- Accessible: Yes

Other information
- Status: Staffed
- Station code: MYG
- Website: Transport for NSW

History
- Opened: 2 October 1922 (104 years ago)
- Electrified: Yes (since June 1975)

Passengers
- 2025: 522,742 (year); 1,432 (daily) (Sydney Trains)
- Rank: 159

Services
Preceding station	Sydney Trains	Following station
Quakers Hill towards Richmond	North Shore & Western Line	Blacktown towards Berowra
Quakers Hill towards Richmond	Cumberland Line	Blacktown towards Leppington
Location

Marayong railway station is a suburban railway station located on the Richmond line, serving the Sydney suburb of Marayong. It is served by Sydney Trains T1 Western Line and T5 Cumberland Line services.

== History ==
Marayong station opened on 2 October 1922. The line between Marayong and Quakers Hill was duplicated in 2002 and Marayong station was upgraded the following year.

== Services ==
=== Platforms ===
Platform	Line	Stopping pattern	Notes
1	North Shore & Western Line	services to North Sydney or Hornsby via Central	
1	Cumberland Line	services to Liverpool & Leppington	
2	North Shore & Western Line	services to Schofields & Richmond	
2	Cumberland Line	services to Schofields & Richmond	

=== Transport links ===
Marayong station is served by one NightRide route:

- N71: Richmond station to Town Hall station
