= Riverstone railway station =

Railway station in Sydney, New South Wales, Australia

Riverstone
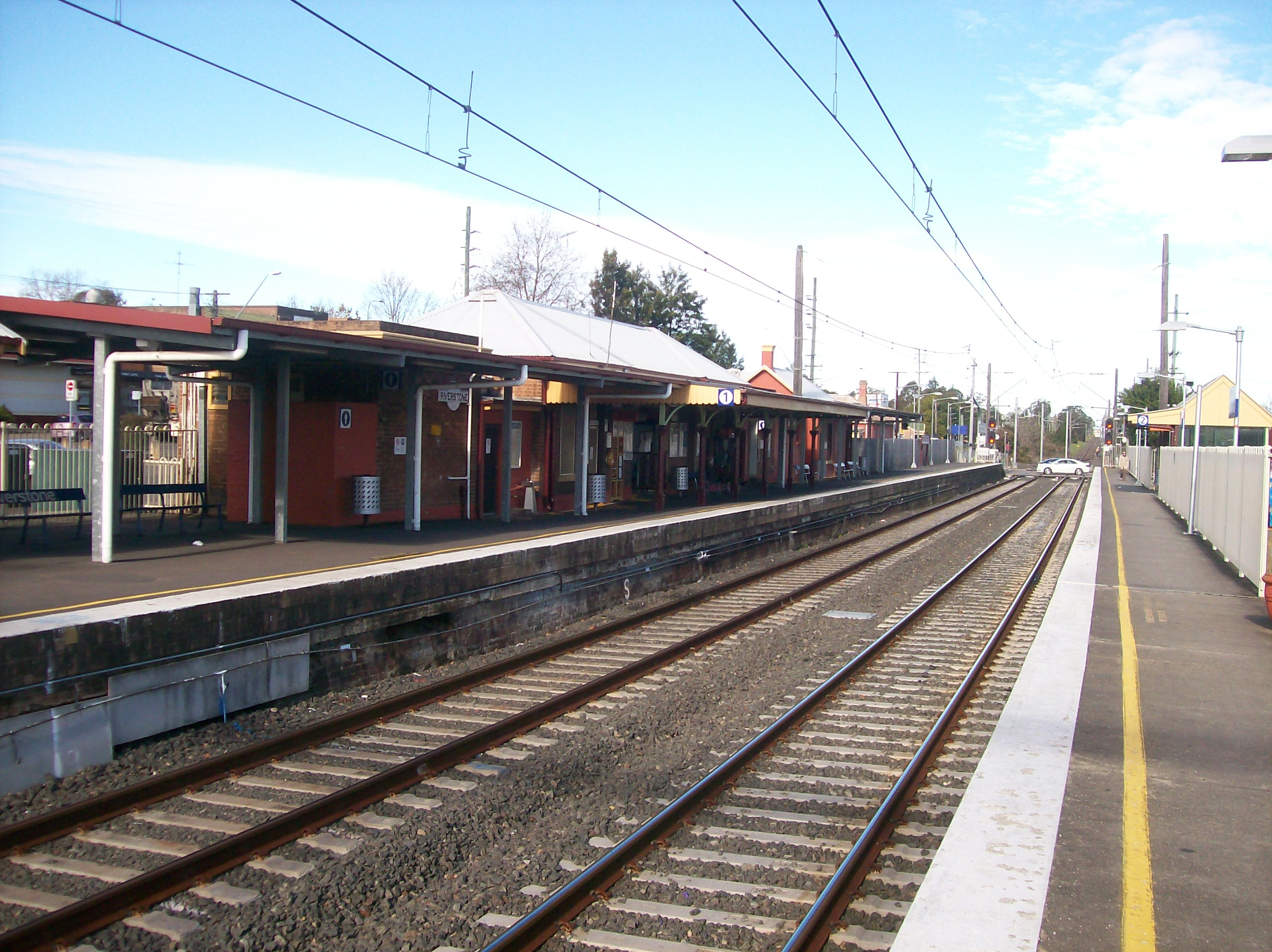
- Eastbound view from Platform 2 in July 2012

General information
- Location: Riverstone Parade, Riverstone; Sydney, New South Wales; Australia
- Coordinates: 33°40′45″S 150°51′37″E
- Elevation: 16 metres (52 ft)
- Owner: Transport Asset Manager of New South Wales
- Operator: Sydney Trains
- Line: Richmond
- Distance: 45.96 km (28.56 mi) from Central
- Platforms: 2 (2 side)
- Tracks: 3
- Connections: Bus

Construction
- Structure type: Ground
- Accessible: Assisted

Other information
- Status: Staffed
- Station code: RVS
- Website: Transport for NSW

History
- Opened: 1 December 1864 (161 years ago)
- Electrified: Yes (from June 1975)

Passengers
- 2025: 632,059 (year); 1,732 (daily) (Sydney Trains)
- Rank: 147

Services
Preceding station	Sydney Trains	Following station
Vineyard towards Richmond	North Shore & Western Line	Schofields towards Berowra
Vineyard towards Richmond	Cumberland Line Late night services only	Schofields towards Leppington
Location

Riverstone railway station is a heritage-listed suburban railway station located on the Richmond line, serving the Sydney suburb of Riverstone. It is served by Sydney Trains' T1 Western Line and T5 Cumberland Line services. It was designed by the NSW Government Railways and William Weaver and built from 1883 to 1939. The property was added to the New South Wales State Heritage Register on 2 April 1999.

== History ==
Two routes to Windsor were proposed in 1846 for the introduction of railways into the colony of New South Wales. The line was built as the first line to be operated as a horse-drawn tramway. In 1856 a petition for the establishment of a railway from the residents of Windsor and Richmond had been presented to the Government. In 1860 a grant of £57,000 was approved for a railway between Blacktown and Windsor. In the following year it was increased to £60,000 for a railway between Blacktown and Richmond.

The route of the railway line between Blacktown and Richmond was surveyed in 1862, with construction commencing late in that year. The engineer for the project was William Weaver (1828–1868), a former Colonial Architect of New South Wales. Contracts for earthworks, permanent ways and bridges were let from 1862 to William Randle & G. Gibbons on 11 December 1862. The contract was taken over by Messrs Iredale & McNamara on 28 September 1863.

The Richmond line opened on 29 November 1864 by Governor Sir John Young, 1st Baron Lisgar as a rural branch line in response to the area's success as a farming district and its location at the intersection of two stock routes. A pilot engine was run before all passenger trains for safety. The original stations were Riverstone, Mulgrave, Windsor and Richmond. An upgrade to the track took place in the late nineteenth century. A major upgrading of most stations on the line occurred in the 1880s.

The early decades of the 20th century brought further improvements and upgrades to the line. For example, the establishment of Richmond air-force base in 1925 resulted in increased use of the line. In 1938 congestion at Clarendon railway station caused by a Royal Australian Air Force air show resulted in extensive improvements. All stations were increased to 450 feet and additional facilities were installed at Richmond.

Riverstone station was located on the eastern side of the line with a track layout which included a short platform loop, and a siding for general goods and to serve the local sawmill. In addition to the brick platform, the station included a brick built combined waiting room, station office and living quarters constructed in 1864. In 1879 a siding known as Richards Siding was built to service the abattoirs.

Commencing in 1876, Engineer-in-Chief John Whitton undertook the major upgrading of the branch line. At Riverstone a new station, goods siding and shed, and station master's residence were completed between 1886 and 1889. The present brick platform building was constructed in 1889. From 1889 the original platform building was used as a parcels office and a post office. A c.1880s picture from the cover of Grantham Estate Purchasers' Companion and Guide, Boyd & King, Mitchell Library shows the Riverstone railway layout.

The general waiting room was originally divided into two, the main waiting room and the ladies waiting room. In 1946 it was partly converted into an office and was again altered in 1952. Both original waiting rooms had fireplaces, and a World War I Honour Roll hung over the main waiting room fireplace until the 1970s (when it was removed for restoration and then disappeared).

In 1919, a room was added to the original station building for the post office. By 1944, the post office had vacated the structure, but it continued to be used as a parcels office, with one room dedicated to the storage of bicycles. In recent years, parts of the structure have been removed.

A timber platform was erected on the loop line in 1939. The line to Riverstone was electrified in 1975 and the platform and small structure were renewed. In 2001, canopies were erected on both platforms.

The residence was built at the same time as the new station and replaced the former combined office/residence constructed in 1864. The new Station Master's residence conformed to a pattern that evolved in the 1880s which expressed the front elevation asymmetrically, with a verandah extending only halfway across the front and a projecting master bedroom. The design was consistent with other substantial brick residences in the 1880s. It was one of the last residences erected in brick in the 19th century following the arrival of Chief Commissioner, E. M. G. Eddy. The building has had later skillion-roof additions to the rear and side. Considerable internal alterations have also taken place to most rooms, except the bedrooms.

The signal box was a two-room c.1939 fibro and timber clad building located on the platform. In 1975, a crew amenities building was built at the Richmond end of the platform.

No buildings other than those on the platform and the 1889 residence survive.

The War Memorial (owned by Council) was built in 1919 and designed by George Cook, Manager of the Windsor Branch of E.L. Kingsley & Co., monumental masons, and built by E.L. Kingsley & Co. The memorial has continued to be updated with details of military officials engaged in subsequent campaigns. In many towns, war memorials have been placed in station forecourts and at times on platforms. This occurred because of the paucity of available public land on which memorials could be made. Railway stations were once an important and central component of town life and memorials therefore had a high level of visibility. Additionally, many railway men and women volunteered for service in World Wars I and II and their names would appear on the memorials. This is the case at Riverstone.

On 22 May 1975, Riverstone station became the terminus of the electrified line, with passengers changing to CPH and later 600/700 class railcars for the remainder of the journey to Richmond. On 17 August 1991, the line was electrified to Richmond.

=== Modifications and dates ===
- 1878 – Ticket office erected.
- 1879 – Toilet, signal box and goods siding built; the latter was at the eastern end of the platform
- 1919 – a room was added to the original station building for the Post office
- 26 July 1923 – Water tank capacity increased to 27kL.
- 1939 – A timber platform was erected on the loop line and Interlocking installed with central operation and Down platform.
- c.1939 – Fibro and timber clad, two room signal box located on the platform.
- 1946 – The General Waiting Room was partly converted into an office and was again altered in 1952; platform and crossing loop extended to 152m long; a * water column provided on the Down side.
- 18 January 1968 – "F" type lights & half-boom gates at Garfield Road level crossing
- 1970s – Honour Roll removed from the main waiting room
- 1975 – A crew amenities building was built at the Richmond end of the platform.
- 1975 – The platform and small structure were renewed.
- 2001 – canopies were erected on both platforms.

== Description ==
The station has a number of historically significant buildings:

- Platform 1 Station Building – type 3, second-class (1889)
- Signal Box – type P (1939)
- Platform 1 Store and Shelter (c. 1939)
- Parcels Office (1919)
- Platform 2 Shelter – aluminium (c. 1980s)
- Station master's residence (1883) (22 Garfield Rd – cnr. Riverstone Parade)

It also has a number of historically significant structures:

- Platform 1 – roadside, brick faced (1860s–89)
- Platform 2 – roadside, concrete block (c. 1980s)
- Former Goods Yard
- War memorial – (1919) (Council owned)
- Signs – timber station name board (Council owned)

=== Platform 1 Station Building (1889) ===
The station building on Platform 1 is composed of a number of buildings. The first is a single storey, c. 1880s face brick symmetrical building with two flanking, parapeted wings, which includes a central waiting room with office on one side and the former ladies waiting room on the other, connecting to toilets in the eastern wing. The western wing is the former lamp room. The wings are linked to the main building by small, flat roofed rooms. The roadside elevation is fronted by an ogee profile timber and iron framed verandah between two projecting wings, while on the rail side there is a cast iron fluted column and metal framed awning with decorative brackets. The roadside faces the motor traffic forecourt which swings around the war memorial. Connected to the eastern end of the main building is a brick building under the same flat roof as the more modern shops that face the road behind it. This is linked to the previously free standing, original ticket office.

Internally, the building has been refurbished except for elements such as timber joinery for doors and windows, wall vents and the enclosed fireplace. Tiles in the waiting room, most ceilings and other items have been replaced.

=== Signal Box (1939) ===
On the western side of the main building are two detached buildings. The first is the signal box linked to the main building via a shallow roofed metal shelter. It is a fibro-sheet and weatherboard signal box with corrugated metal gabled roof and concrete base. It is a reasonably large box and an unusual building of later design. The original levers have been removed and only a new signalling board remains. The signal box was closed in 1999.

=== Platform 1 Store and Shelter (c. 1939) ===
The second detached building further to the west of the signal box is a store of similar construction. Further west again is an open passenger shelter with butterfly style corrugated metal awning supported on steel columns and beams. A central steel framed panelled partition divides the both sides of the shelter.

=== Parcels Office (1919) ===
External: The parcels office is a painted brick building with corrugated steel hipped roof featuring two segmental arched tall windows in the centre and two doors (one segmental arched original timber door with fanlight, and the other metal later door) on either side of the platform elevation. There are no other openings on the building. Windows are double-hung with multi-paned upper sash.

=== Platform 2 Shelter (c. 1980s) ===
This shelter is an aluminium framed structure with glass sides and colorbond gable roof extending as an awning on the platform side.

=== Station Master's Residence (c. 1889) ===
This is a large single storey c. 1889 brick Station Master's residence with hipped and pitched corrugated metal roof, a projecting bay and corrugated iron veranda at the front. The veranda is supported on slender timber chamfered posts. It has a later lean to addition in fibro to the side and a timber lean to at the rear. The building is face brick, partly painted and has two brick chimneys with dentilated and corbelled tops. The residence is currently vacant and reflects its recent conversion into a number of units. Most of its original internal elements including fireplace surrounds and ceilings have been removed and damaged. The original timber moulded window and door frames as well as some moulded timber skirting survive. Damaged paling timber fencing along the Riverstone Parade boundary of the property has recently been replaced by timber picket fence together with new timber paling fencing along the platform side of the boundary. The building fronts Garfield Road West and features metal standard railway fencing on this boundary.

It is a Type 7 (J3) residence. This is a moderately common type, as 13-15 examples exist. It is in poor condition, but is a robust structure. There are building code and disability access issues to be overcome for commercial reuse. However, it is in a prominent position and otherwise has good commercial reuse potential, particularly due to the large backyard.

The station master's residence has had later skillion-roof additions to the rear and side. Considerable internal alterations have also taken place to most rooms, except the bedrooms.

=== Platform 1 (1860s–89) ===
The eastern platform is brick faced road side construction raised by five courses above the original 1860s sandstone topped platform. The sandstone topping extends from the precast concrete store building at the northern end to adjacent to the cottage/ticket office at the southern end of the station.

=== Platform 2 (c. 1980s) ===
On west side of the track is a concrete platform.

=== Former Goods Yard ===
The former goods yard has largely been demolished. The only remaining evidence is the rails and timber buffer. A small, recent brick and colorbond shed is also located on the site.

The corrugated iron per way shed and c.1889 goods shed were removed at an unknown date. This was a 21 x 14 side shed with no awning, a central pair of sliding doors and a window on each side with door and window at one end with separate flight of stairs. The platform extended from the doors to an extended platform to the north with sloped end. The building was simple corrugated iron clad with windows in small Victorian pattern panes. The barge boards were shaped and the eaves construction was elaborate for the use as goods shed indicating an early non-standard building.

The Gangers Hut was also removed at an unknown date. This was an excellent example of an early gangers hut located with a group of buildings, clad in corrugated iron.

=== War memorial ===
Designed by George Cook, manager of the Windsor Branch of E.L. Kingsley & Co., monumental masons, built by E.L. Kingsley & Co. A stone obelisk mounted on a stone base with curb, small gate and small shrubs around the base. The plaque is marble and two rifles are carved into the stone at the front. The entire monument is sited in a paved road island with bollards.

The war memorial has been updated with details of military officials engaged in subsequent campaigns.

=== Platform signs ===
The timber platform signs supported on timber posts are intact examples of early station signs that are rapidly diminishing.

=== Moveable heritage ===
The station retains a Seth Thomas Clock, which was in the process of being repaired and restored at the time of inspection in January 2009.

=== Potential archaeological features ===
There is a potential within the former goods yard for likely surviving elements that are not visible at this time.

=== Condition ===
As at 29 January 2015, the station buildings were reported to be in very good condition, both inside and outside. The station master's residence was in very poor condition, particularly internally. All interiors of the residence appear to have been damaged by fire and vandalism. The residence suffers significantly from rising damp possibly due to painting of external walls. It requires urgent repair and maintenance works.

The siding area on the southern side of the station may contain some archaeological remnants.

The station buildings are of high integrity and remain intact. The Station Master's residence has moderate integrity and has lost its intactness. The overall integrity of the station has been relatively reduced by the removal of the 1864 original station building.

== Services ==
=== Platforms ===
Historically, Riverstone has been served by services operating from Sydney CBD/North Shore, branching off the Western Line at Blacktown. However, after a major timetable change for the Sydney Trains network on 26 November 2017, Cumberland line services started continuing out to Richmond, rather than terminating at Schofields, during the late night, taking over from the Richmond line at these times.

Platform	Line	Stopping pattern	Notes
1	North Shore & Western Line	services to Lindfield or North Sydney via Central	
1	Cumberland Line	services to Leppington	
2	North Shore & Western Line	services to Richmond	
2	Cumberland Line	services to Richmond	

=== Transport links ===
Busways operates seven bus routes via Riverstone station, under contract to Transport for NSW:

Riverstone Pde:

- 671: to Windsor station via McGraths Hill
- 734: to Blacktown station via Schofields and Stanhope Gardens
- 741: to Maraylya via Scheyville
- 742: to Rouse Hill
- 746: to Box Hill
- 747: Marsden Park to Rouse Hill

Riverstone station is served by one NightRide route:

- N71: Richmond station to City (Town Hall)

== Heritage listing ==
Riverstone Station is significant as part of the original construction phase of the Richmond line in the 1860s that provided access to the settlements on the Hawkesbury River and the markets of Sydney. The station probably influenced the establishment of the meatworks at Riverstone by Benjamin Richards in 1878 and it retains the complex of structures associated with the major upgrading works of the Richmond branch line that commenced during the 1880s by the Engineer-in-Chief, John Whitton. The 1889 station building retains much of its original detailing and is intact. The overall integrity of the station has been relatively reduced by the removal of the original 1860s station building, and only part of the early platform remains from this period. Notwithstanding, the station group is a key element in the townscape of Riverstone providing the interface between the railway line and the historic Riverstone Township subdivision of 1877.

The former Station Master's residence is significant as a representative example of a late-nineteenth century Station Master's residence constructed in brick. The construction of the building is associated with the former prominence of the railway in Riverstone, brought about by the development of the meatworks. The building is centrally located in the town of Riverstone, however, its landmark qualities have been significantly reduced by the later additions and modifications.

Riverstone railway station was listed on the New South Wales State Heritage Register on 2 April 1999 having satisfied the following criteria.

The place is important in demonstrating the course, or pattern, of cultural or natural history in New South Wales.

Riverstone Station is historically significant as physical evidence of the original construction phase of the Richmond line in the 1860s that provided access to the settlements on the Hawkesbury River and the markets of Sydney. The station probably influenced the establishment of the meatworks at Riverstone by Benjamin Richards in 1878. The station retains the complex of 1880s structures associated with the major upgrading works of the Richmond branch line by the Engineer-in-Chief, John Whitton. The station group is a key element in the townscape of Riverstone providing the interface between the railway line and the historic Riverstone township subdivision of 1877.

The construction of the Station Master's residence (as part of a general upgrade) in the 1880s demonstrates the importance of the Riverstone goods and freight traffic to the New South Wales Government Railways.

The place is important in demonstrating aesthetic characteristics and/or a high degree of creative or technical achievement in New South Wales.

The 1880s to 1940s upgrades of the station complex are good representative examples of railway civil engineering practice for their respective periods. The main 1889 station building is a good example of second class station buildings featuring typical characteristics of this design including symmetrical face brick main building flanked with two parapeted wings planned around a central waiting room.

The Station Master's residence was a good example of a government institutional residence in brick of the late nineteenth century, retaining original features such as window and door fenestration, verandah, and brick chimneys. However, later fibro and timber lean-to additions as well as removal of almost all internal finishes and decorative elements has reduced significantly its aesthetic and architectural quality.

The place has a strong or special association with a particular community or cultural group in New South Wales for social, cultural or spiritual reasons.

The place has the potential to contribute to the local community's sense of place, and can provide a connection to the local community's past.

The place has potential to yield information that will contribute to an understanding of the cultural or natural history of New South Wales.

The Riverstone Station has high research potential in providing evidence of a complex of station structures built in the 1860s through the late 1880s.

The place possesses uncommon, rare or endangered aspects of the cultural or natural history of New South Wales.

The station contains rare examples of mid 1860s railway civil engineering practice, namely the station platform (part).

The place is important in demonstrating the principal characteristics of a class of cultural or natural places/environments in New South Wales.

Riverstone Station is a representative example of station layout of the late 19th century including station buildings, residence, parcels office and signal box; and has representative significance for demonstrating widespread 19th Century railway customs, activities and design in NSW.
