= East Richmond railway station, Sydney =

Railway station in Sydney, New South Wales, Australia

East Richmond
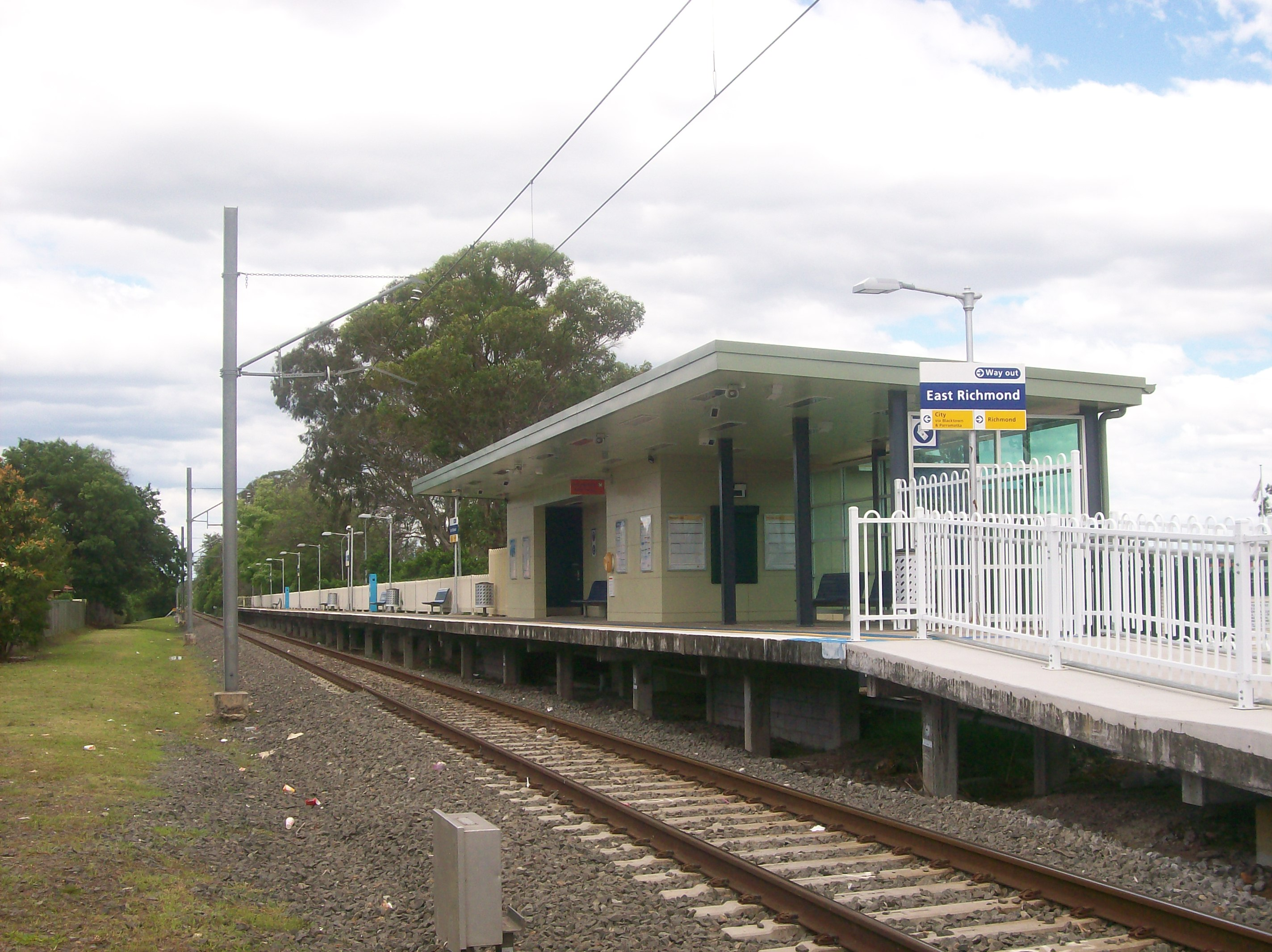
- Eastbound view showing platform building in November 2011

General information
- Location: Bourke Street, Richmond; Sydney, New South Wales; Australia
- Coordinates: 33°36′07″S 150°45′35″E
- Elevation: 26 metres (85 ft)
- Owner: Transport Asset Manager of New South Wales
- Operator: Sydney Trains
- Line: Richmond
- Distance: 60.00 km (37.28 mi) from Central
- Platforms: 1 (1 side)
- Tracks: 1
- Connections: Bus

Construction
- Structure type: Ground
- Accessible: Yes

Other information
- Status: Weekdays: Staffed: 6am to 2pm
- Station code: ERD
- Website: Transport for NSW

History
- Opened: 2 July 1939 (87 years ago)
- Electrified: Yes (from August 1991)

Passengers
- 2023: 108,080 (year); 296 (daily) (Sydney Trains, NSW TrainLink)

Services
Preceding station	Sydney Trains	Following station
Richmond Terminus	North Shore & Western Line	Clarendon towards Berowra
Richmond Terminus	Cumberland Line Late night services only	Clarendon towards Leppington
Location

East Richmond railway station is a suburban railway station located on the Richmond line, serving the Sydney suburb of Richmond. It is served by Sydney Trains T1 Western Line and T5 Cumberland Line services. It was opened in 1939 as an infill station, the last on the Richmond line.

== History ==
The Richmond railway line had originally opened in 1864, but no station was provided at East Richmond. However, a station at East Richmond to be located at the "Bourke Street Crossing" was first requested as early as mid-1898.

East Richmond station opened on 2 July 1939, as an infill station.

== Services ==
=== Platforms ===
Services to East Richmond operate from either the North Shore or South-West Sydney, branching off the Main Western railway line at Blacktown. Since 26 November 2017, the T1 Western Line serves East Richmond throughout the entirety of the day, except when late night T5 Cumberland Line services continue to Richmond, rather than terminating at Schofields.

Platform	Line	Stopping pattern	Notes
1	T1	services to Lindfield or North Sydney via Central services to Richmond	
1	T5	services to Leppington services to Richmond	

=== Transport links ===
East Richmond station is served by one NightRide route:

Bourke Street:

- N71: Richmond station to Town Hall station
