= Windsor railway station, Sydney =

Railway station in Sydney, New South Wales, Australia

Windsor
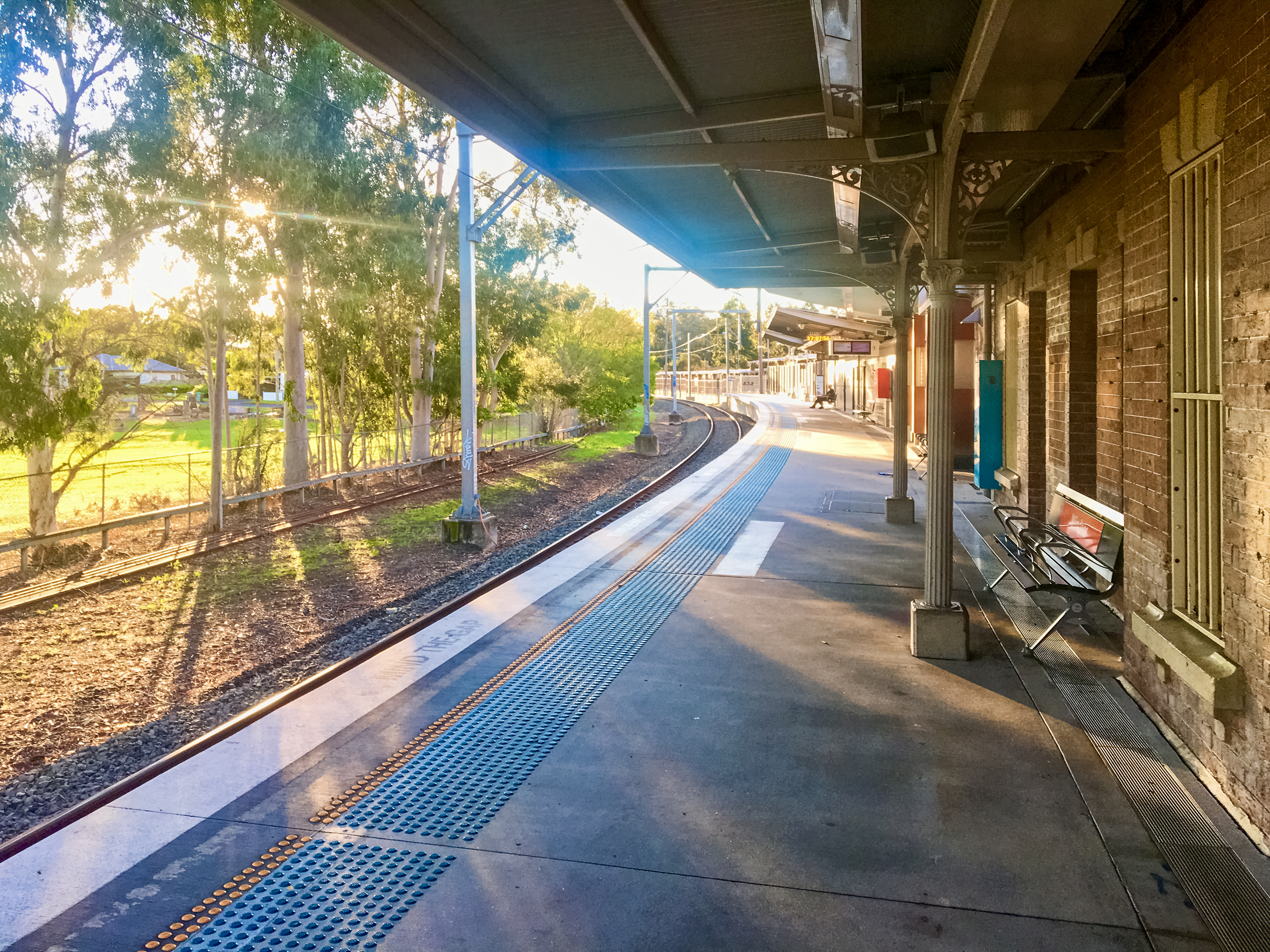
- Station platform building and shelter in September 2020

General information
- Location: George Street, Windsor; Sydney, New South Wales; Australia
- Coordinates: 33°36′50″S 150°48′39″E
- Elevation: 19 metres (62 ft)
- Owner: Transport Asset Manager of New South Wales
- Operator: Sydney Trains
- Line: Richmond
- Distance: 54.98 km (34.16 mi) from Central
- Platforms: 1 (1 side)
- Tracks: 1
- Connections: Bus

Construction
- Structure type: Ground
- Accessible: Yes

Other information
- Status: Weekdays: Staffed: 6am to 2pm: Weekends and public holidays: Unstaffed
- Station code: WSR
- Website: Transport for NSW

History
- Opened: 1 December 1864 (161 years ago)
- Electrified: Yes (from August 1991)

Passengers
- 2023: 360,180 (year); 987 (daily) (Sydney Trains, NSW TrainLink)

Services
Preceding station	Sydney Trains	Following station
Clarendon towards Richmond	North Shore & Western Line	Mulgrave towards Berowra
Clarendon towards Richmond	Cumberland Line Late night services only	Mulgrave towards Leppington
Location

Windsor railway station is a heritage-listed suburban railway station located on the Richmond line, serving the Sydney suburb of Windsor. It is served by Sydney Trains T1 Western Line and T5 Cumberland Line services. The property was added to the New South Wales State Heritage Register on 2 April 1999.

== History ==
Windsor station opened on 1 December 1864 coinciding with that of the Richmond line. It was constructed by W & A Elphinstone. The original station building was a combination residence and office, as were built at Riverstone railway station and Mulgrave railway station on the same line. This was purchased and relocated to be converted into a private home in Milhelm Street.

A major upgrade of most stations on the line occurred in the 1880s, including Windsor. In April 1883 the contract for a brick station building and platform was awarded to G. Jones. The station was rebuilt with the goods yard including the brick faced platform. The present brick platform building dates from 1884 and its design reflects similar buildings at Riverstone and Richmond.

A skillion roof and timber clad signal box constructed c. 1916 behind the Up end of the platform is no longer extant. A timber and gable roofed ex-goods shed on the down side of the track beyond the down end of the platform was extant in 2001 but is no longer extant.

The line between Riverstone and Richmond was electrified in 1991. Plans show alterations to the station building c. 1941. The platform building was extensively repaired and upgraded in 1997. All platform structures other than the main brick building were removed.

== Services ==
=== Platforms ===
Services to Windsor operate from either the North Shore or South-West Sydney, branching off the Main Western railway line at Blacktown. Since 26 November 2017, the T1 Western Line serves Windsor throughout the entirety of the day, except when late night T5 Cumberland Line services continue to Richmond, rather than terminating at Schofields.

Platform	Line	Stopping pattern	Notes
1	T1	services to Lindfield or North Sydney via Central services to Richmond	
1	T5	services to Leppington services to Richmond	

=== Transport links ===
Busways operates nine bus routes via Windsor station, under contract to Transport for NSW:
Stand A:

- 668: to Richmond station via Freemans Reach & Glossodia
- 671: to Riverstone station via McGraths Hill & Vineyard
- 672: to Pitt Town to Wisemans Ferry Punt
- 673: to Penrith station via Llandilo
- 674: to Mount Druitt station via Berkshire Park and Whalan
- 675A: anti-clockwise loop via Richmond & Bligh Park
- 675C: clockwise loop via Bligh Park & Richmond
- 676: to South Windsor
- 679: to Maraylya via Scheyville

CDC NSW operates one bus route via Windsor station, under contract to Transport for NSW:
Stand A

- 608: to Rouse Hill

Windsor station is served by one NightRide route:
Stand B:

- N71: Richmond to Town Hall station

== Description ==
The Windsor station complex consists of a type-3, second-class roadside brick station building with a brick-faced platform (both 1883). The goods yard contains a brick-faced platform, class 1, 5 tonne iron Philadelphia jib crane (1880s), modern steel framed, corrugated metal sheds (c. 1990), and a Corrugated metal gabled gangers shed with timber frame (c. 1883).

=== Station building and platform (1883) ===
The Windsor station building is a large face-brick building in what is known as a type 3 second class roadside sign. It is a symmetrically organised central building with two wings attached to either side. The Down side wing is a rectangular larger building while the Up end wing is almost a square building. The central building features a hipped and valley slate roof, two tall brick chimneys with corbelled tops and round hoods, moulded and dentilated eaves, a corrugated iron ogee style veranda along the street side of the central building, and a wide corrugated metal platform awning supported on cast iron columns, exposed rafters and decorative brackets. Wings feature flat roofs obscured behind low parapets and moulded cornices. The building's vertically proportioned fenestration is original with cement rendered lintels resembling segmental stone arch appearance.

The building retains much of its internal original elements including moulded plaster cornices, timber skirtings, fireplace (blocked), mini orb ceiling lining in the office and timber joinery. The overall historic character of the interiors are evident despite the changes and refurbishments over time.

The station building is generally in very good condition.

Windsor station has a brick faced road side platform with concrete deck and asphalt finish. White aluminium palisade fencing has been erected along the station street boundary and both ends of the platform. Modern platform furniture, bins, light fittings and signage also feature along the platform.

=== Goods yard ===
The yard is a large, irregularly shaped site that is fenced and contains remnants of the 19th century Windsor station goods yard. It is an overgrown yard with patches of concrete and asphalt slabs and remnants of rail sidings and anchor points on the ground.

Remnants of the former curved brick faced goods platform are evident under the overgrown vegetation and rubble. An original 1880s goods crane fixed on an octagonal concrete base is the only intact extant element of the former goods yard. It is an iron jib crane with a hook dropping from the end of a single rotating arm. The crane is a Class 1, 5 tonne hand crane, No T181.

There are three modern steel framed sheds within the goods yard; One is a large corrugated metal sheeted and gabled shed, with two identical metal sheeted small sheds behind it.

Located beyond the fenced area of the goods yard, the gangers shed is a timber-framed gabled shed with corrugated metal wall and roof sheeting. It features timber floorboards, timber roof trusses, timber sliding loading doors, and wire mesh covered windows. The gangers shed is in poor condition both internally and externally. Only roof sheeting appears to be new fabric and is in good condition.

Notable moveable items include:

- A Seth Thomas Clock (# 1886), working condition, in the ticket office.
- Two timber L-shaped/corner seats in the waiting room.
- An enamel station name board with timber frame on the platform side of the station building.
- An Ajax brand safe (#1004) in the SM's office.

The former goods yard has high archaeological potential due to the extent of remnant rail sidings, anchor points and former goods platform dating to the first railway.

The goods yard is in relatively poor condition due to overgrown vegetation and patches of rubble storage.

=== Modifications and dates ===
- 1883 – The station was rebuilt with the goods yard including the brick faced platform and Type 1 jib crane.
- 15 January 1890 – Water column from Mudgee re-erected.
- c.1916 – A skillion roof and timber clad signal box constructed behind the Up end of the platform (no longer extant).
- 33 July 1939 – Platform extended.
- 1943 – Alterations to station buildings and offices completed.
- 1945 – Raising platform height; and providing asphalt strip and brick coping.
- 28 September 1975 – Hawkesbury Dairy siding removed.
- 1997 – The platform building was extensively repaired and upgraded. All platform structures other than the main brick building were removed.
- 1991 – The line was electrified.
- unknown date – Station Master's residence sold to private ownership (to north of Station on Brabyn Street)

== Heritage listing ==
Windsor Railway Station is of state significance as one of the stations built during the major upgrading works along the Richmond line in the 1880s providing evidence of the prosperity, and social and economic development of the Windsor area following the arrival of the railway during the 19th Century. The 1883 station building is a fine example of a Victorian second-class station building and is a significant landmark within the historic town centre. The goods yard is of research significance for its potential to yield information on the operational system and layout of the late 19th century goods handling through the remnants of rail sidings, brick faced platform, hand crane and anchor points. However, its integrity has been compromised due to the removal of the majority of its associated structures and its non-operational state.

Windsor railway station was listed on the New South Wales State Heritage Register on 2 April 1999 having satisfied the following criteria.

The place is important in demonstrating the course, or pattern, of cultural or natural history in New South Wales.

Windsor Station is historically significant as one of the stations built during the major upgrading works along Richmond line in the 1880s, maintaining physical evidence of a station layout including a goods yard dating from the early 1880s. Although buildings other than the main station building have been removed the station together with the hand crane and brick faced platform of the goods yard are important in demonstrating the configuration, styles and elements that were used in the goods handling and transport in the farming district of the Hawkesbury at the time.

The place is important in demonstrating aesthetic characteristics and/or a high degree of creative or technical achievement in New South Wales.

Constructed in 1883, the station building is aesthetically significant as a fine example of a Victorian second-class road side station building providing evidence of the prosperity, and social and economic development of the Windsor area. The building is a landmark within the historic town centre.

The place has a strong or special association with a particular community or cultural group in New South Wales for social, cultural or spiritual reasons.

The place has the potential to contribute to the local community's sense of place, and can provide a connection to the local community's past.

The place has potential to yield information that will contribute to an understanding of the cultural or natural history of New South Wales.

The goods yard has potential to yield information on the operational system and layout of late 19th century goods handling through the remnants of rail sidings, the brick faced platform, crane and anchor points. The extent of surviving remnant elements warrant brief archaeological investigation.

The place possesses uncommon, rare or endangered aspects of the cultural or natural history of New South Wales.

Windsor Station combined with its associated goods yard is a rare example of an 1880s railway station layout despite being modified and the majority of the structures removed.

The place is important in demonstrating the principal characteristics of a class of cultural or natural places/environments in New South Wales.

Windsor Station is one of three stations (others Richmond and Riverstone) incorporating larger station buildings built on the Richmond line in the 1880s that differ significantly from other smaller and simpler stations on the line. The station building is a fine example of a late nineteenth century second-class station building representing the peak of achievement in station architecture.
