= Quakers Hill railway station =

Railway station in Sydney, New South Wales, Australia

Quakers Hill
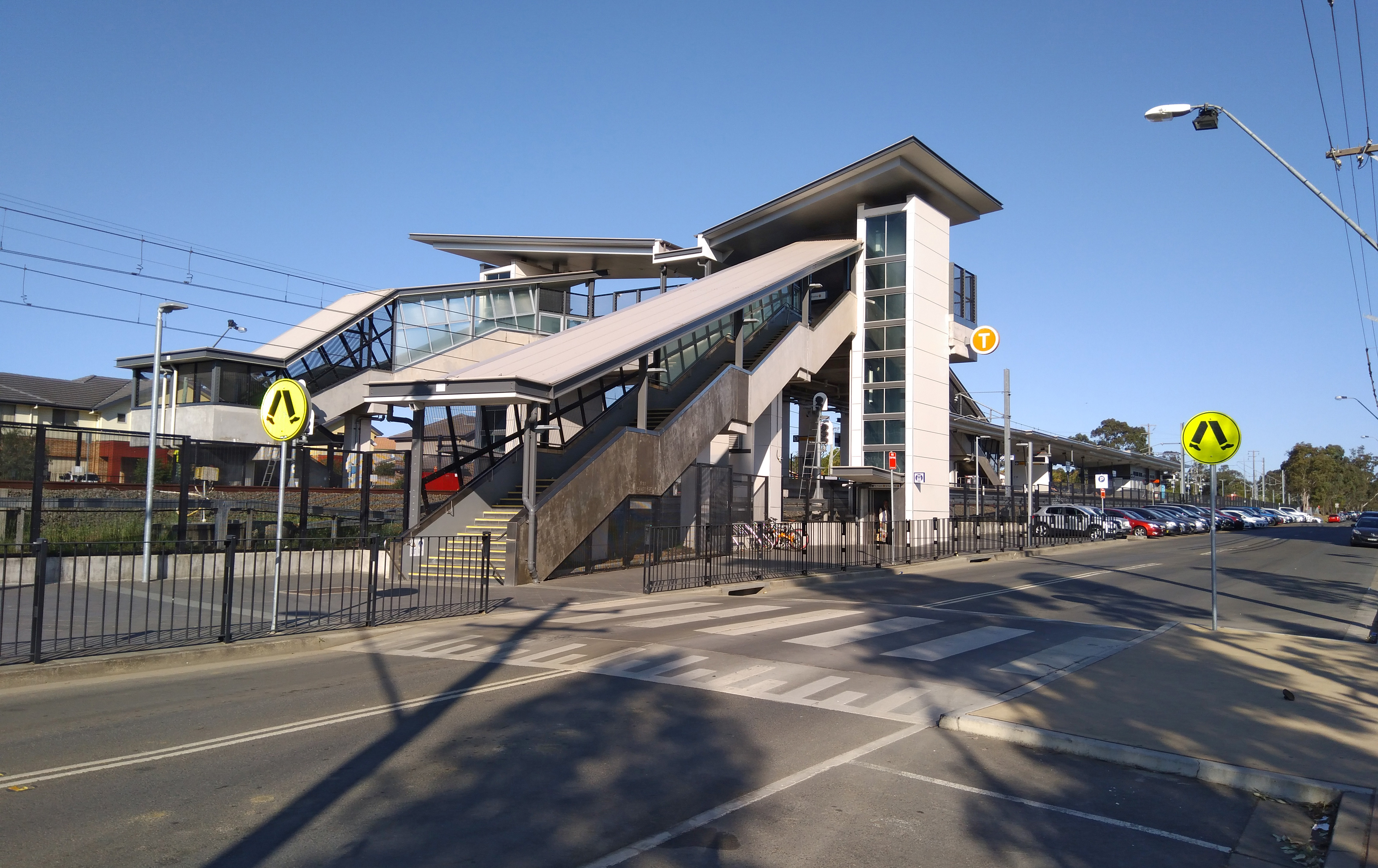
- Station building and entrance in September 2017

General information
- Location: Railway Road, Quakers Hill; Sydney, New South Wales; Australia
- Coordinates: 33°43′41″S 150°53′12″E
- Elevation: 34 metres (112 ft)
- Owner: Transport Asset Manager of New South Wales
- Operator: Sydney Trains
- Line: Richmond
- Distance: 40.09 km (24.91 mi) from Central
- Platforms: 2 (1 island)
- Tracks: 2
- Connections: Bus

Construction
- Structure type: Ground
- Accessible: Yes

Other information
- Status: Staffed
- Station code: QKH
- Website: Transport for NSW

History
- Opened: 1872 (154 years ago)
- Rebuilt: 29 June 1939 (87 years ago)
- Electrified: Yes (since June 1975)
- Former names: Douglas Siding (1872–1905)

Passengers
- 2025: 1,239,789 (year); 3,397 (daily) (Sydney Trains)
- Rank: 112

Services
Preceding station	Sydney Trains	Following station
Schofields towards Richmond	North Shore & Western Line	Marayong towards Berowra
Schofields towards Richmond	Cumberland Line	Marayong towards Leppington
Location

Quakers Hill railway station is a suburban railway station located on the Richmond line, serving the Sydney suburb of Quakers Hill. It is served by Sydney Trains T1 Western Line and T5 Cumberland Line services.

== History ==
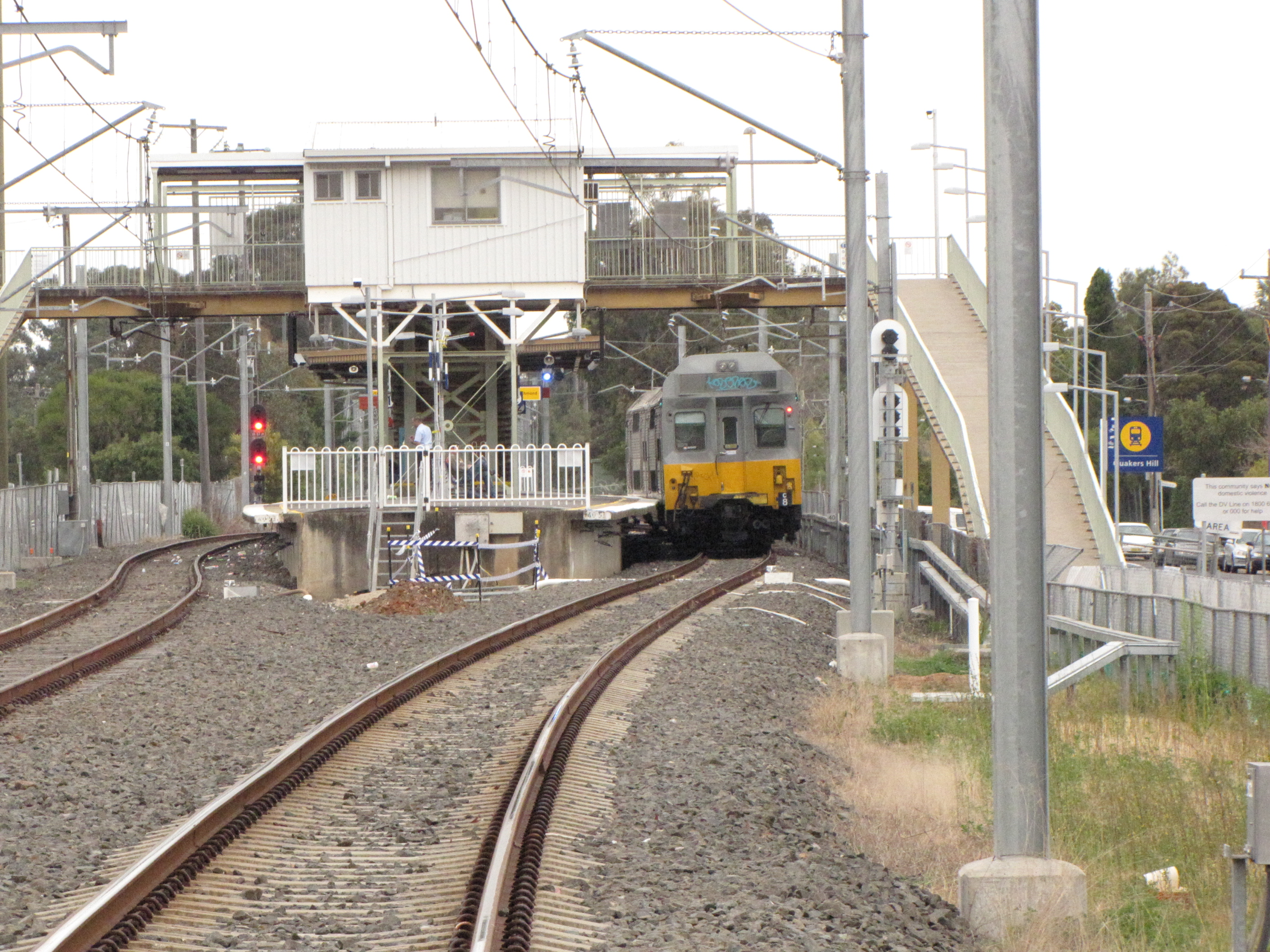
The former footbridge at the station

Quakers Hill station opened in 1872 as Douglas Siding. It was renamed Quakers Hill on 30 March 1905 and relocated to its present location on 29 June 1939. Two sets of points at the southern end of the station allow trains to terminate on either platform.

The station had a crossing loop until the line from Marayong was duplicated to Quakers Hill in 2002. In 2011, the second track was extended to Schofields with a new overhead concourse with lists completed at the same time. As a result, T5 Cumberland line services were extended to terminate at Schofields.

== Services ==
=== Platforms ===
During the week, Quakers Hill has four services an hour in both directions. Two of these services come from the city while the other two run between Schofields and Leppington. In the peak, Quakers Hill is serviced by six services an hour on the T1 Western Line. Late at nights, T1 Western Line services do not run to Quakers Hill and only 2 T5 Cumberland Line services run every hour between Leppington and Richmond.

On the weekends, the T1 Western Line operates a service from Richmond to North Sydney every 30 minutes which stops at Quakers Hill in both directions. Quakers Hill is also serviced by T5 Cumberland Line services on weekends with services running between Schofields and Liverpool.

Platform	Line	Stopping pattern	Notes
1	North Shore & Western Line	services to North Sydney or Hornsby via Central	
1	Cumberland Line	services to Liverpool & Leppington	
2	North Shore & Western Line	services to Schofields & Richmond	
2	Cumberland Line	services to Schofields & Richmond	

=== Transport links ===
Busways operates two bus routes via Quakers Hill station, under contract to Transport for NSW:

Pearce Rd:

- 732: Rouse Hill Station to Blacktown station via Schofields and Acacia Gardens
- 752: Rouse Hill Station to Blacktown station via The Ponds

Quakers Hill station is served by one NightRide route:

Railway Rd:

- N71: Richmond station to City (Town Hall)
