= Vineyard railway station =

Railway station in Sydney, New South Wales, Australia

Vineyard
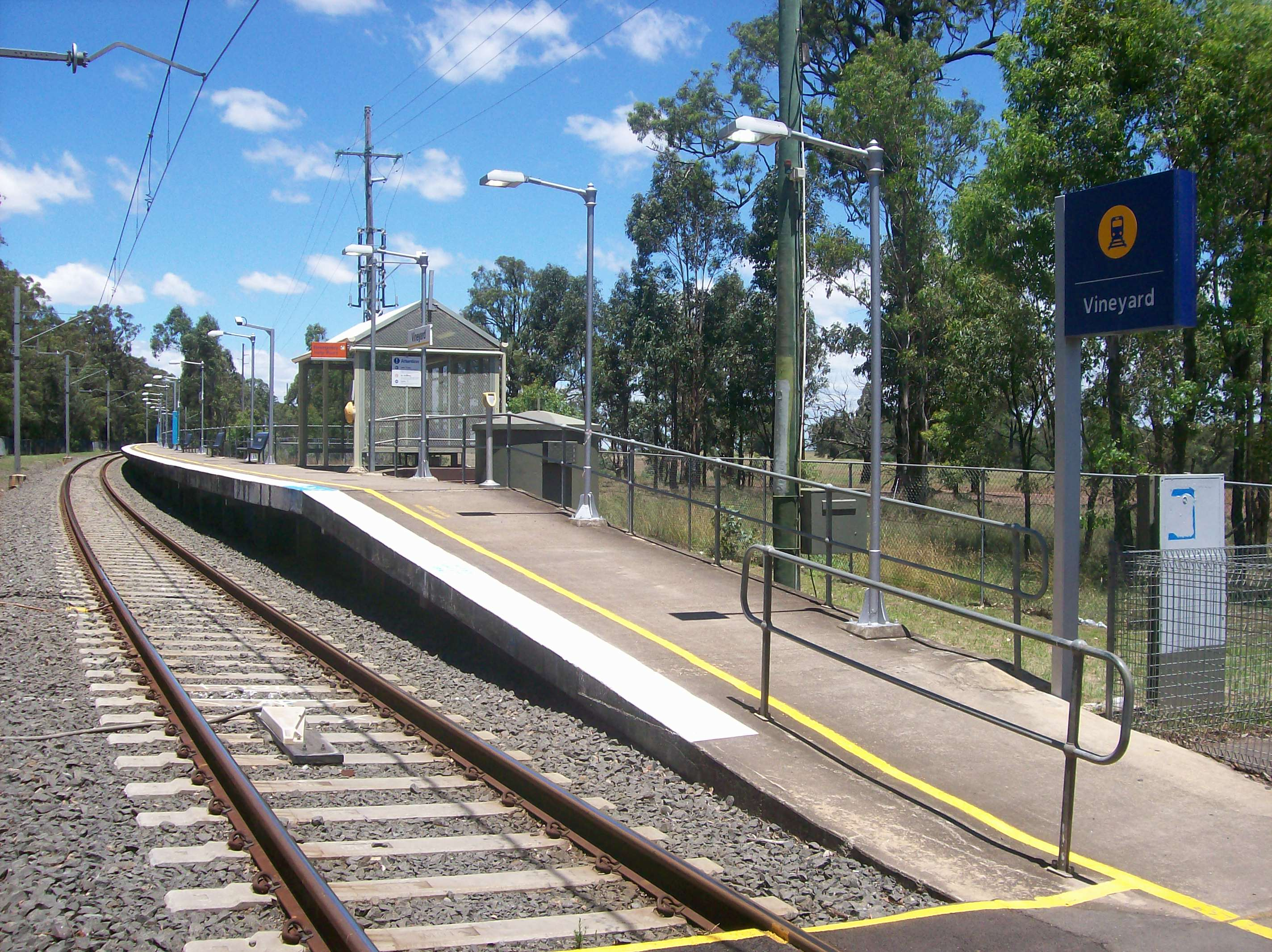
- Eastbound view of platform from the entrance in November 2011

General information
- Location: Riverstone Parade, Vineyard; Sydney, New South Wales; Australia
- Coordinates: 33°39′04″S 150°51′04″E
- Elevation: 35 metres (115 ft)
- Owner: Transport Asset Manager of New South Wales
- Operator: Sydney Trains
- Line: Richmond
- Distance: 49.23 km (30.59 mi) from Central
- Platforms: 1 (1 side)
- Tracks: 1

Construction
- Structure type: Ground
- Accessible: Assisted

Other information
- Status: Unstaffed
- Station code: VYR
- Website: Transport for NSW

History
- Opened: 14 July 1935 (91 years ago)
- Rebuilt: 1991 (35 years ago)
- Electrified: Yes (from August 1991)

Passengers
- 2023: 65,070 (year); 178 (daily) (Sydney Trains, NSW TrainLink)

Services
Preceding station	Sydney Trains	Following station
Mulgrave towards Richmond	North Shore & Western Line	Riverstone towards Berowra
Mulgrave towards Richmond	Cumberland Line Late night services only	Riverstone towards Leppington
Location

Vineyard railway station is a suburban railway station located on the Richmond line, serving the Sydney suburb of Vineyard. It is served by Sydney Trains' T1 Western Line and T5 Cumberland Line services.

== History ==
Vineyard station was opened as an infill station on 14 July 1935. As part of the electrification of the line from Riverstone to Richmond in 1991, the station was completely rebuilt.

The original pre-electrification platform and corrugated shelter of Vineyard station are briefly featured in the Australian video clip of the 1985 Icehouse song "No Promises", with vocalist Iva Davies seen standing on the railcar set 606/706 passing through the station and rounding the bend.

== Services ==
=== Platforms ===
Historically, Vineyard has been served by services operating from Sydney CBD/North Shore, branching off the Western Line at Blacktown. However, after a major timetable change for the Sydney Trains network on 26 November 2017, Cumberland line services started continuing out to Richmond, rather than terminating at Schofields, during the late night, taking over from the Richmond line at these times.

Platform	Line	Stopping pattern	Notes
1	T1	services to Lindfield or North Sydney via Central services to Richmond	
1	T5	services to Leppington services to Richmond	

=== Transport links ===
Vineyard station is served by one NightRide route:

Riverstone Pde:

- N71: Richmond station to Town Hall station
