= Phillip railway station =

Former railway station in Sydney, Australia

Phillip

General information
- Location: Richmond; Sydney, New South Wales; Australia
- Coordinates: 33.5865°S 150.7256°E
- Line: Kurrajong
- Distance: 63.710 km (39.588 mi) from Central
- Platforms: 1 (1 side)
- Tracks: 1

Construction
- Structure type: Ground

Other information
- Status: Demolished

History
- Opened: 1928 (98 years ago)
- Closed: 26 July 1952 (74 years ago)
- Former names: Nepean Bridge (1928–1934)

Services
Preceding station	Former services	Following station
North Richmond towards Kurrajong	Richmond–Kurrajong Line	Richmond Terminus
Location

Phillip railway station was a suburban railway station located on the Kurrajong line, serving the Sydney suburb of Richmond. The small station served passengers between 1928 and 1952.

== History ==
Phillip station opened in 1928 as Nepean Bridge. However, by February 1934 it was proposed by the Australian Railway Historical Society to rename the station Phillip, in honour of Arthur Phillip, the first Governor of the Colony of New South Wales. The station was officially renamed on 10 June 1934.

Though the station platform was only one carriage long, during Summer months "up to 50 people" would alight at the station per train, due to the popularity of the local area. During this time, it was common practice for the guard to stop the train twice in each direction at Phillip, to allow all passengers to board or alight. In 1947, a request by Richmond Council for the platform to be extended was denied by the Department of Railways who believed that the present platform design was appropriate.

Phillip closed on 26 July 1952 due to a flood, which resulted in the closure of the entire Kurrajong line between Richmond and Kurrajong.
