= Richmond railway line =

Railway line in Sydney, New South Wales, Australia

Richmond Line
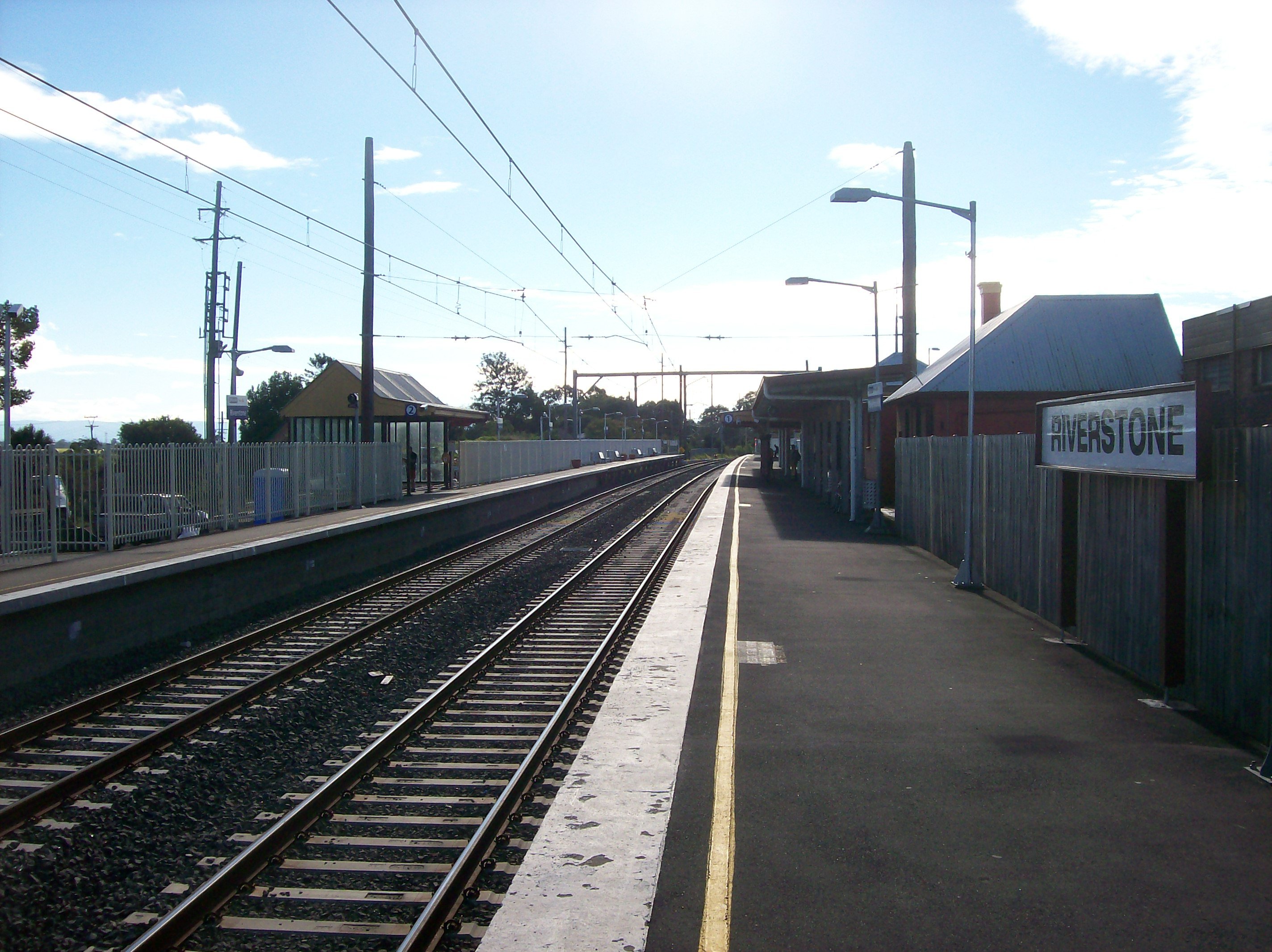
- View of the duplicated Richmond line as it runs through Riverstone.

Overview
- Owner: Transport Asset Manager of New South Wales
- Termini: Blacktown; Richmond
- Stations: 11

Service
- Services: T1 North Shore & Western Line; T5 Cumberland Line
- Operator: Sydney Trains
- Depot(s): Auburn, Hornsby
- Rolling stock: M, T, A & B sets

History
- Opened: 1 December 1864

Technical
- Track gauge: 1,435 mm (4 ft 8 1/2 in) standard gauge

The Richmond railway line is a railway line in the western suburbs of Sydney, New South Wales, Australia. It is a branch of the Main Western line. Sydney Trains operates electric passenger train services over the line and markets these as part of the North Shore & Western Line and Cumberland Line.

== Description of route ==
The railway commences between Seven Hills and Blacktown station on the western line in Sydney's western suburbs. This section of the western line consists of four tracks—two "up" tracks (meaning the direction towards Sydney) and two "down" tracks (meaning the direction away from Sydney). A flyover branches off the two "down western" line tracks and passes over the top of the two "up western" tracks to form the "down Richmond line". The "up Richmond track" connects to the two "up Western tracks" at the same point. The line then parallels the Main Western line to Blacktown station.

The line branches off in a northerly direction from the Main Western Line at Blacktown station, and Blacktown platforms 1 and 2 (an island platform) serve the Richmond Line tracks. The line then heads north as a double track electrified line, passing the Blacktown Control Box and Blacktown train sidings to Marayong station, which has an island platform. The line continues north to Quakers Hill (island platform). Two sets of points at Quakers Hill allows trains to terminate on either platform. The line continues north-west through Schofields (island platform) where the double track currently ends. Two sets of points at Schofields allows trains to terminate on either platform.

Continuing to the north-west, the line next reaches Riverstone where a passing loop and two side platforms are provided. Riverstone was the extent of electrification until the early 1990s when electrification was extended to Richmond. The line continues north as a single track through Vineyard station, Mulgrave station (where another passing loop and island platform are provided), Windsor station (single side platform) to Clarendon station. At Clarendon, another passing loop and 2 side platforms are located. From Clarendon the line heads north as a single track on its final leg through East Richmond (single side platform) to its terminus at Richmond station. At Richmond, 2 platforms (as a single island) are provided. There is an adjacent storage siding.

== History ==
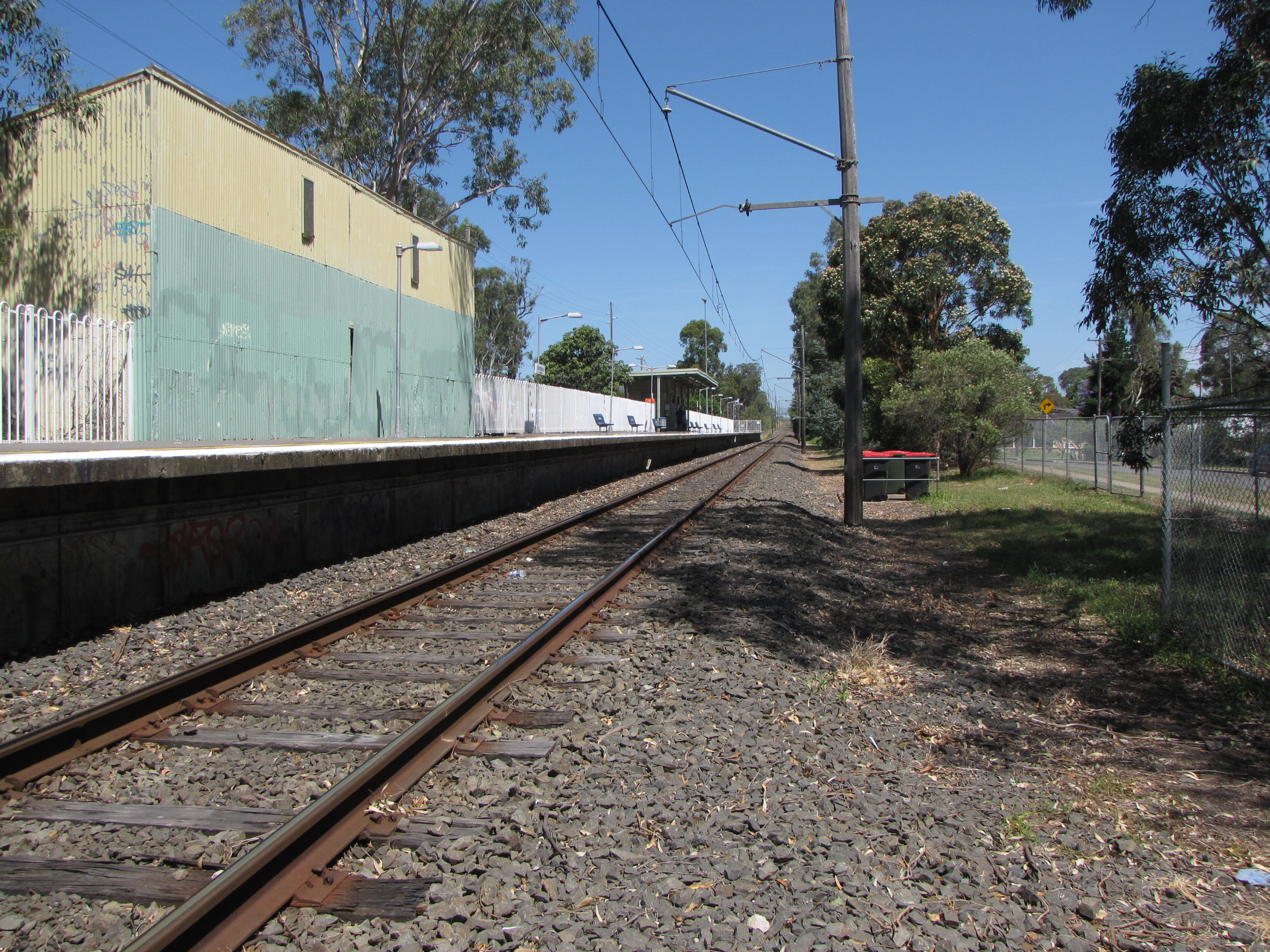
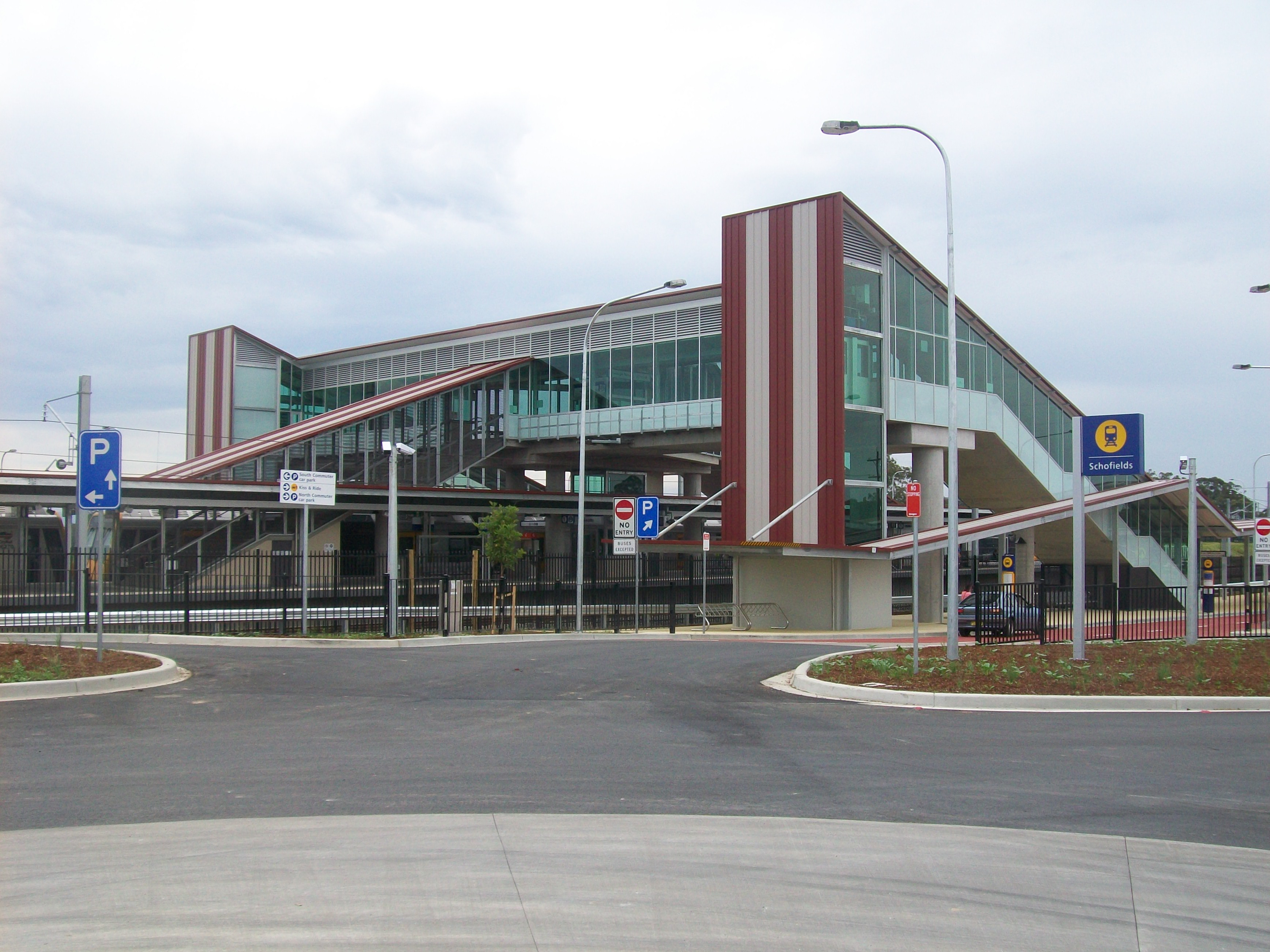
Schofields station was rebuilt in 2011. As Sydney expands, the Richmond line is being redeveloped to cope with the population influx in the area.

The line opened to Richmond in 1864 under the stewardship of engineer James Moore. In 1926, an extension was opened to Kurrajong, closing in 1952. The line was electrified from Blacktown to Riverstone in June 1975. Electrification from Riverstone to Richmond commenced in 1987 but was suspended in 1988 due to lack of funds, restarting in 1990 and opening in August 1991. Initially electric trains operated as two-car shuttles between Riverstone and Richmond until the electric power supply was upgraded to allow through running to and from Sydney in 1992.

In 2002, the track between Marayong and Quakers Hill was duplicated. Two further duplications were announced as part of the Rail Clearways Program—from Quakers Hill to Schofields and from Schofields to Vineyard. These provide extra capacity to support increased patronage, as the line passes through the middle of Sydney's "North-West Growth Centre". Duplication of the Quakers Hill to Schofields section commenced in 2009 and was completed in October 2011. The extension of the duplication to Vineyard has been deferred.

== Richmond Line stations ==
- 33°44′46″S 150°54′01″E Marayong
- 33°43′41″S 150°53′12″E Quakers Hill
- 33°42′17″S 150°52′26″E Schofields
- 33°40′45″S 150°51′37″E Riverstone
- 33°39′04″S 150°51′04″E Vineyard
- 33°37′36″S 150°49′49″E Mulgrave
- 33°36′50″S 150°48′39″E Windsor
- 33°36′32″S 150°47′17″E Clarendon
- 33°36′07″S 150°45′35″E East Richmond
- 33°35′57″S 150°45′11″E Richmond
