= T5 Cumberland Line =

Rail service in Sydney, New South Wales, Australia

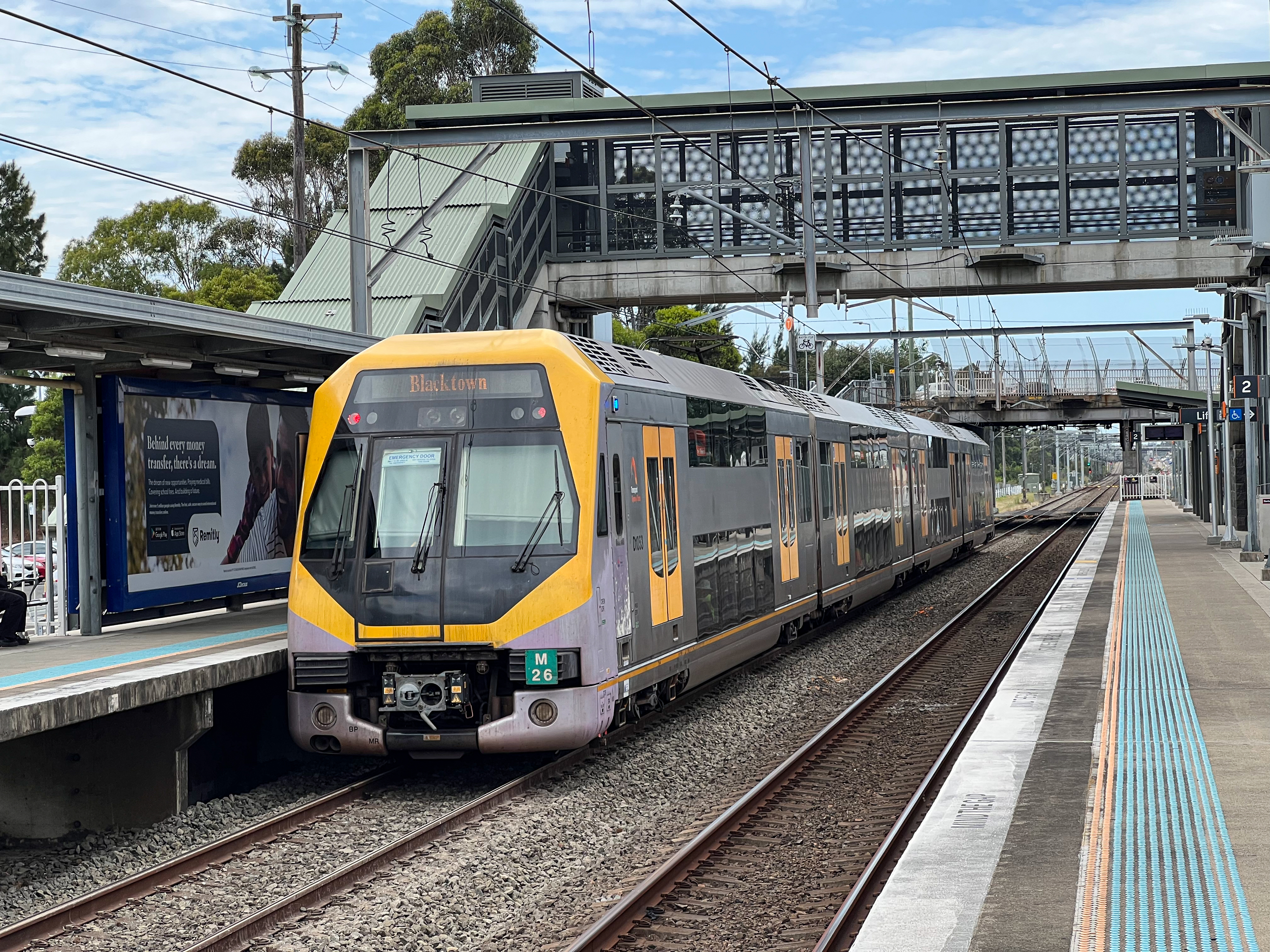
- An M set at Warwick Farm station

Overview
- Owner: Transport Asset Manager of New South Wales
- Locale: Sydney, New South Wales
- Termini: Richmond; Leppington
- Stations: 30

Service
- Type: Commuter rail
- Operator: Sydney Trains
- Rolling stock: A, B and M sets

History
- Opened: 2 November 1996; 30 years ago

Technical
- Track gauge: 1,435 mm (4 ft 8 1/2 in) standard gauge
Sydney rail network
Sydney Trains suburban services
T1 North Shore & Western
T2 Leppington & Inner West
T3 Liverpool & Inner West
T4 Eastern Suburbs & Illawarra
T5 Cumberland
T6 Lidcombe & Bankstown
T7 Olympic Park
T8 Airport & South
T9 Northern
Sydney Metro
M1 Metro North West & Bankstown

The T5 Cumberland Line is a suburban rail service operated by Sydney Trains in Sydney, New South Wales, Australia. It connects Schofields and Leppington stations in the western suburbs. Limited services extend from Schofields to Richmond. The line opened on 2 November 1996, following the construction of a 'Y-link' track between Harris Park and Merrylands stations. The intention of this link was to allow direct services to operate from the south west suburbs to Parramatta and Blacktown without requiring a change of trains at Granville. The line takes its name from the Cumberland Plain on which much of Greater Western Sydney was built.

Since 2013, the line has been numbered T5 and is coloured magenta on maps and wayfinding information.

Since 2025, the NSW Government has provided preliminarily designs for an expansion of the line dubbed the New Cumberland Line including an underground corridor preservation in Parramatta and an extension of the line to Epping similar to the former Parramatta Rail Link project that was shelved in 2003. The Albanese Government provided investment for a preliminary business case.

== History ==
The construction of a 1.6 km (0.99 mi) Y-Link between Harris Park and Merrylands was first proposed in 1993 as part of the Australian Government's Better Cities Program. It was intended to allow direct services between Campbelltown and Parramatta, which was becoming Sydney's second CBD. Construction started on 16 March 1995 and the new link was officially opened on Saturday 2 November 1996. Timetabled services began the next day, running between Blacktown and Liverpool or Campbelltown, approximately every 30 minutes. There was a total of 35 trains each weekday running between 6am and 9pm, with a reduced hours (7am–7pm) on weekends.

Service was suspended on the line during the 2000 Olympics to provide extra trains to Olympic Park, with passengers required to change at Granville as before the link opened.

In 2004 all services were cancelled for several days in February, May and July due to ongoing driver shortages. With the shortage getting worse, a timetable change came into effect on 24 July 2004, which along with changes on other lines, reduced the Cumberland Line to 5 services a day on weekdays only (3 in the morning peak, 2 in the afternoon).

In 2006, the then-Iemma Labor Government's NSW State Plan committed to re-introduce a regular half-hourly service to the Cumberland line during 2007 "subject to detailed timetable and train planning... and fleet delivery, availability and rostering". A CityRail news release on 15 December confirmed this intention, based on the gradual introduction of the then-new OScar (H set) trains, which would displace outer suburban Tangara G sets; the later trains then got reassigned to suburban service. However, this promise was not delivered, and by 2009 it was still on 5 services a day.

Daytime half-hourly services were re-introduced on 21 October 2013. Services finished in the early evening and did not operate on weekends. At this time, the line was also officially extended to Schofields, where most northbound services terminated.

As part of a major timetable change for the Sydney Trains network on 26 November 2017, Cumberland Line services were modified to no longer travel to and from Campbelltown, instead starting and terminating at Leppington. Simultaneous changes to the Airport, Inner West & South Line saw that line split into the Inner West & Leppington Line and Airport & South Line. These changes mean the section of the network between Glenfield and Macarthur is served exclusively by services operating via the East Hills railway line. The changes also saw late night and weekend services introduced on the Cumberland Line. The late night services extend to Richmond, replacing T1 services at these times. On weekends, trains operated between Schofields and Liverpool only with early morning and late night services extending to Leppington and Richmond.

== Operations ==
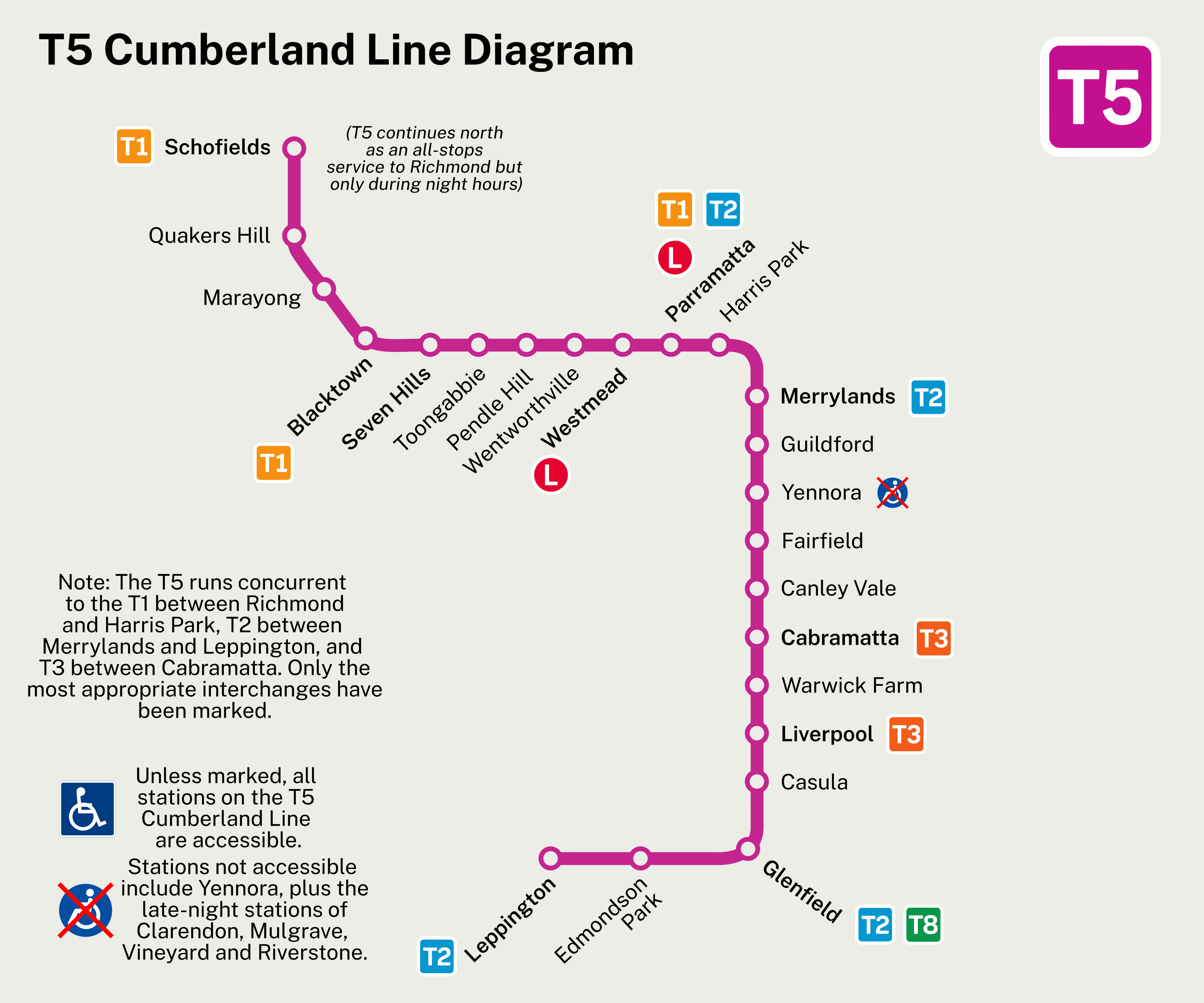
Diagram of the T5 Cumberland Line

=== Route ===
Physically, the line consists of the Richmond railway line from Schofields/Richmond to Blacktown, the Main Western Line from Blacktown station to Harris Park, the 'Y-link' as described below, the "Old Main South" between Merrylands and Cabramatta, the Main South Line between Cabramatta and Glenfield, and the South West Rail Link between Edmondson Park and Leppington.

==== Y-link ====
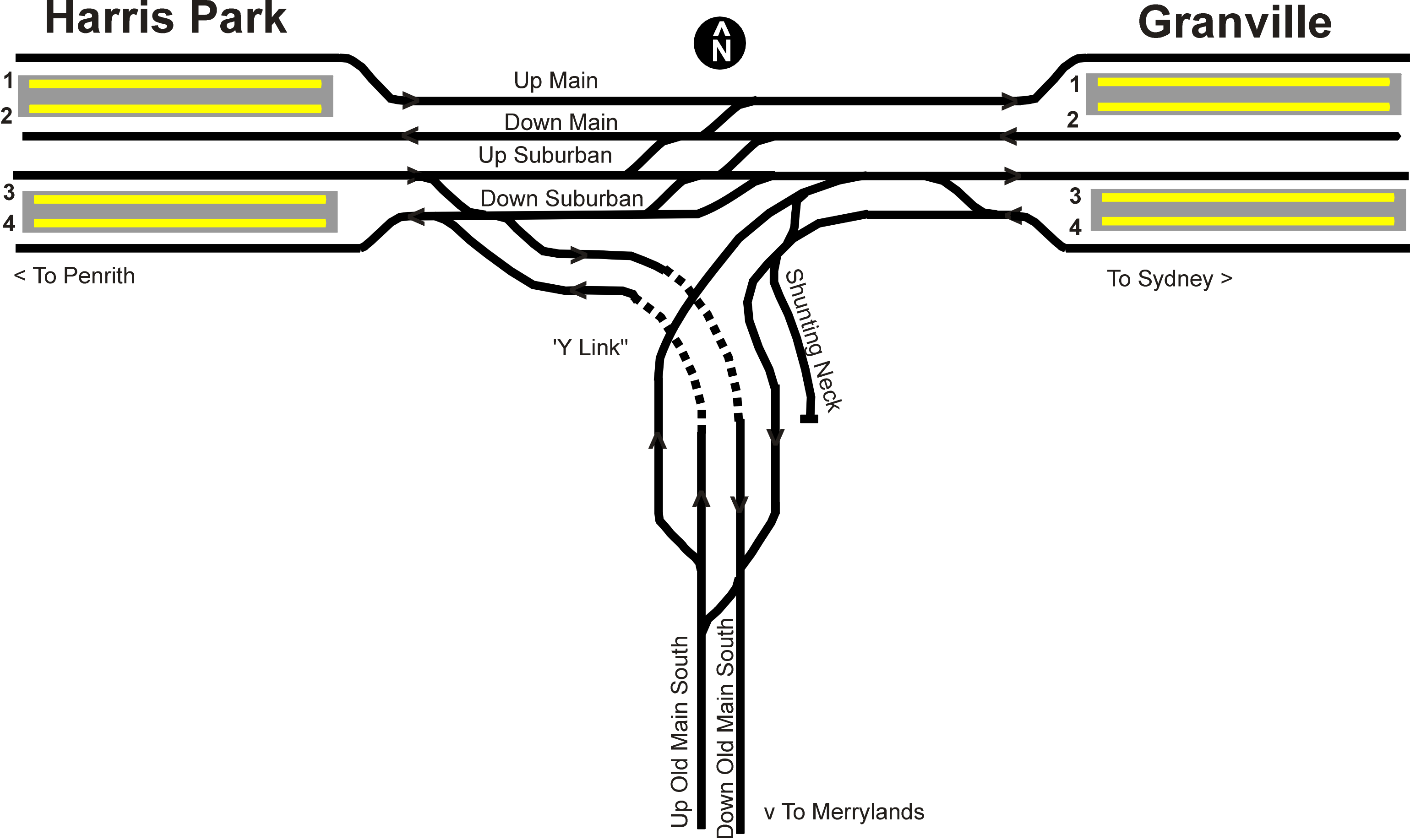
Track arrangement at the Y Link

The Y-link consists of a triangular junction at the junction of the 'Old Main South' and the 'Main Western Line. The junction is partially grade separated with a flyover for the 'Up Old Main South' to cross the Y-Link tracks.

=== Service Frequency ===
The Cumberland Line runs at an average frequency of 2 trains per hour 7 days a week, however the termini vary as follows:

Day	Time	Northern Terminus	Southern Terminus
Weekday	Peak	Blacktown	Leppington
Weekday	Offpeak	Schofields	Leppington
Weekend	Offpeak	Schofields	Liverpool
Everyday	Late Night	Richmond	Leppington

=== Fleet ===
The line has a captive fleet of both 4 and 8 car Millenniums, supplemented by 8 car Waratah sets from the T1 and T2 lines during off-peak hours.

=== Map ===
T5 interactive map

=== Stations ===
Name	Railway line	Serving suburb (s)	Other lines
Richmond – Leppington
Richmond	Richmond	Richmond, North Richmond	T1 North Shore & Western Line
East Richmond	Richmond	Richmond	T1 North Shore & Western Line
Clarendon	Richmond	Clarendon	T1 North Shore & Western Line
Windsor	Richmond	Windsor	T1 North Shore & Western Line
Mulgrave	Richmond	Mulgrave	T1 North Shore & Western Line
Vineyard	Richmond	Vineyard	T1 North Shore & Western Line
Riverstone	Richmond	Riverstone	T1 North Shore & Western Line
Schofields	Richmond	Schofields	T1 North Shore & Western Line
Quakers Hill	Richmond	Quakers Hill	T1 North Shore & Western Line
Marayong	Richmond	Marayong	T1 North Shore & Western Line
Blacktown	Richmond	Blacktown	T1 North Shore & Western Line
Seven Hills	Main Western	Seven Hills	T1 North Shore & Western Line
Toongabbie	Main Western	Toongabbie	T1 North Shore & Western Line
Pendle Hill	Main Western	Pendle Hill	T1 North Shore & Western Line
Wentworthville	Main Western	Wentworthville	T1 North Shore & Western Line
Westmead	Main Western	Westmead	T1 North Shore & Western Line
Parramatta	Main Western	Parramatta	T1 North Shore & Western Line T2 Leppington & Inner West Line
Harris Park	Main Western	Harris Park	T1 North Shore & Western Line T2 Leppington & Inner West Line
Merrylands	Old Main South	Merrylands	T2 Leppington & Inner West Line
Guildford	Old Main South	Guildford	T2 Leppington & Inner West Line
Yennora	Old Main South	Yennora	T2 Leppington & Inner West Line
Fairfield	Old Main South	Fairfield	T2 Leppington & Inner West Line
Canley Vale	Old Main South	Canley Vale	T2 Leppington & Inner West Line
Cabramatta	Main South	Cabramatta	T2 Leppington & Inner West Line T3 Liverpool & Inner West Line
Warwick Farm	Main South	Warwick Farm	T2 Leppington & Inner West Line T3 Liverpool & Inner West Line
Liverpool	Main South	Liverpool	T2 Leppington & Inner West Line T3 Liverpool & Inner West Line
Casula	Main South	Casula	T2 Leppington & Inner West Line
Glenfield	Main South	Glenfield	T2 Leppington & Inner West Line T8 Airport & South Line
Edmondson Park	South West	Edmondson Park	T2 Leppington & Inner West Line
Leppington	South West	Leppington	T2 Leppington & Inner West Line

=== Patronage ===
The following table shows the patronage of Sydney Trains network for the year ending 30 June 2024.

2025–26 Sydney Trains patronage by line (Note: Figures based on Opal tap on and tap off data)
T1 North Shore & Western Line	79,173,811	
T2 Leppington & Inner West Line	56,339,459	
T3 Liverpool & Inner West Line	11,756,216	(Note: T3 patronage split between former route via Bankstown and current route via Strathfield. The Bankstown route closed 30 September 2024.)
T4 Eastern Suburbs & Illawarra Line	63,990,365	
T5 Cumberland Line	7,629,714	
T6 Lidcombe & Bankstown Line	3,307,374	
Olympic Park railway line	2,400,479	
T8 Airport & South Line	54,235,162	
T9 Northern Line	39,379,659	
