= Clarendon railway station =

Railway station in Sydney, New South Wales, Australia

Clarendon
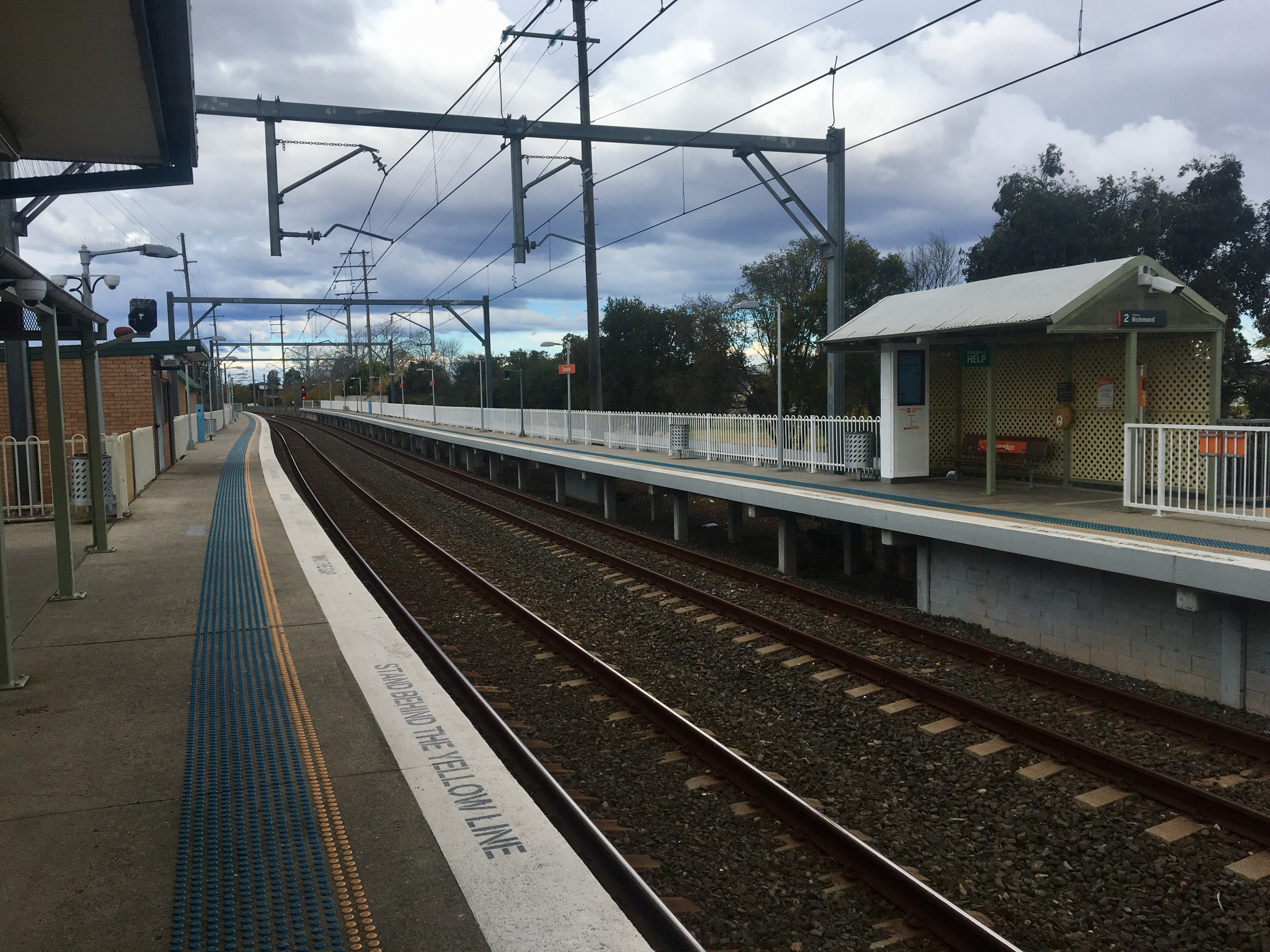
- Eastbound view from Platform 1 in August 2019

General information
- Location: Racecourse Road, Clarendon; Sydney, New South Wales; Australia
- Coordinates: 33°36′32″S 150°47′17″E
- Elevation: 15 metres (49 ft)
- Owner: Transport Asset Manager of New South Wales
- Operator: Sydney Trains
- Line: Richmond
- Distance: 57.21 km (35.55 mi) from Central
- Platforms: 2 (2 side)
- Tracks: 2
- Connections: Bus

Construction
- Structure type: Ground
- Accessible: Assisted

Other information
- Status: Weekdays: Staffed: 6am to 2pm
- Station code: CRD
- Website: Transport for NSW

History
- Opened: 1870 (156 years ago)
- Electrified: Yes (from August 1991)
- Former names: Hawkesbury Racecourse (1870–1876)

Passengers
- 2025: 50,001 (year); 137 (daily) (Sydney Trains)
- Rank: 238

Services
Preceding station	Sydney Trains	Following station
East Richmond towards Richmond	North Shore & Western Line	Windsor towards Berowra
East Richmond towards Richmond	Cumberland Line Late night services only	Windsor towards Leppington
Location

Clarendon railway station is a suburban railway station located on the Richmond line, serving the Sydney suburb of Clarendon. It is served by Sydney Trains T1 Western Line and T5 Cumberland Line services.

== History ==
Clarendon station opened in 1870 as Hawkesbury Racecourse, being renamed Clarendon on 1 November 1876.

In 2024, it was the least visited station across the entire Sydney suburban network.

=== Air show service ===
An annual air show takes place on the adjacent RAAF Base Richmond and special train services operate. The line west of Clarendon to Richmond is downgraded to a siding, and as trains arrive at Clarendon, terminate and stable on the temporary siding beyond. A connecting bus maintains a passenger service to East Richmond and Richmond stations.

== Services ==
=== Platforms ===
Services to Clarendon operate from either the North Shore or South-West Sydney, branching off the Main Western railway line at Blacktown. Since 26 November 2017, the T1 Western Line serves Clarendon throughout the entirety of the day, except when late night T5 Cumberland Line services continue to Richmond, rather than terminating at Schofields.

Platform	Line	Stopping pattern	Notes
1	T1	services to Lindfield or North Sydney via Central	
1	T5	services to Leppington	
2	T1	services to Richmond	
2	T5	services to Richmond	

=== Transport links ===
Clarendon station is served by one NightRide route:

Racecourse Rd:

- N71: Richmond station to Town Hall station
