= Mulgrave railway station =

Railway station in Sydney, New South Wales, Australia

Mulgrave
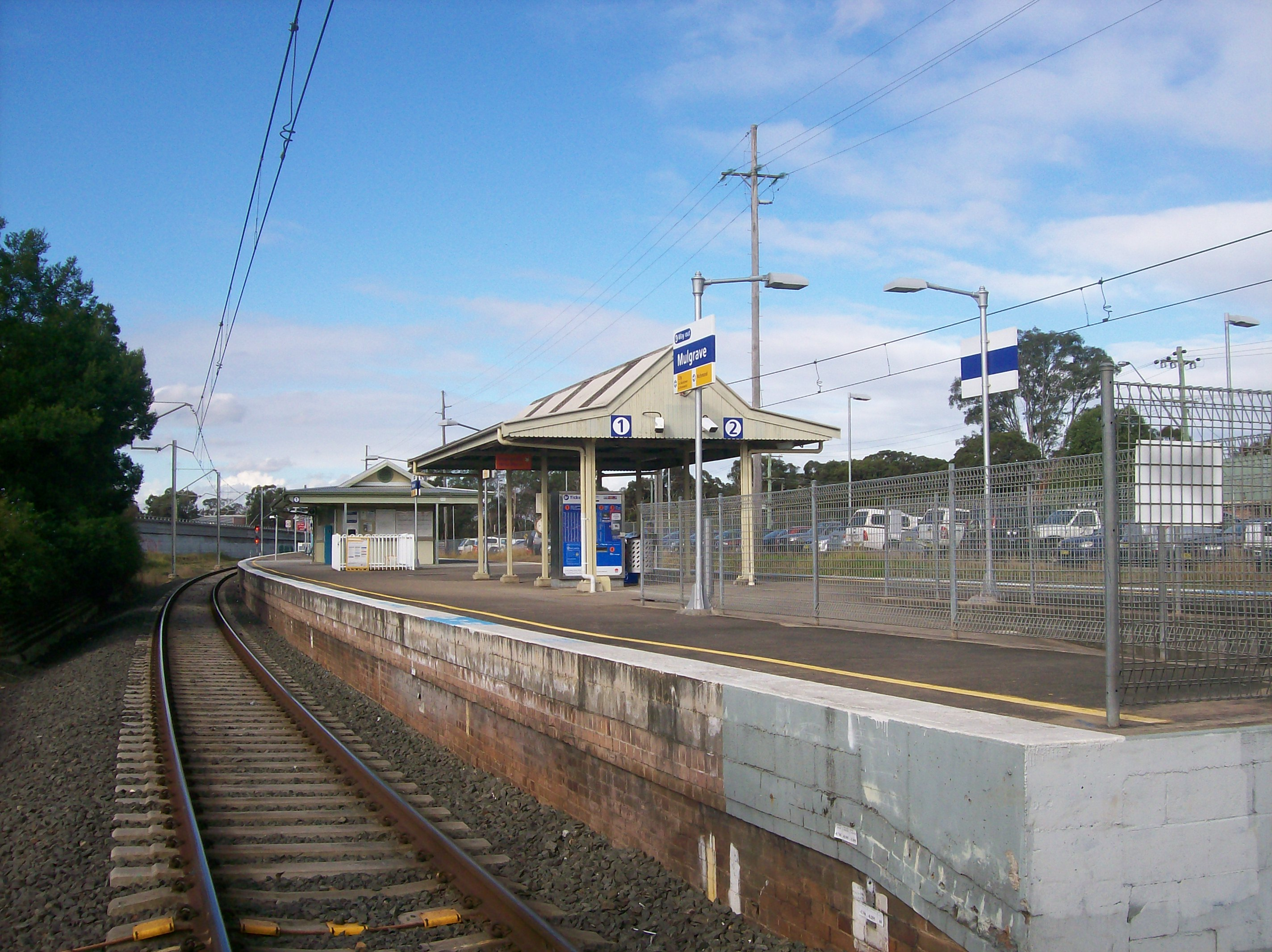
- Eastbound view looking at platform and building in the distance, July 2012

General information
- Location: Mulgrave Road, Mulgrave; Sydney, New South Wales; Australia
- Coordinates: 33°37′36″S 150°49′49″E
- Elevation: 14 metres (46 ft)
- Owner: Transport Asset Manager of New South Wales
- Operator: Sydney Trains
- Line: Richmond
- Distance: 52.59 km (32.68 mi) from Central
- Platforms: 2 (1 island)
- Tracks: 2

Construction
- Structure type: Ground
- Accessible: Assisted

Other information
- Station code: MUV
- Website: Transport for NSW

History
- Opened: 1 December 1864 (161 years ago)
- Rebuilt: 1912 (114 years ago)
- Electrified: Yes (from August 1991)

Passengers
- 2025: 125,074 (year); 343 (daily) (Sydney Trains)
- Rank: 205

Services
Preceding station	Sydney Trains	Following station
Windsor towards Richmond	North Shore & Western Line	Vineyard towards Berowra
Windsor towards Richmond	Cumberland Line Late night services only	Vineyard towards Leppington
Location

Mulgrave railway station is a suburban railway station located on the Richmond line, serving the Sydney suburb of Mulgrave. It is served by Sydney Trains' T1 Western Line and T5 Cumberland Line services.

== History ==
The original Mulgrave station opened on 1 December 1864 coinciding with that of the Richmond line. It was relocated east to its present site in 1912. In 1939, it was converted to an island platform with a passing loop added.

The station and NSW steam locomotive 3024 featured in a 1967 music video by The Seekers, for the song Angeline is Always Friday, shortly before the line was electrified.

== Services ==
=== Platforms ===
Historically, Mulgrave has been served by services operating from Sydney CBD/North Shore, branching off the Western Line at Blacktown. However, after a major timetable change for the Sydney Trains network on 26 November 2017, Cumberland line services started continuing out to Richmond, rather than terminating at Schofields, during the late night, taking over from the Richmond line at these times.

Platform	Line	Stopping pattern	Notes
1	North Shore & Western Line	services to Lindfield or North Sydney via Central	
1	Cumberland Line	services to Leppington	
2	North Shore & Western Line	services to Richmond	
2	Cumberland Line	services to Richmond	

=== Transport links ===
Mulgrave station is served by one NightRide route:

Railway Rd S:

- N71: Richmond station to Town Hall station
