= Schofields railway station =

Railway station in Sydney, New South Wales, Australia

Schofields
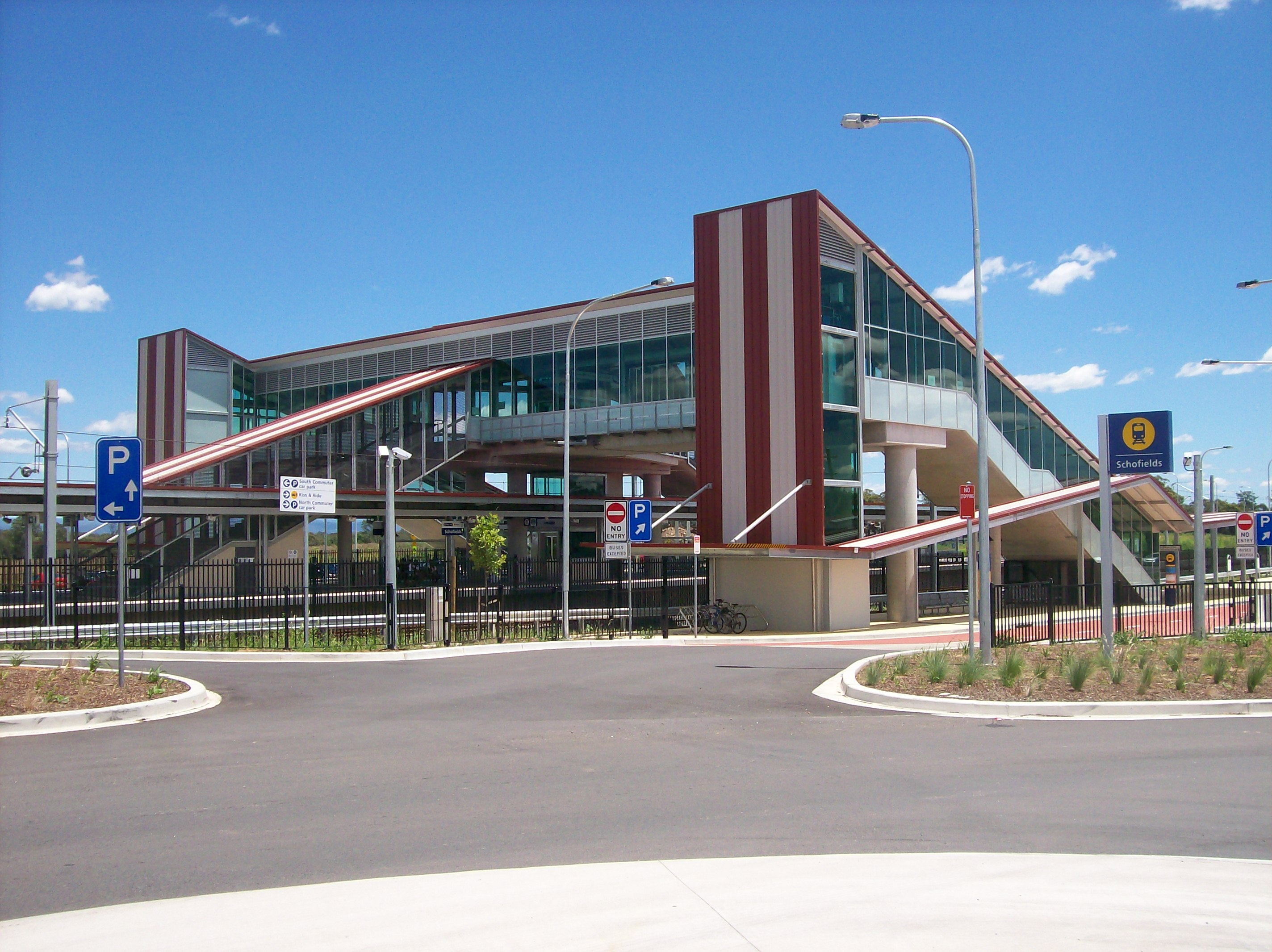
- Station building and entrance, November 2011

General information
- Location: Railway Terrace, Schofields; Sydney, New South Wales; Australia
- Coordinates: 33°42′17″S 150°52′26″E
- Elevation: 33 metres (108 ft)
- Owner: Transport Asset Manager of New South Wales
- Operator: Sydney Trains
- Line: Richmond
- Distance: 43.75 km (27.18 mi) from Central
- Platforms: 2 (1 island)
- Tracks: 2
- Connections: Bus

Construction
- Structure type: Ground
- Parking: 230 spaces
- Cycle facilities: 40 racks
- Accessible: Yes

Other information
- Status: Weekdays: Staffed: 6am to 2pm: Weekends and public holidays: Unstaffed
- Station code: SFS
- Website: Transport for NSW

History
- Opened: 1870 (156 years ago)
- Rebuilt: 29 October 2011 (14 years ago)
- Electrified: Yes; since June 1975

Passengers
- 2025: 2,126,276 (year); 5,825 (daily) (Sydney Trains)
- Rank: 73

Services
Preceding station	Sydney Trains	Following station
Riverstone towards Richmond	North Shore & Western Line	Quakers Hill towards Berowra
Terminus	North Shore & Western Line	Quakers Hill towards Berowra
Riverstone Late night services only towards Richmond	Cumberland Line	Quakers Hill towards Leppington
Terminus	Cumberland Line	Quakers Hill towards Leppington
Location

Schofields railway station is a suburban railway station located on the Richmond line, serving the Sydney suburb of Schofields. It is served by Sydney Trains' T1 Western Line and T5 Cumberland Line services.

== History ==
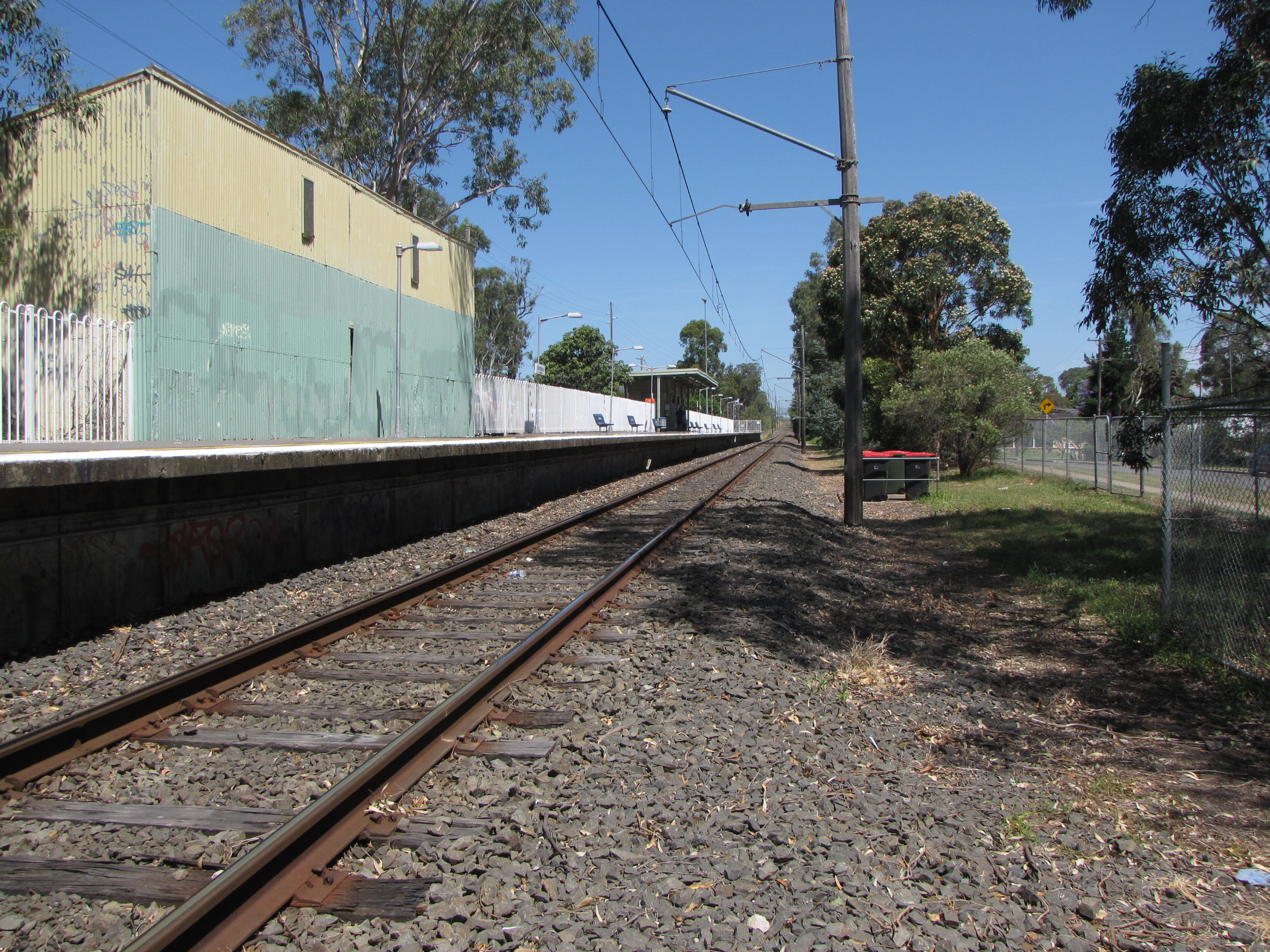
Eastbound view of the former station in November 2009

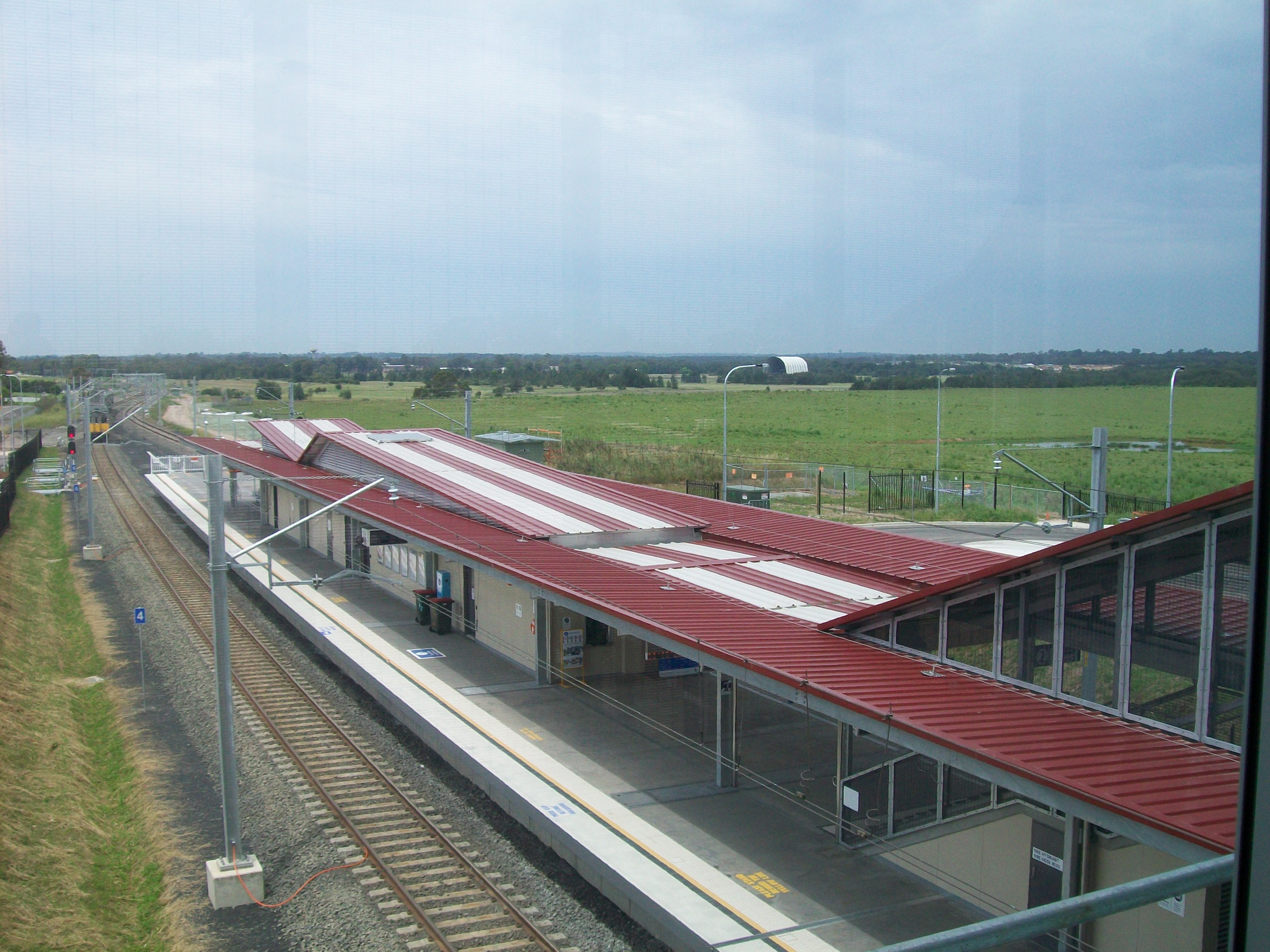
Eastbound view from the concourse in October 2011

Schofields station opened in 1870. It was named after John Schofield, a local pioneer who was a former convict who later settled in the area after building a saw mill beside the railway line. The former station was originally opened as a siding stop with a platform made from railway sleepers in the early 1870s on the western side of the track, which was later rebuilt in brick in 1888 along with a goods loop after the Richmond line was upgraded by John Whitton, the then engineer-in-chief. The history of the station and surrounding local area have been highlighted through signs placed near the entrances to both former and present station sites.

=== First station ===
The old Schofields station consisted of a single side platform with street level access on the eastern side of the track. A pedestrian level crossing to the north of the platform allowed access to the other side of the track. An interesting feature of the station was the adjacent grain and produce facility that protruded into the railway platform. The old station closed on 3 October 2011.

=== Current station ===
==== Background ====
From 2009 to 2011, the track between Quakers Hill and Schofields was duplicated for more than three kilometres as part of the Rail Clearways Program. This was intended as the first stage of a broader plan to duplicate the line as far as Vineyard. In order to be able to continue the duplication towards Richmond, it was proposed re-align a short section of track and relocate Schofields station to a site with fewer space constraints, 800 metres south of the existing station. The proposal to relocate the station was a controversial one and raised concerns amongst residents and businesses located near the former station, in relation to accessibility and urban decay. Despite opposition to the plans from Blacktown City Council and the government's own local representative, John Aquilina MP, construction commenced and the station opened on 29 October 2011. The new station is located in a developing area, foreseeing future residential development, and is designed to support a dramatic increase in patronage.

==== Description ====
The station features a distinctive colour scheme of maroon and cream as seen on the tin roofing, inspired by the station master's residence at Riverstone station and reflecting on the European heritage of the local Richmond area and consists of an island platform. The station also includes indicator screens on the platforms and network status screens indicating trackwork or service interruptions on the concourse. The station is equipped for disabled access with lifts from street level to the concourse and to the platform levels.

230 parking spaces are available at the station with 110 on the Railway Terrace side and 120 on the Bridge Street side (opened in mid December 2011), with both including disabled parking spaces. Although claimed to be three times the size of the previous station car park, issues have arisen concerning the size of the area. 40 bicycle racks are available. A "kiss-and-ride" zone is located parallel to the bus interchange. As part of the relocation, a shared pedestrian and cycling path was built between the former station to the current site and a footbridge was constructed at the site of the former station to replace the pedestrian level crossing.

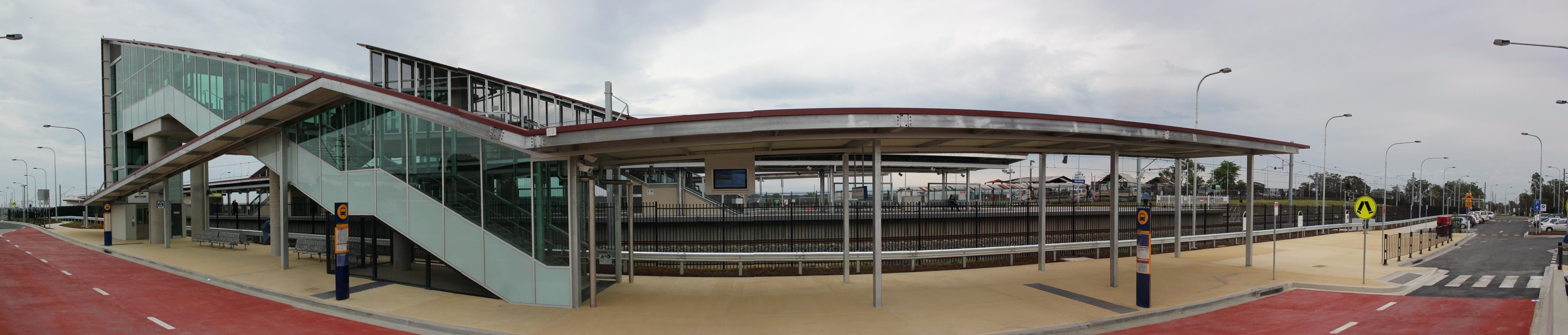
Eastern side of the station in November 2011; the bus interchange is on the left, station entrance via stairs in the centre and one of the carparks on the right

=== Future ===
A scoping study into rail investment to service Western Sydney and the proposed Western Sydney Airport was announced by the New South Wales and Australian governments in November 2015. The study's final report was released in March 2018. There is a plan to extend the Metro North West & Bankstown Line from Tallawong to Schofields, St Marys and the under-construction Sydney Metro Western Sydney Airport Line, however due to differences in electric voltage, the lines will not be interoperable.

== Services ==
=== Platforms ===
During the week, T5 Cumberland Line services terminate at Schofields. Late night services throughout the week however, extend to Richmond, replacing T1 services at these times.

Platform	Line	Stopping pattern	Notes
1	North Shore & Western Line	services to and from North Sydney or Hornsby via Central	
1	Cumberland Line	services to Liverpool and Leppington	
2	North Shore & Western Line	services to Richmond and Hornsby or North Sydney via Central	
2	Cumberland Line	services to Richmond or Leppington late at night.	

=== Transport links ===
Busways operates two bus routes via Schofields station, under contract to Transport for NSW:

Stand A:

- Drop-off only

Stand B:

- 734: Blacktown station to Riverstone via The Ponds
- 748: Tallawong station to Melonba via Marsden Park

Schofields station is served by one NightRide route:

- N71: Richmond station to Town Hall station
