= Richmond railway station, Sydney =

Railway station in Sydney, New South Wales, Australia

Richmond
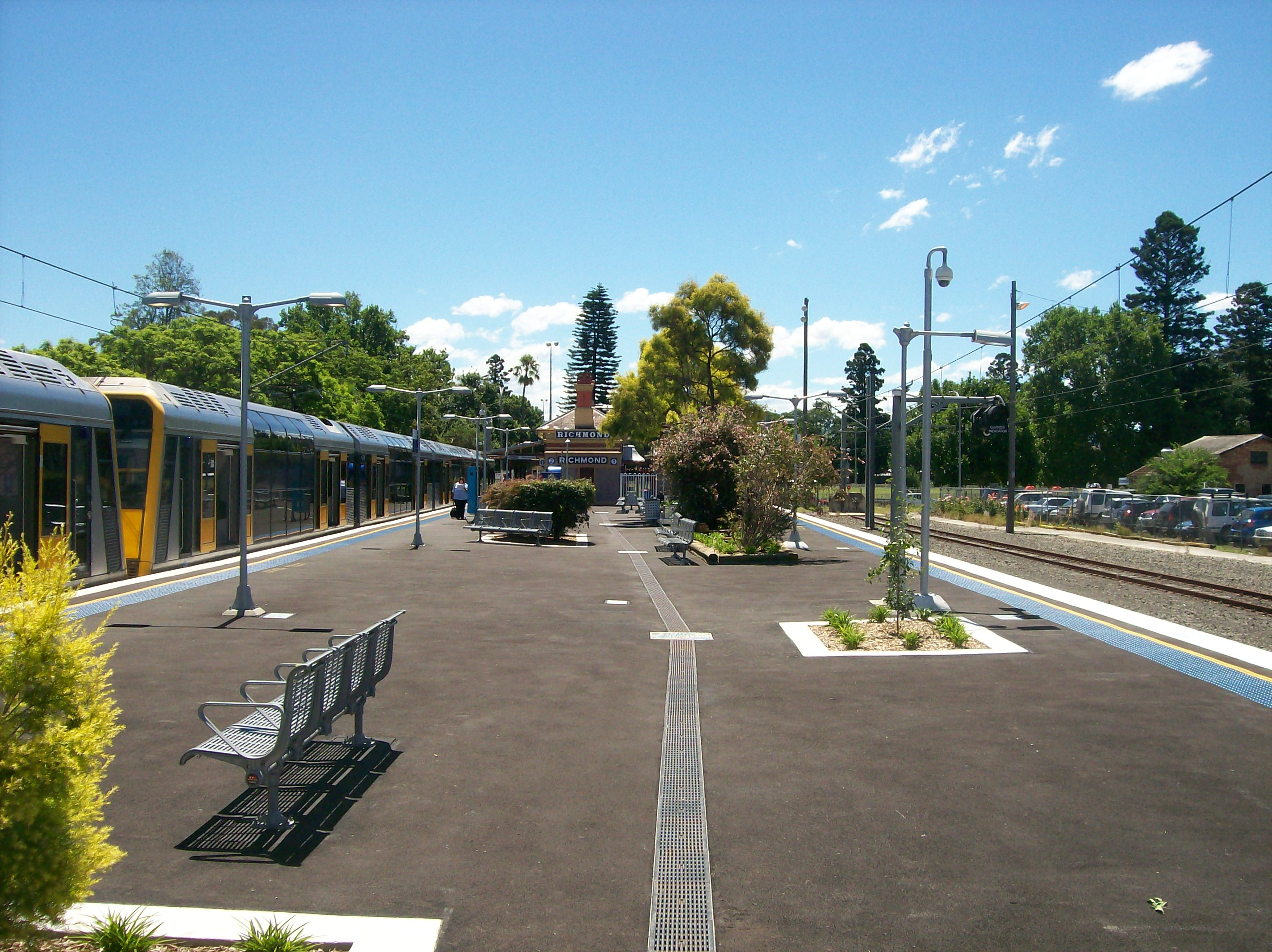
- Westbound view of station platform with station building in view in November 2012

General information
- Location: East Market Street, Richmond; Sydney, New South Wales; Australia
- Coordinates: 33°35′57″S 150°45′11″E
- Elevation: 23 metres (75 ft)
- Owner: Transport Asset Manager of New South Wales
- Operator: Sydney Trains
- Lines: Richmond; Kurrajong
- Distance: 60.68 km (37.70 mi) from Central
- Platforms: 2 (1 island)
- Tracks: 3
- Connections: Bus

Construction
- Structure type: Ground
- Accessible: Yes

Other information
- Status: Staffed
- Station code: RCD
- Website: Transport for NSW

History
- Opened: 1 December 1864 (161 years ago)
- Electrified: Yes (from August 1991)

Passengers
- 2025: 368,279 (year); 1,009 (daily) (Sydney Trains)
- Rank: 172

Services
Preceding station	Sydney Trains	Following station
Terminus	T1 North Shore & Western Line	East Richmond towards Berowra
Terminus	T5 Cumberland Line Late night services only	East Richmond towards Leppington
Former services
Preceding station	Former services	Following station
North Richmond towards Kurrajong	Richmond–Kurrajong Line (1926–1928)	Terminus
Phillip towards Kurrajong	Richmond–Kurrajong Line (1928–1952)	Terminus
Location

Richmond railway station is a heritage-listed suburban railway station and the terminus of the Richmond line, serving the Sydney suburb of Richmond. It is served by Sydney Trains T1 Western Line and T5 Cumberland Line services. It was added to the New South Wales State Heritage Register on 2 April 1999.

== History ==
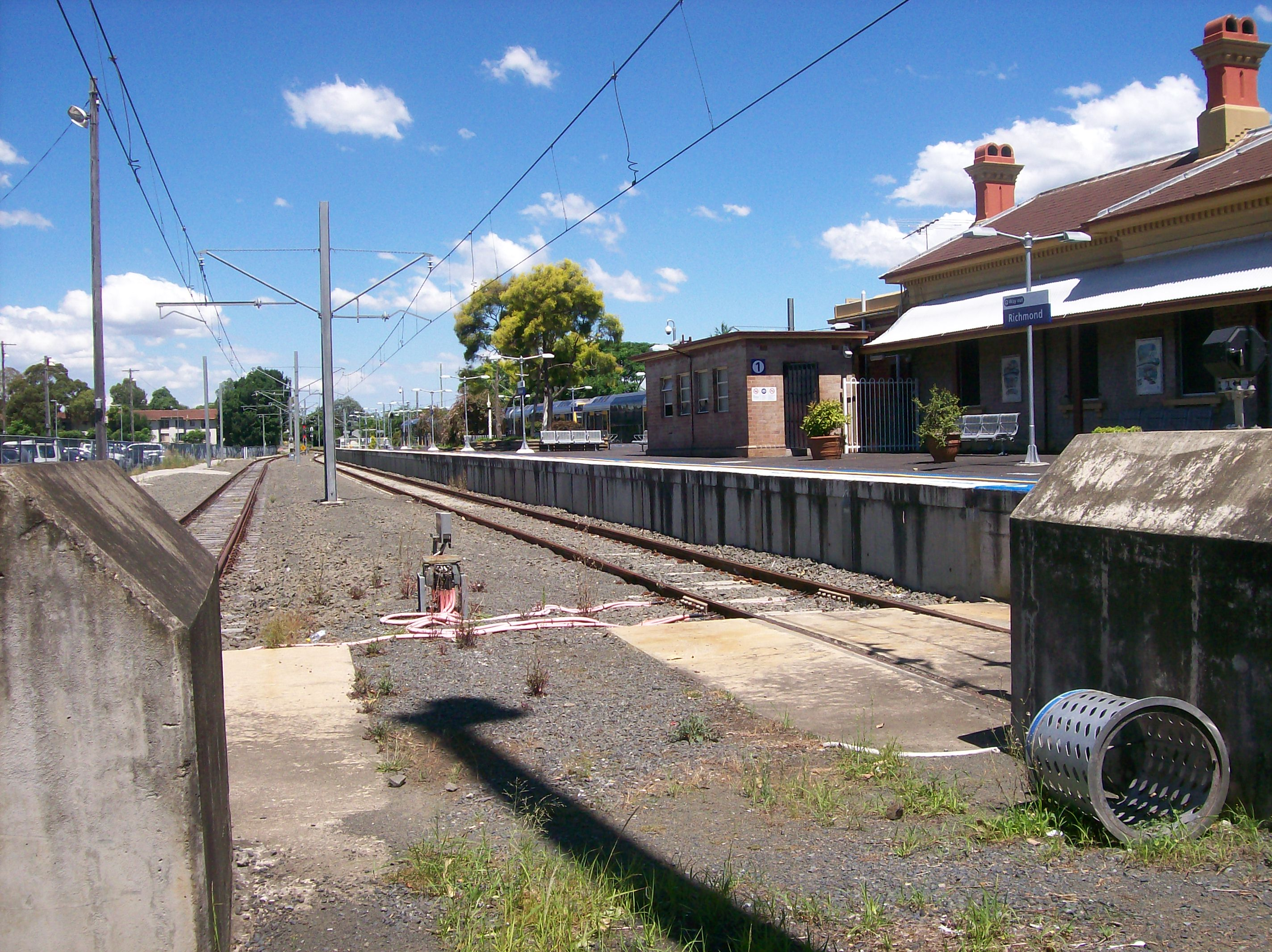
Eastbound view in January 2012

The Richmond line opened on 1 December 1864 as a rural branch line in response to the area's success as a farming district and its location at the intersection of two stock routes.

In 1856, a petition for the establishment of a railway from the residents of Windsor and Richmond had been presented to the Government. In 1860 a grant of (Pounds)57,000 was approved for a railway between Blacktown and Windsor. In the following year it was increased to (Pounds)60,000 for a railway between Blacktown and Richmond. Contracts for earthworks, permanent ways and bridges were let from 1862. The line was opened on 29 November 1864 by Governor Sir John Young. A pilot engine was run before all passenger trains for safety. The original stations were Riverstone, Mulgrave, Windsor and Richmond. Upgrade to the track took place in the late nineteenth century.

A major upgrading of most stations on the line occurred in the 1880s, including Richmond. The present brick platform building dates from 1881, prior to the opening of Windsor station, although the two station buildings are almost identical.

On 8 December 1926, the line was extended to Kurrajong with the line leaving from Platform 1, then going across the corner of Richmond Park and along the side of March Street. This extension closed on 26 July 1952 after a landslide near Kurrajong during heavy rain. Having low levels of traffic its restoration could not be justified. Little evidence of it now remains.

The early decades of the 20th century brought further improvements and upgrades to the line. These included the establishment of RAAF Base Richmond in 1925, which resulted in a significant increase in the use of the line. A skillion roof signal box was constructed c. 1916.

In 1938, congestion at Clarendon railway station caused by a RAAF Air Show resulted in extensive improvements. All station platforms were increased to 450 feet and additional facilities were installed at Richmond.

1940s plans show proposed additions and alterations to the station in the Inter-war functionalist style and stockyards in the precinct. The station additions were not completed. An undated plan shows a goods shed opposite the station, a turntable and a carriage shed and an engine shed. Water tanks and coal loading facilities are also shown (no longer extant), and a gate keepers cottage on the Sydney side of the level crossing near East Richmond Railway Station.

During the 1950s, a detached cleaners' building was erected at the rear of the platform building.

An engine shed was demolished in 1983. There no longer appears to be any evidence of the former yard as the area around the station has been developed for purposes such as carparking and a McDonald's.

As part of the electrification of the line from Riverstone in 1991, the yard was remodeled with the current train storage sidings laid on the northern side of the station and removal of tracks from the southern side. In 1996 all rooms to the station building were internally altered, except the General Waiting Room. Externally, the building is largely unaltered.

At around 10am on Monday 22 January 2018, 8-car Waratah train A42 arriving at Richmond Platform 2 overran the buffers, resulting in at least 16 serious injuries and the 3rd car to be jacked up. This Waratah set was then sent to Cardiff to be repaired, and has re-entered service with the front carriage replaced with a spare.

== Services ==
=== Platforms ===
Services to Richmond operate from either the North Shore or South-West Sydney, branching off the Main Western railway line at Blacktown. Since 26 November 2017, the T1 Western Line serves Richmond throughout the entirety of the day, except when late night T5 Cumberland Line services continue to Richmond, rather than terminating at Schofields.

Platform	Line	Stopping pattern	Notes
1	T1 North Shore & Western Line	Terminating services to and from Lindfield or North Sydney via Central	
1	T5 Cumberland Line	Terminating services to and from Leppington	
2	T1 North Shore & Western Line	Terminating services to and from Lindfield or North Sydney via Central (Used only on weekends).	
2	T5 Cumberland Line	Terminating services to and from Leppington	

=== Transport links ===
Busways operates seven bus routes via Richmond station, under contract to Transport for NSW:

East Market St:

- 668: to Windsor station via Freemans Reach
- 675A: to Windsor station via Bligh Park
- 675C: to Windsor station via RAAF Base Richmond
- 677: to Penrith station via Londonderry
- 678: to Penrith station via Castlereagh
- 680: to Bowen Mountain
- 682: to Kurrajong or Berambing

Richmond station is served by one NightRide route:

- N71: to Town Hall station

== Description ==
The Richmond station precinct includes a type 3, second-class station building with a brick-faced platform (1881), the remnants of a brick dock platform and the remains of the Kurrajong line (both 1926), and a cleaning store (1950).

=== Station building (1881) ===
The brick station building is a type 3 "Second Class" station building dating to 1881. It is a symmetrical building on a centre access with wings at both ends of the building. It has a slate hipped roof with a centre transverse gable. The three painted brick chimneys are a striking feature with their decorative stone and arched chimney pots. The windows are generally timber double hung with stone or concrete lintels and sills. Transom lights are located above most of the timber four panel doors, although some have been removed to accommodate services such as air-conditioning. Painted decorative dentilated mouldings are located at the top of the walls under the eaves. The exterior is punctuated with a variety of new services and signs related to the daily operations of the station.

The Platform 1 side has a corrugated iron sheeted ogee verandah roof supported on timber columns with sandstone bases that extends only partway along the building. The Platform 2 side has a skillion roofed verandah with decorative iron columns and brackets that extend along the entirety of the central section of the building. It is also sheeted in corrugated style metal sheeting. Modern seating, ticket machines, garbage bins and gardens are located at various locations. The female toilets located on the platform have what appear to be restored early marble and timber station signs hung on the exterior walls.

Internally, the building retains its historic character despite the 1990s refurbishment. Internal detailing includes some mini orb ceilings, ceiling roses, blocked up fireplaces with timber surrounds, moulded plaster cornices, timber window and door frames, architraves and skirtings. Many services are surface mounted.

The station building is in good condition apart from a few minor issues on Platform 2 near the ticket window where a waterpipe appears to have created some ongoing damp issues to the base of the building that have resulted in mortar degradation and flaking paint. It is also evident that repointing works carried out with hard cement mortar resulted in some deterioration on brick substrate.

Externally the building has a high degree of integrity and intactness. Internally, considerable reorganisation has taken place. However, the overall character of the station remains intact. The removal of the associated rail yard components of the site reduces its ability to demonstrate this element of its history.

=== Cleaning store (1950) ===
A flat roofed, detached brick building which has been constructed as a cleaners room stands between the station building and the edge of Platform 1. It was assessed as being in good condition at the time of heritage listing.

=== Platform (1881) ===
Richmond Station has a brick faced island platform with concrete deck and asphalt finish. Modern buffers are located at the end of the rail line. White aluminium palisade fencing has been erected around the station and pedestrian crossing at the end of the line as a safety barrier.

=== Dock platform (1926) ===
The dock platform remains as a brick and grassed island in the middle of the northern carpark. It was assessed as being in moderate condition at the time of heritage listing.

=== Kurrajong line and yard remains (1926) ===
The former Kurrajong line sidings, former sidings, stock yards, turntable and engine shed appear to be visible under the car park which has been topped with asphalt surface. Remnants may survive below the new surface.

=== Landscape features ===
There are a number of mature trees and plantings on the eastern side of the platform that add to the significant setting of the station.

=== Modifications and dates ===
- 1890 – Kitchen erected at gate house.
- 1897 – Engine shed extended.
- 1900 – Carriage shelter shed provided.
- 1903 – Station Master's house damaged by fire.
- 1908 – Platform extended.
- 1909 – Purchase of land to extend the yard.
- 1912 – Platform extended.
- 1914 – Rest house erected.
- 1916 – Interlocked.
- 1923 – Runround loop laid in at platform.
- 1925 – Turntable site relocated.
- 1927 – An additional water column installed.
- 1950s – A detached cleaners' building was erected at the rear of the platform building.
- 1952 – Water tank transferred to Dunheved.
- 1957 – Providing lighting at the water column, coal stage and in the engine shed.
- 1967 – 600 Class two-car diesel train introduced on branch.
- 1971 – Last steam passenger service ran.
- 1984 – Engine shed removed.
- 1987 – Gate house demolished.
- 1996 – All rooms were internally altered and some given new uses, except the general Waiting Room.

The yard and evidence of the Kurrajong line appears to have been entirely removed except for an additional line behind Platform 1. Some minor changes have been made to some doors, windows and signage of the Station. The skillion roof signal box c. 1916 appears to have been demolished.

== Heritage listing ==
Richmond Railway Station is of state significance as an early railway station dating from 1867 that was instrumental in opening up the farming district of the Hawkesbury to provide transport for fresh produce to the Sydney markets. The 1880s station building is a fine example of a Victorian second-class station building and provides evidence of the prosperity and growth of Richmond following the arrival of the railway during the nineteenth century. The station remains as the terminus for the Richmond Branch Line and is significant as a landmark in the historic town and for its continuity of use for over 140 years. The Kurrajong siding is significant as evidence of the former branch line which operated between Richmond and Kurrajong from 1926 – 1952.

Richmond railway station was listed on the New South Wales State Heritage Register on 2 April 1999 having satisfied the following criteria.

The place is important in demonstrating the course, or pattern, of cultural or natural history in New South Wales.

Richmond Station has historical significance as the termination point for the Sydney metropolitan railway system in that direction dating from 1867, with no continuation of train services by other providers. The station was instrumental in opening up the farming district of Hawkesbury to provide transport for fresh produce to Sydney markets. The existing station building is historically significant as an early station building from the 1880s and for its association with the upgrade of the Richmond line in the 1880s. Remnant dock platform and shadow siding to the rear are one of the few remaining pieces of evidence of the Kurrajong line that operated between 1926 and 1952.

The place is important in demonstrating aesthetic characteristics and/or a high degree of creative or technical achievement in New South Wales.

Richmond Railway Station is aesthetically significant as a fine example of the architecture of larger railway station buildings in the late nineteenth century demonstrating key characteristics of a Victorian second-class station building. It retains most of its original external detailing and provides evidence of the prosperity and growth of Richmond following the arrival of the railway.

The place has a strong or special association with a particular community or cultural group in New South Wales for social, cultural or spiritual reasons.

The place has the potential to contribute to the local community's sense of place, and can provide a connection to the local community's past.

The place possesses uncommon, rare or endangered aspects of the cultural or natural history of New South Wales.

The station building is rare as one of three larger, significant station buildings built on the Richmond line in the 1880s, the others being at Windsor and Riverstone.

The place is important in demonstrating the principal characteristics of a class of cultural or natural places/environments in New South Wales.

The station is one of three larger, significant station buildings built on the Richmond line in the 1880s, the others being at Windsor and Riverstone. These differ significantly from the smaller, simpler stations built elsewhere on the line. The station building is a fine example of a late nineteenth century station building, representing the peak of achievement in station architecture that is known as second-class station building.
