= Guildford railway station (disambiguation) =

Guildford railway station is a national rail station in Guildford, Surrey, England

Guildford railway station may also refer to:

- Guildford railway station, Sydney, Australia
- Guildford railway station, Perth, Western Australia
- Guildford railway station, Victoria, on the Moolort railway line, Australia

== See also ==
- London Road (Guildford) railway station, the other station in the town of Guildford, Surrey
