= Guildford railway station, Sydney =

Railway station in Sydney, New South Wales, Australia

Guildford
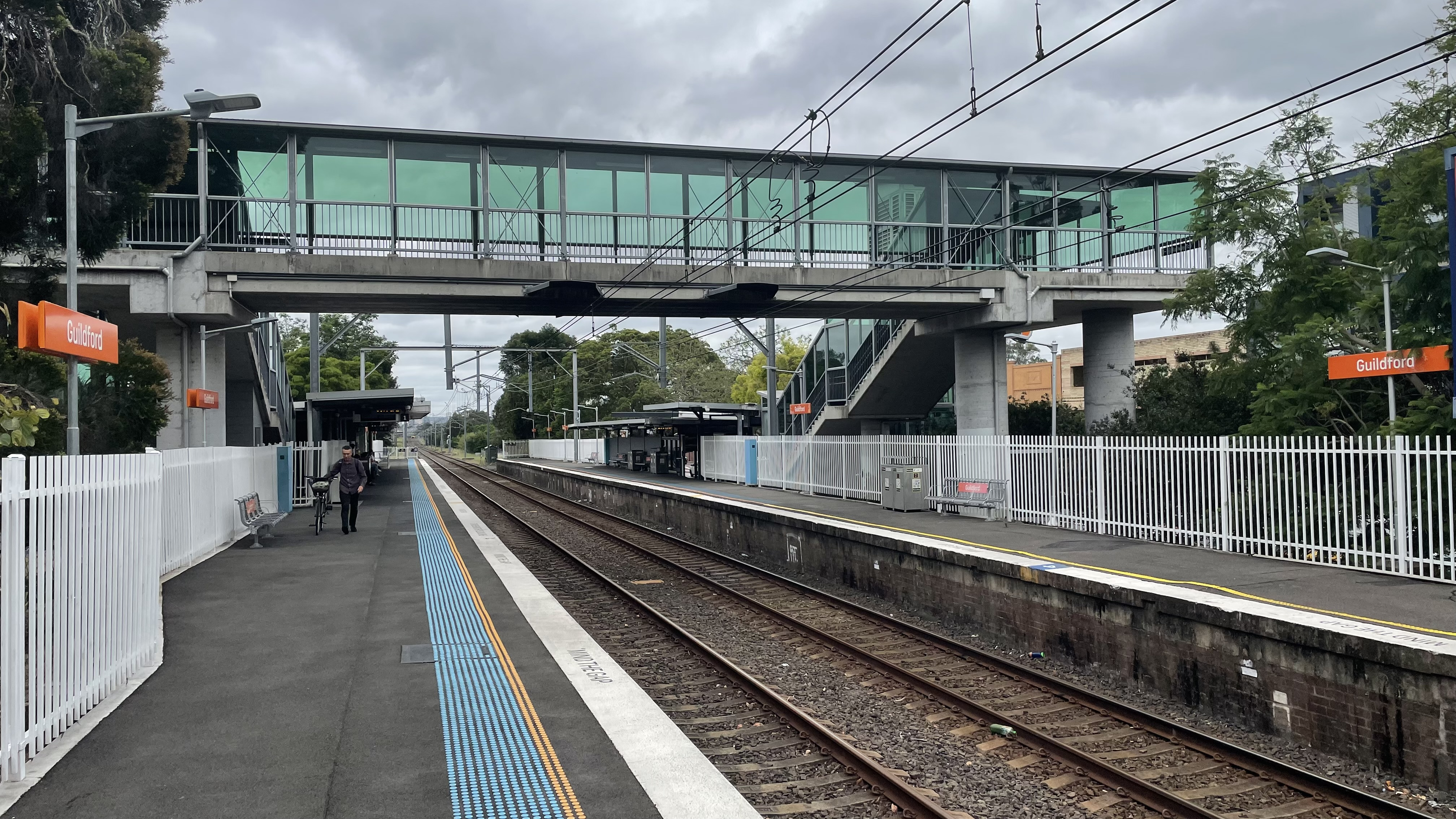
- Northbound view from Platform 1 in December 2024

General information
- Location: Military Road, Guildford; Sydney, New South Wales; Australia
- Coordinates: 33°51′16″S 150°59′04″E
- Elevation: 30 metres (98 ft)
- Owner: Transport Asset Manager of NSW
- Operator: Sydney Trains
- Line: Main Southern
- Distance: 25.72 km (15.98 mi) from Central
- Platforms: 2 (2 side)
- Tracks: 2
- Connections: Bus

Construction
- Structure type: Ground
- Accessible: Yes

Other information
- Status: Weekdays: Staffed: 6am–7pm: Weekends and public holidays: Staffed: 8am–4pm
- Station code: GUD
- Website: Transport for NSW

History
- Opened: April 1876 (150 years ago)
- Electrified: Yes (from 1930)

Passengers
- 2025: 1,458,650 (year); 3,996 (daily) (Sydney Trains)
- Rank: 101

Services
Preceding station	Sydney Trains	Following station
Yennora towards Leppington	Leppington & Inner West Line	Merrylands towards City Circle
Yennora towards Leppington	Cumberland Line	Merrylands towards Richmond
Location

Guildford railway station is a suburban railway station located on the Main Southern line, serving the Sydney suburb of Guildford. It is served by Sydney Trains T2 Leppington & Inner West Line and T5 Cumberland Line services.

== History ==
Guildford station opened in April 1876. In 2004, a new footbridge with lifts was built.

== Services ==
=== Platforms ===
Platform	Line	Stopping pattern	Notes
1	T2	services to Central & the City Circle	
1	T5	services to Blacktown, Schofields & Richmond	
2	T2	services to Leppington	
2	T5	services to Leppington weekend services to Liverpool	

=== Transport links ===
Transit Systems operates five bus routes via Guildford station:

- 820: to Merrylands station via Guildford West
- 821: to Woodpark via Guildford West
- 822: to Merrylands station via Railway Terrace
- 906: Fairfield station to Parramatta station
- 916: to Chester Hill station

Guildford station is served by one NightRide route:

- N60: Fairfield station to Town Hall station
