= Merrylands railway station =

Railway station in Sydney, New South Wales, Australia

Merrylands
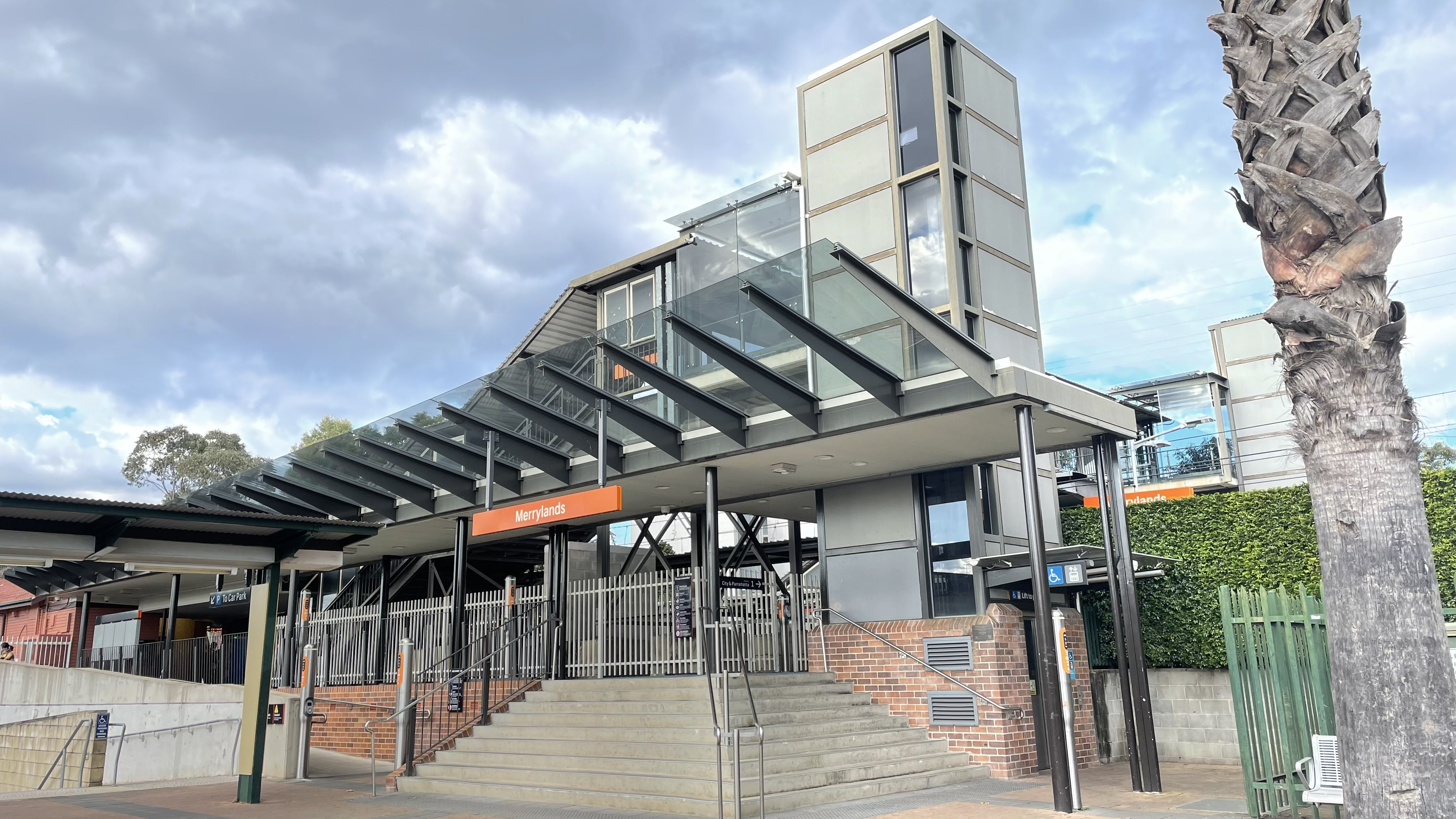
- Exterior view of the concourse in June 2022

General information
- Location: Railway Terrace, Merrylands; Sydney, New South Wales; Australia
- Coordinates: 33°50′11″S 150°59′35″E
- Elevation: 22 metres (72 ft)
- Owner: Transport Asset Manager of NSW
- Operator: Sydney Trains
- Line: Main Southern
- Distance: 23.47 km (14.58 mi) from Central
- Platforms: 2 (2 side)
- Tracks: 2
- Connections: Bus

Construction
- Structure type: Ground
- Accessible: Yes

Other information
- Status: Weekdays: Staffed: 6am–10pm: Weekends and public holidays: Staffed: 6am–7pm
- Station code: MLN
- Website: Transport for NSW

History
- Opened: 6 July 1878 (148 years ago)
- Electrified: Yes (from 1930)

Passengers
- 2025: 3,386,827 (year); 9,279 (daily) (Sydney Trains)
- Rank: 50

Services
Preceding station	Sydney Trains	Following station
Guildford towards Leppington	Leppington & Inner West Line	Granville towards City Circle
Guildford towards Leppington	Cumberland Line	Harris Park towards Richmond
Location

Merrylands railway station is a suburban railway station located on the Main Southern line, serving the Sydney suburb of Merrylands. It is served by the Sydney Trains T2 Leppington & Inner West and T5 Cumberland Line services.

== History ==
Merrylands station opened on 6 July 1878.

In 1969, the Merrylands Road level crossing to the south of the station was replaced by the Mombri Street overpass to the north. In 1972, the signal box at Merrylands closed with operations transferred to Granville signal box. On 2 November 1996, the Merrylands to Harris Park Y-Link opened allowing direct train operation between these two stations by what is now known as the Cumberland Line.

The station was upgraded in 2006, with lifts added for easy access.

Until at least the mid-1990s, sidings existed to the north-west of the station to serve a flour mill.

== Services ==
=== Platforms ===
Platform	Line	Stopping pattern	Notes
1	T2	services to Central & the City Circle	
1	T5	services to Blacktown, Schofields & Richmond	
2	T2	services to Leppington	
2	T5	services to Leppington weekend services to Liverpool	

=== Transport links ===
Merrylands Bus Interchange

Stand 1: Transit Systems

- 809: to Pemulwuy via Hilltop and South Wentworthville, then continues to Parramatta via route 811/811X
- 818: to Westmead via South Wentworthville

Stand 2: Transit Systems

- 806: to Liverpool via Greystanes, Prairiewood and Abbotsbury
- 810 and 810X: to Parramatta via Pemulwuy, Greystanes, South Wentworthville No difference between 810 and 810X until South Wentworthville

Stand 3: Transit Systems

- 908: to Bankstown via Auburn

Stand 4 Transit Systems

- 802: to Liverpool via Guildford West, Fairfield, Canley Heights, Bonnyrigg, Miller and Cartwright
- 804: to Liverpool via Guildford West, Fairfield, Greenfield Park, Hinchinbrook
- 820: to Guildford station via Bristol Street
- 822: Two weekday off-peak services to Guildford station via Railway Tce

Bus in Merrylands Road Transit Systems

- 802: to Parramatta via Pitt Street
- 804: to Parramatta via Pitt Street
- 806: to Parramatta via Pitt Street

Merrylands station is served by one Nightride route:

- N60: Fairfield station to City (Town Hall)

== Gallery ==
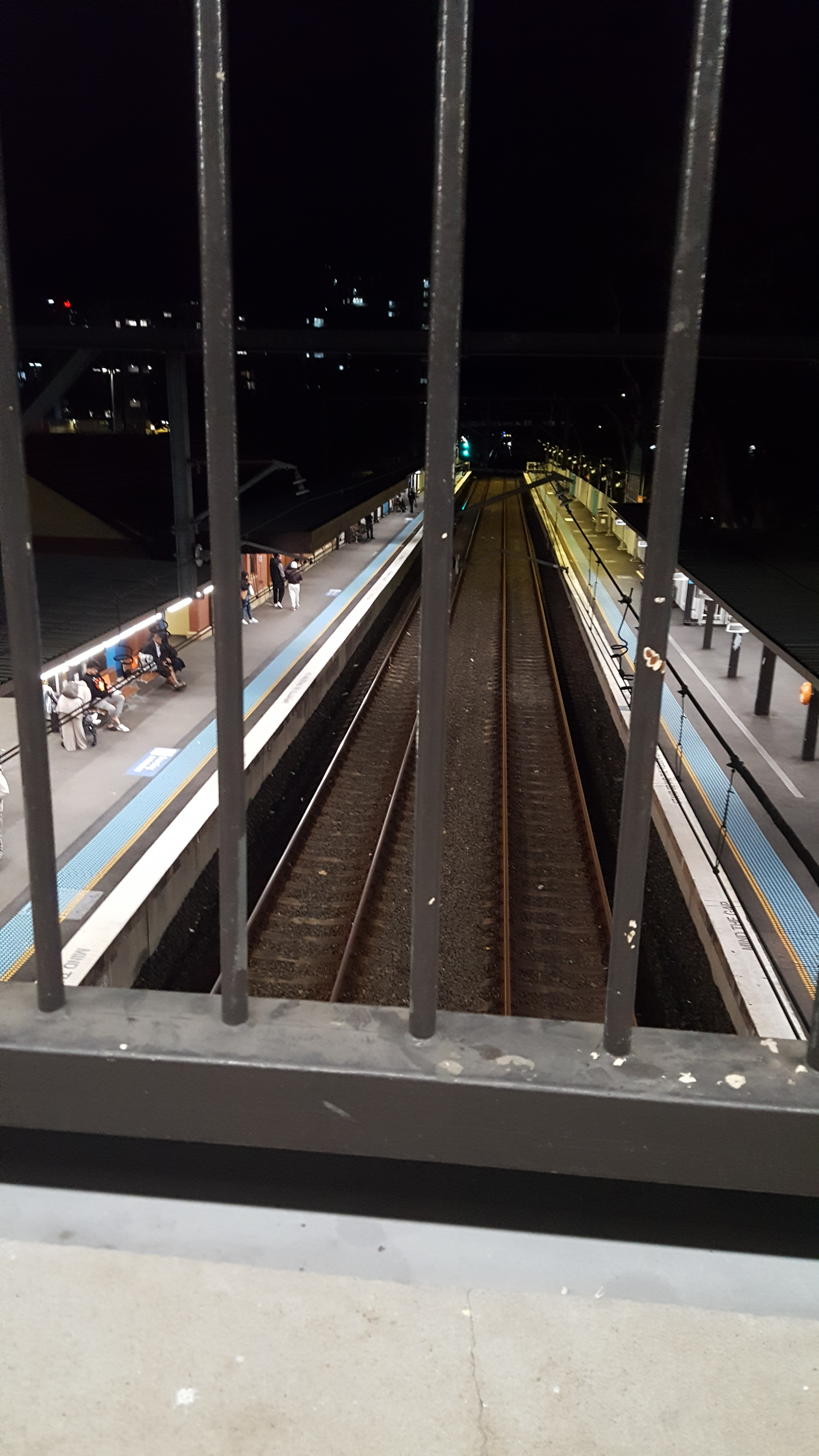
The top view of both platforms at night in June 2024

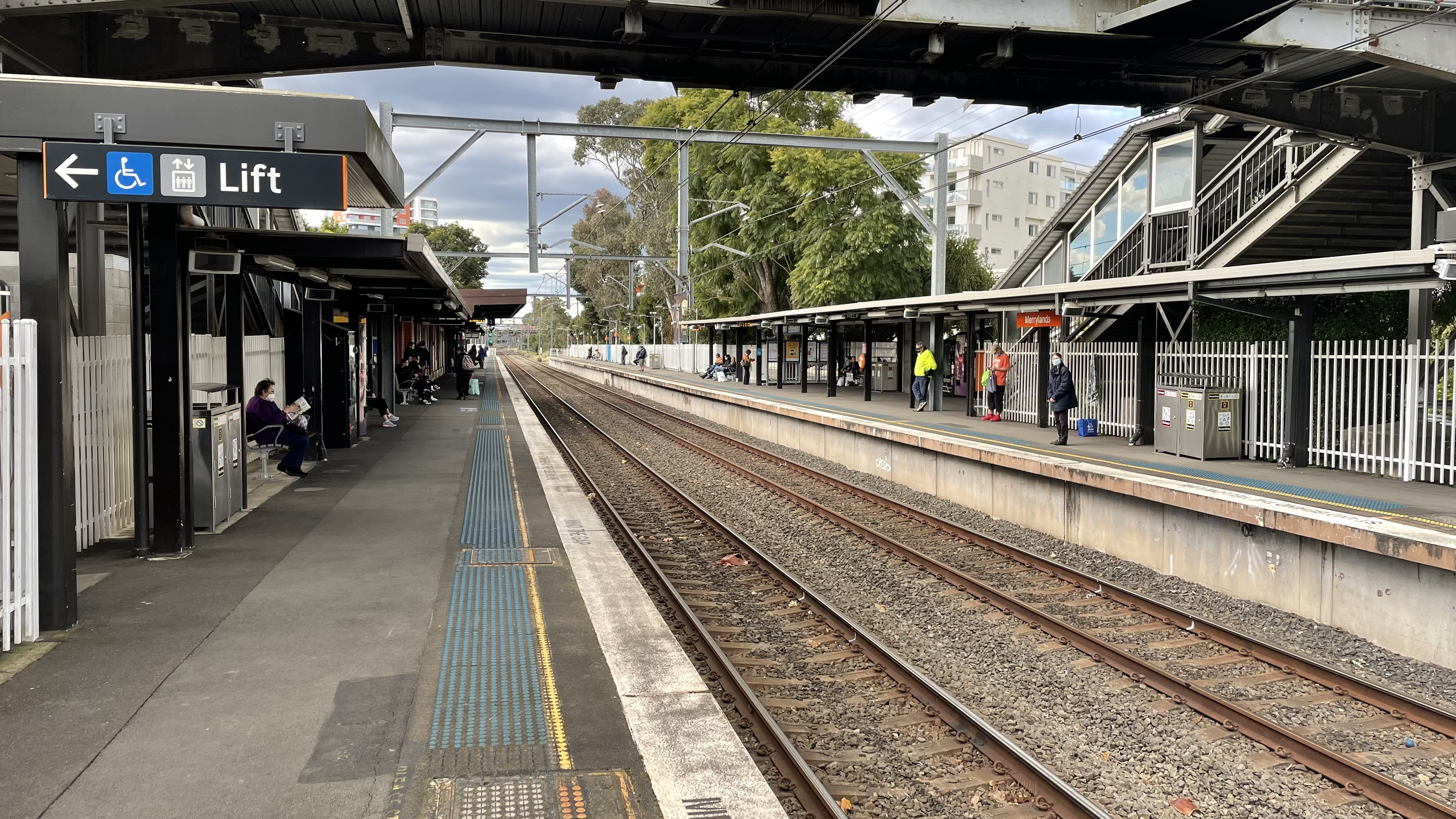
Northbound view from Platform 1 in June 2022
