= Yennora railway station =

Railway station in Sydney, New South Wales, Australia

Yennora
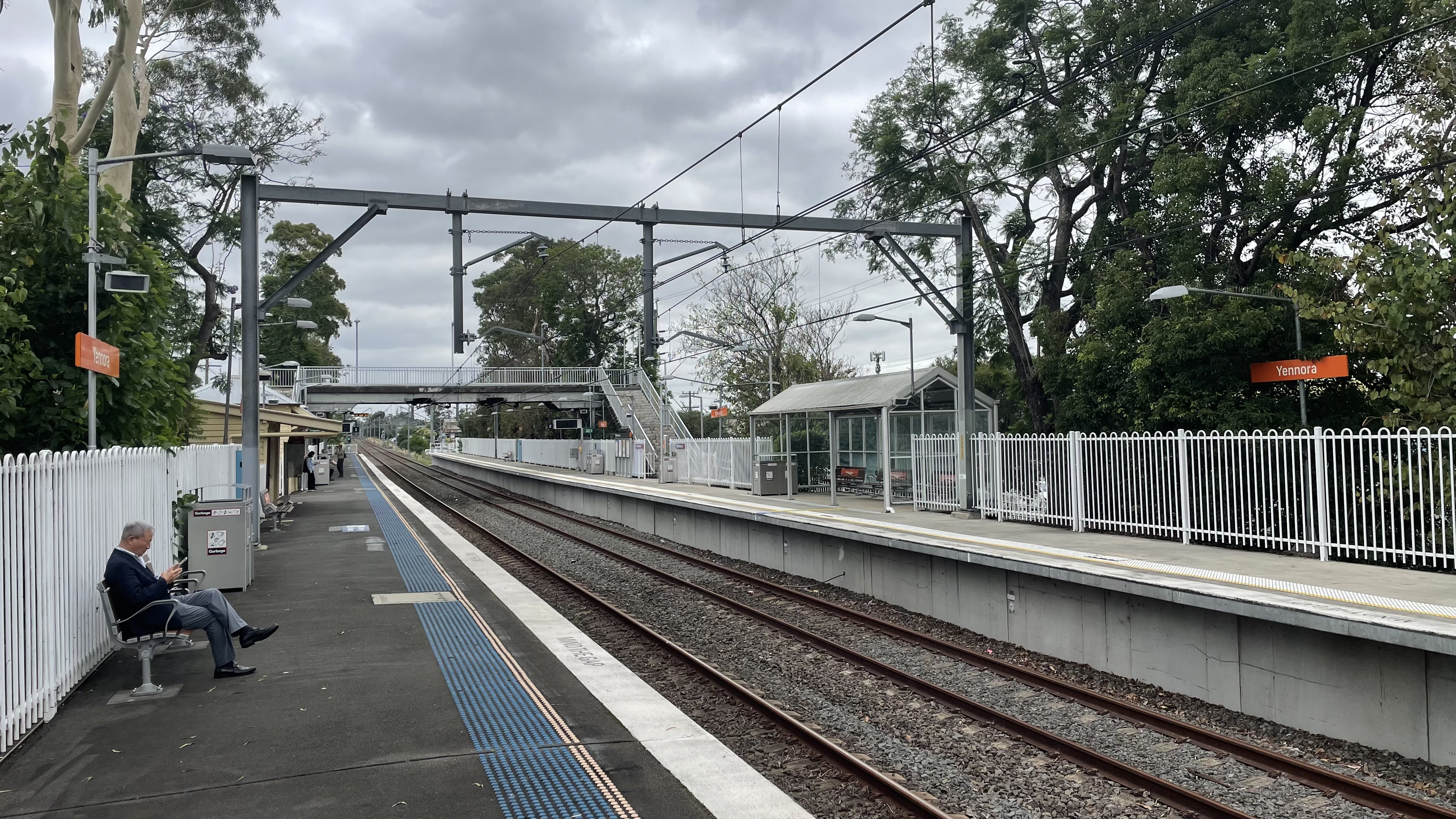
- Northbound view from Platform 1 in December 2024

General information
- Location: Railway Street, Yennora; Sydney, New South Wales; Australia
- Coordinates: 33°51′53″S 150°58′16″E
- Elevation: 21 metres (69 ft)
- Owner: Transport Asset Manager of NSW
- Operator: Sydney Trains
- Line: Main Southern
- Distance: 27.44 km (17.05 mi) from Central
- Platforms: 2 (2 side)
- Tracks: 2
- Connections: Bus

Construction
- Structure type: Ground
- Accessible: No

Other information
- Status: Weekdays: Staffed: 6am to 2pm: Weekends and public holidays: Unstaffed
- Station code: YNR
- Website: Transport for NSW

History
- Opened: 6 November 1927 (98 years ago)
- Electrified: Yes (from 1930)

Passengers
- 2023: 605,740 (year); 1,660 (daily) (Sydney Trains, NSW TrainLink)

Services
Preceding station	Sydney Trains	Following station
Fairfield towards Leppington	Leppington & Inner West Line	Guildford towards City Circle
Fairfield towards Leppington	Cumberland Line	Guildford towards Richmond
Location

Yennora railway station is a suburban railway station located on the Main Southern line, serving the Sydney suburb of Yennora. It is served by Sydney Trains T2 Leppington & Inner West Line and T5 Cumberland Line services.

== History ==
Yennora station opened on 6 November 1927 as an infill station, and was funded by the local McCredie family who were interested in land in the vicinity. The funding was provided with hopes the station would 'open up' access to the area, and on the initial condition that the cost of the station would be refunded when profits over three years justified such a refund.

== Services ==
=== Platforms ===
Platform	Line	Stopping pattern	Notes
1	T2	services to Central & the City Circle	
1	T5	services to Blacktown, Schofields and Richmond	
2	T2	services to Leppington	
2	T5	services to Leppington weekend services to Liverpool	

=== Transport links ===
Yennora station is served by one NightRide route:

- N60: Fairfield station to Town Hall station
