= Granville railway station =

Railway station in Sydney, New South Wales, Australia

Granville
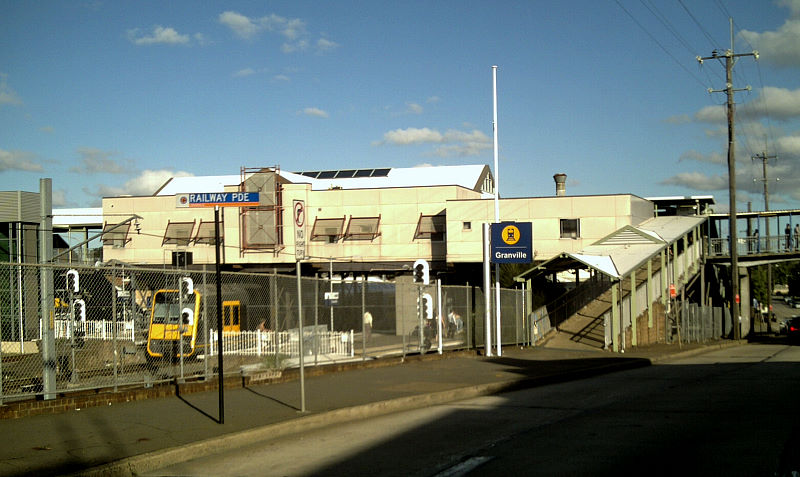
- Station building and entrance in February 2007

General information
- Location: Bridge Street, Granville; Sydney, New South Wales; Australia
- Coordinates: 33°50′00″S 151°00′45″E
- Elevation: 12 metres (39 ft)
- Owner: Transport Asset Manager of NSW
- Operator: Sydney Trains
- Lines: Main Suburban; Main Western; Main South
- Distance: 21.22 km (13.19 mi) from Central
- Platforms: 4 (2 island)
- Tracks: 4
- Connections: Bus

Construction
- Structure type: Ground
- Accessible: Yes

Other information
- Status: Staffed
- Station code: GAV
- Website: Transport for NSW

History
- Opened: 2 July 1860 (166 years ago)
- Rebuilt: 1880; 1960
- Electrified: Yes (from 1928)
- Former names: Parramatta Junction (1860–1880)

Passengers
- 2025: 4,163,749 (year); 11,408 (daily) (Sydney Trains)
- Rank: 42

Services
Preceding station	Sydney Trains	Following station
Harris Park towards Penrith	North Shore & Western Line Weekday limited and weekends only	Clyde towards Berowra
Parramatta towards Richmond	North Shore & Western Line	Lidcombe towards Berowra
Harris Park Weekdays only towards Parramatta	Leppington & Inner West Line	Clyde towards City Circle
Merrylands towards Leppington	Leppington & Inner West Line	Clyde towards City Circle
Location

Granville railway station is a suburban railway station located on the Main Suburban line, serving the Sydney suburb of Granville. It is served by Sydney Trains T1 Western Line and T2 Leppington & Inner West Line services. It is the junction for the Main Western line and the Main South line.

== History ==
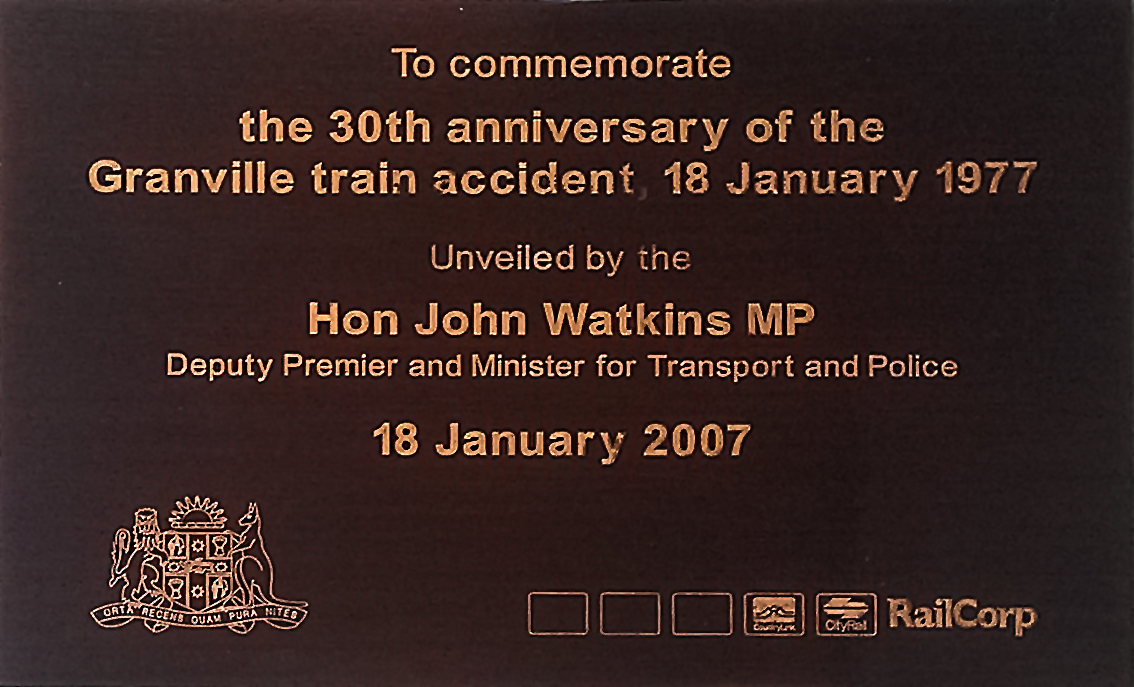
Plaque commemorating the Granville railway disaster

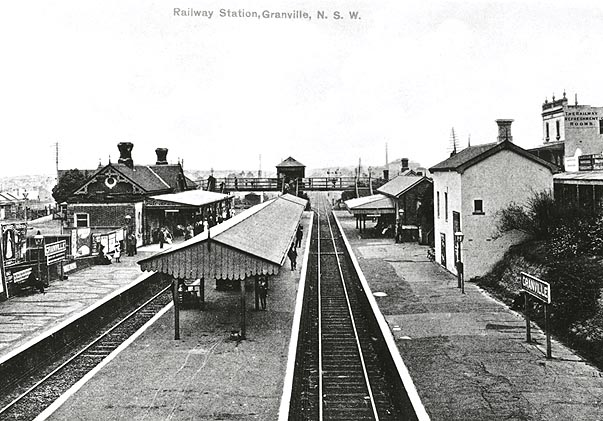
The station in 1890

Granville station opened on 2 July 1860 as Parramatta Junction, and is close to the original terminus of the first railway line in New South Wales which was completed in 1855. On 1 September 1880 it was relocated to its present location and renamed Granville.

Granville Junction lies immediately to the west of the station and is the junction point of the Main Western and the original Main South lines, now referred to as the Old Main South after the opening of the Lidcombe to Cabramatta bypass.

As part of the quadruplication of the Main Suburban line from Lidcombe, the station was rebuilt in the 1950s.

On 18 January 1977, the Granville railway disaster, Australia's worst rail disaster, occurred resulting in the death of 84 people, approximately 200 metres (656 ft) west of the station.

On the station's northern side lay a parcel's dock and siding. This was removed in August 1990.

Granville has traditionally served as a transfer station, a role that has been diluted since the construction of a 'Y-link' track between the neighbouring Harris Park and Merrylands stations. Since 1996, this track has allowed direct travel between the Main Western and Main South lines via the Cumberland Line.

== Services ==
=== Platforms ===
Platform	Line	Stopping pattern	Notes
1	North Shore & Western Line	Services to North Sydney, Hornsby & Berowra	
2	North Shore & Western Line	Services to Penrith, Schofields and Richmond	
3	North Shore & Western Line	Services to North Sydney and Lindfield	Weekends only
3	Leppington & Inner West Line	Services to Central & the City Circle	
4	North Shore & Western Line	Services to Penrith, Schofields and Richmond	Weekends only
4	Leppington & Inner West Line	Services to Parramatta & Leppington	Parramatta services only run on weekdays.

=== Transport links ===
Transit Systems NSW operates three bus routes via Granville railway station, under contract to Transport for NSW:

- 906: Parramatta station to Fairfield station
- M91: Parramatta station to Hurstville
- S2: to Sefton

Granville station is served by one NightRide route:

- N60: Fairfield station to Town Hall station

== Trackplan ==
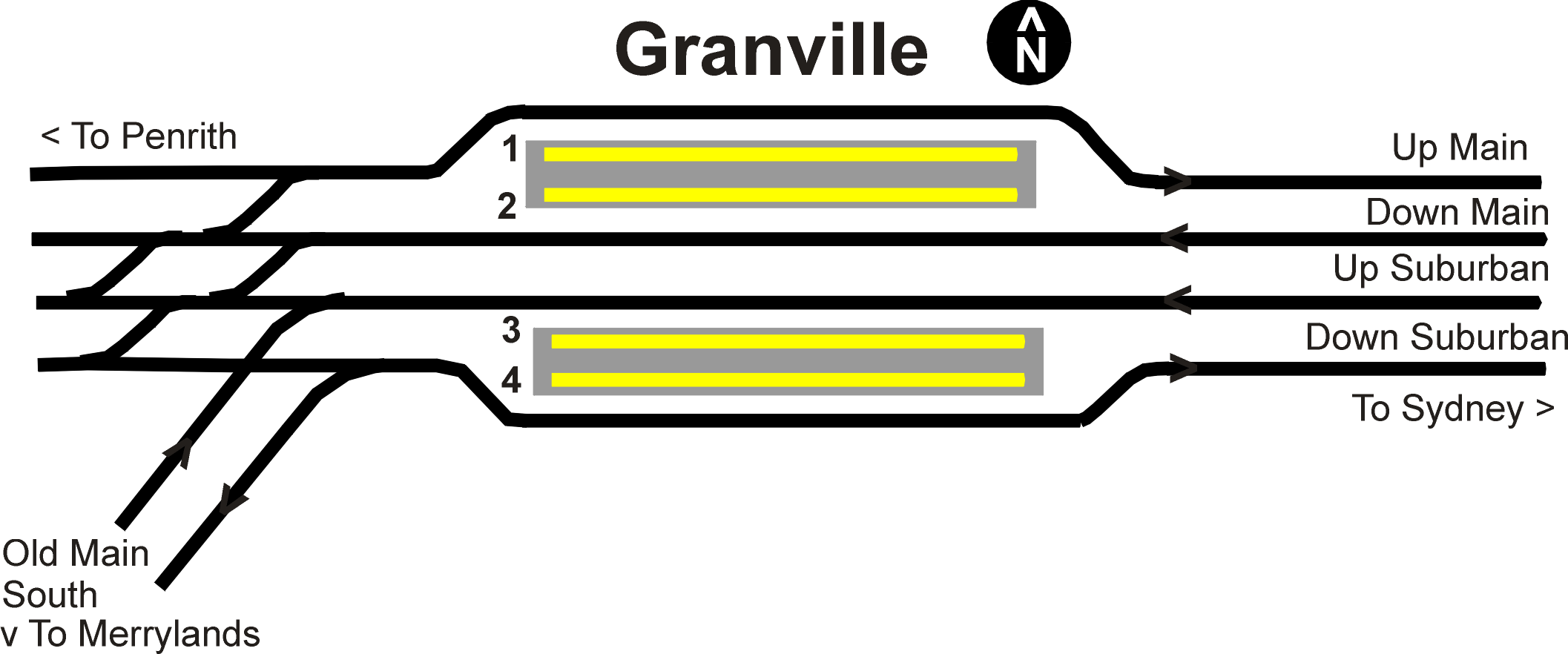
Track layout
