= Harris Park railway station =

Railway station in Sydney, New South Wales, Australia

Harris Park
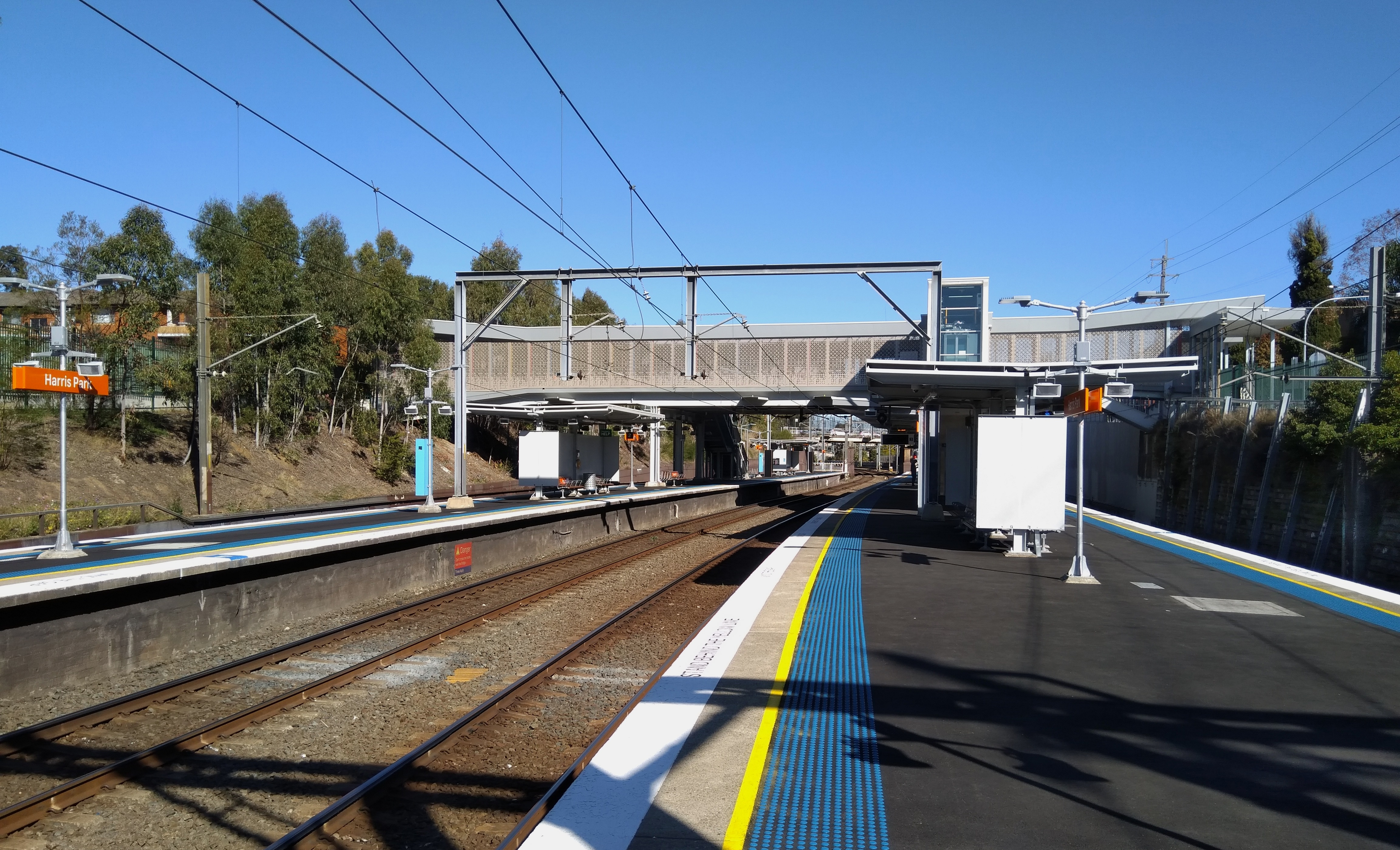
- Southbound view of platform and concourse in August 2018

General information
- Location: Station Street, Harris Park; Sydney, New South Wales; Australia
- Coordinates: 33°49′24″S 151°00′28″E
- Elevation: 20 metres (66 ft)
- Owner: Transport Asset Manager of NSW
- Operator: Sydney Trains
- Line: Main Western
- Distance: 22.53 km (14.00 mi) from Central
- Platforms: 4 (2 island)
- Tracks: 4

Construction
- Structure type: Ground
- Accessible: Partial (platforms 3 and 4 only)

Other information
- Status: Weekdays: Staffed: 6am to 7pm: Weekends and public holidays: Unstaffed
- Station code: HPK
- Website: Transport for NSW

History
- Opened: c.1885 (141 years ago)
- Electrified: Yes (from May 1929)

Passengers
- 2025: 1,508,827; 4,134 (daily) (Sydney Trains)
- Rank: 93

Services
Preceding station	Sydney Trains	Following station
Parramatta towards Penrith	T1 North Shore & Western Line Weekday limited and weekends only	Granville towards Berowra
Parramatta Terminus	T2 Leppington & Inner West Line Weekdays only	Granville towards City Circle
Parramatta towards Richmond	T5 Cumberland Line	Merrylands towards Leppington
Location

Harris Park railway station is a suburban railway station located on the Main Western line, serving the Sydney suburb of Harris Park. It is served by Sydney Trains T1 Western Line, T2 Leppington & Inner West Line and T5 Cumberland Line services.

== History ==
Harris Park station initially opened as a platform in the late 1800s, although it only received timetabled services from 4 March 1885. Originally built as two side platforms, both were rebuilt as island platforms during the quadruplication of the Granville to Westmead line in the mid-1980s. On 2 November 1996, the Harris Park to Merrylands Y-Link opened allowing direct train operation between these two stations by what is now known as the Cumberland Line.

On 30 June 2013, a landslide occurred and a retaining wall collapsed in heavy rain, burying one track and partially covering platform 4.

An accessibility upgrade, including lift access to the station, was announced in 2015.

== Services ==
=== Platforms ===
Platform	Line	Stopping pattern	Notes
1	T1 North Shore & Western Line	occasional early morning & late night services to Hornsby & Berowra	infrequently used
2	T1 North Shore & Western Line	weekday early morning & late night services to Penrith	infrequently used
3	T1 North Shore & Western Line	services to North Sydney, Chatswood and Lindfield	weekends only
3	T2 Leppington & Inner West Line	weekday services to the City Circle	
3	T5 Cumberland Line	services to Leppington and Liverpool	
4	T1 North Shore & Western Line	services to Penrith	weekends & late nights only
4	T2 Leppington & Inner West Line	weekday services to Parramatta	
4	T5 Cumberland Line	services to Schofields and Richmond	

== Trackplan ==
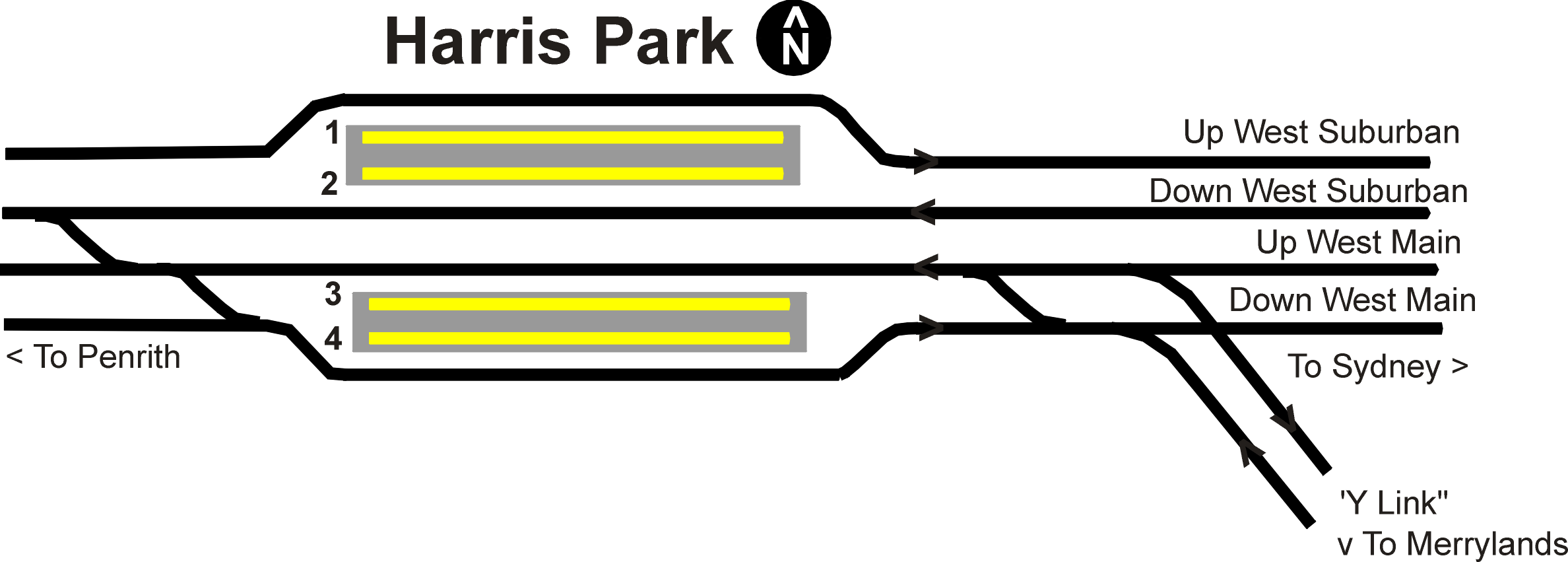
Track layout, the junction to the Y-Link is actually a double ladder junction and the facing (right hand) crossover does not exist

== Gallery ==
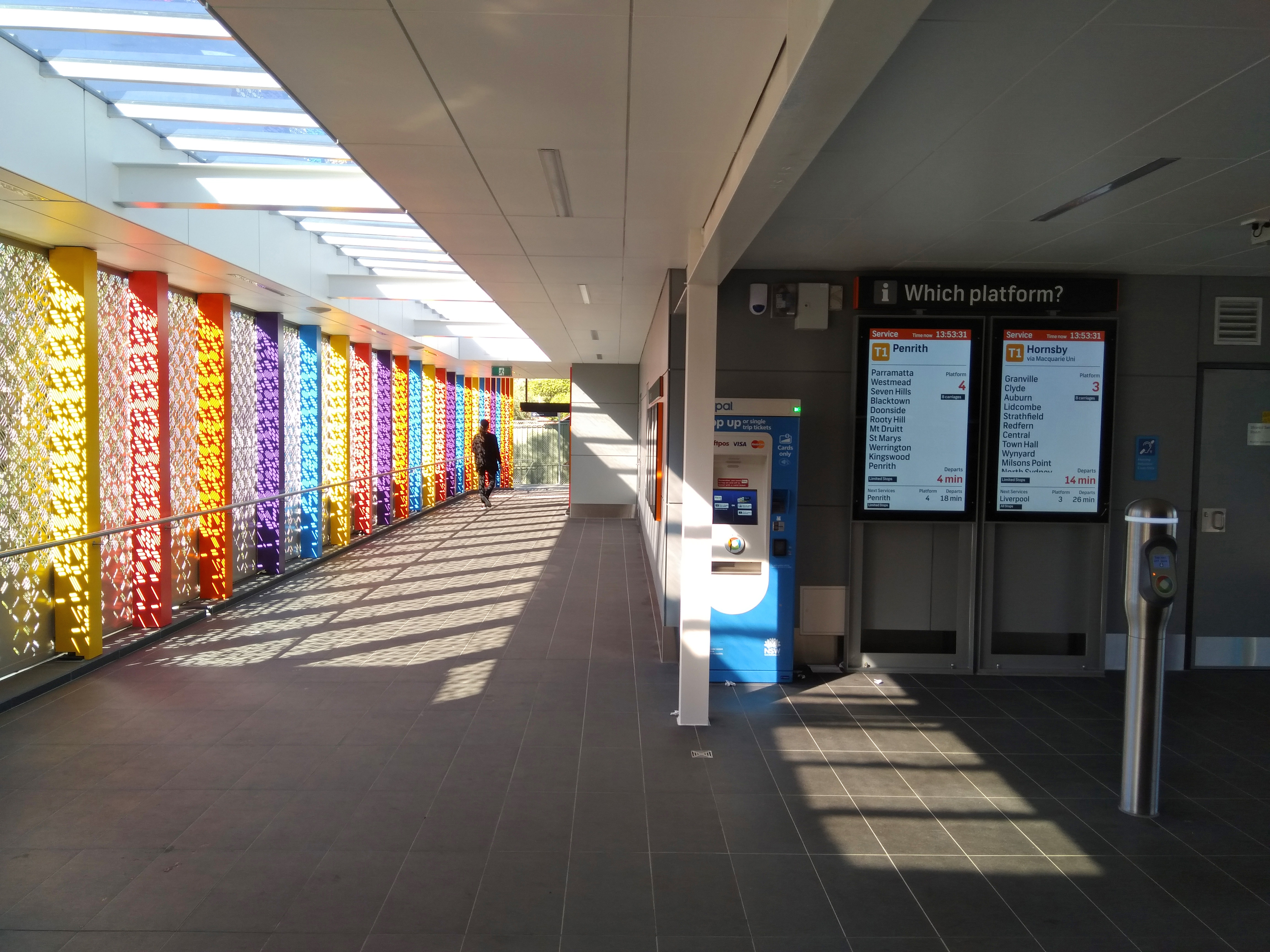
Footbridge and concourse in August 2018

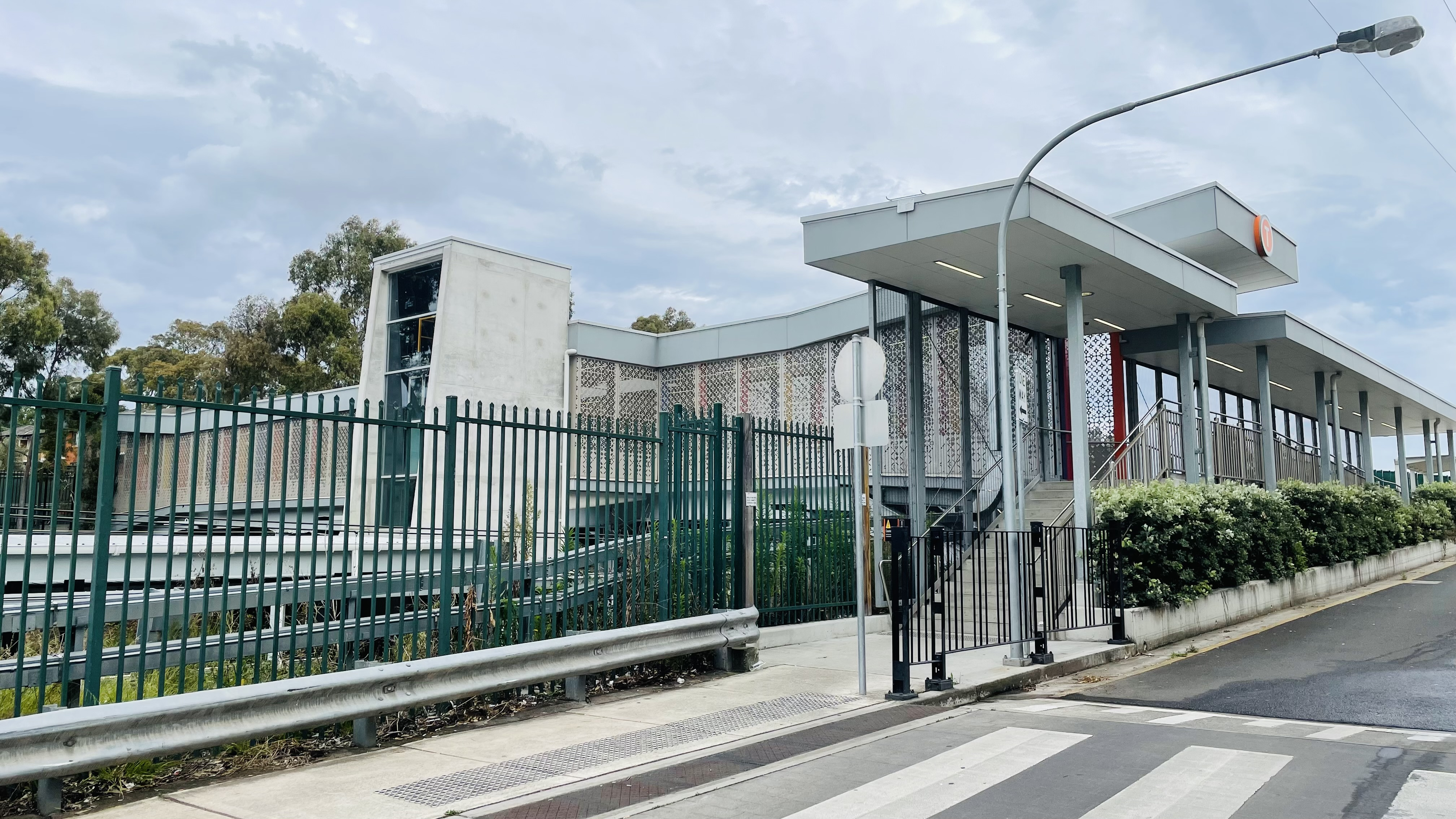
Entrance on Station Street in October 2022
