= T2 Leppington & Inner West Line =

Rail service in Sydney, New South Wales, Australia

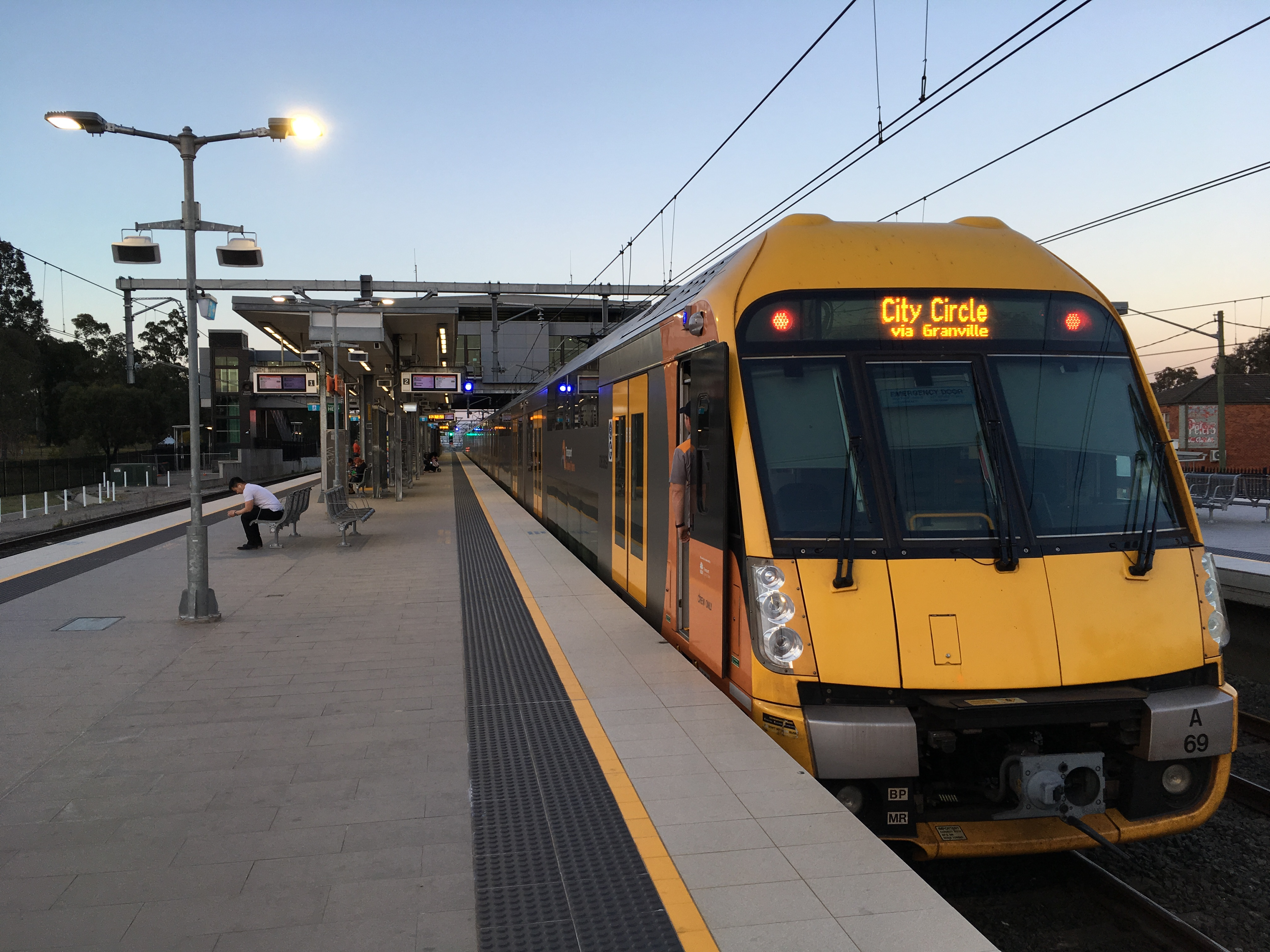
- An A set at Glenfield

Overview
- Service type: Commuter rail service
- Status: Operational
- Locale: Sydney, New South Wales
- Predecessor: South (1999–2013); Airport, Inner West & South (2013–2017)
- First service: 26 November 2017; 8 years ago
- Current operator: Sydney Trains

Route
- Termini: City Circle; Leppington; Parramatta
- Stops: 37
- Average journey time: 1h 29m (Leppington to Museum) 59m (Parramatta to Museum) (Weekday off peak times, journey times vary based on stopping pattern and time)
- Lines used: City Circle; Main Suburban; Old Main South; Main South; South West Rail Link

On-board services
- Disabled access: Yes

Technical
- Rolling stock: T, M, A and B sets
- Track gauge: 1,435 mm (4 ft 8 1/2 in) standard gauge
- Electrification: 1,500 V DC from overhead catenary
- Track owner: Transport Asset Manager of New South Wales
- Timetable number: T2
Sydney rail network
Sydney Trains suburban services
T1 North Shore & Western
T2 Leppington & Inner West
T3 Liverpool & Inner West
T4 Eastern Suburbs & Illawarra
T5 Cumberland
T6 Lidcombe & Bankstown
T7 Olympic Park
T8 Airport & South
T9 Northern
Sydney Metro
M1 Metro North West & Bankstown

The T2 Leppington & Inner West Line is a suburban rail service operated by Sydney Trains, serving the inner west and south-western suburbs of Sydney, Australia. The service commences from the City Circle, heading west to Granville where the line branches; services either head northwest to Parramatta or south to Leppington. A third terminus at Homebush is also used when the part-time Parramatta branch is not operating.

Since 2013 the line has been numbered T2 and is coloured light blue on maps and wayfinding information.

In March 2025, the federal minister for infrastructure, transport, regional development and local government Catherine King announced that a business case for upgrading the T2 Leppington & Inner West Line would be developed.

== History ==
=== Creation in 2013 ===
Following the 2011 state election, the newly elected O'Farrell government embarked on reform of transport in New South Wales, creating a new organisation, Transport for NSW, in November of that year. This was followed up with another government reform, which saw Sydney Trains take over operation of the Sydney suburban rail network from CityRail in July 2013.

Transport for NSW developed a new rail timetable and branding, which was put into effect on 20 October 2013. This saw three former CityRail services, the Airport & East Hills Line (Macarthur – City Circle via Sydney Airport or Sydenham), the Inner West Line (Liverpool or Bankstown – City Circle via Regents Park) and the South Line (Campbelltown – City Circle via Granville), merged to form the Airport, Inner West & South Line. A new numbering system was also introduced and the new line was given the number T2.

The 2013 timetable was designed to integrate the projects of the Rail Clearways Program, a 2004 plan to divide the network's fourteen metropolitan rail lines into five independent "clearways" by installing extra tracks, passing loops, turnouts and turnbacks at pinch points around the network, such as at Homebush and Lidcombe. By 2013, the Rail Clearways Program was substantially complete. At the same time, the delivery of 78 new Waratah trains was almost complete as well.

=== Leppington extension in 2015 ===
A branch of the service along the South West railway line to Leppington commenced operating on 13 December 2015, following the new rail link's completion earlier that year. T2 services replaced an earlier temporary shuttle service between Leppington and Liverpool.

=== Split with T8 in 2017 ===
A new Sydney Trains timetable was introduced on 26 November 2017, in which the original T2 services were split in two. Existing services from Leppington to the City Circle via Granville, alongside newly extended all stops services from Parramatta that had previously terminated at Homebush, were rebranded as the T2 Inner West & Leppington Line. This reduced T2 was recoloured light blue, harkening back to CityRail's historical colour scheme for services along this route.

Meanwhile, former T2 services from Macarthur to the City Circle via East Hills were rebranded as the T8 Airport & South Line, moving to a new number but keeping the original T2's green colour, again aligning with the former CityRail colour scheme for services via East Hills. Despite the separation in branding, the T2 and T8 remain operationally linked, with services from one generally through-running onto the other upon reaching the City Circle.

=== Renaming in 2024 ===
Timetabling changes in 2024 saw the name reordered to be T2 Leppington & Inner West Line. This coincided with the redesignation of T3 services as the Liverpool & Inner West Line, following their realignment to run alongside T2 services via Strathfield rather than via Bankstown as they had previously.

== Rolling stock ==
- New South Wales A and B sets 8-car EMUs
- New South Wales T set 8-car EMUs – Weekends only
- New South Wales M set 8-car EMUs – Weekdays only
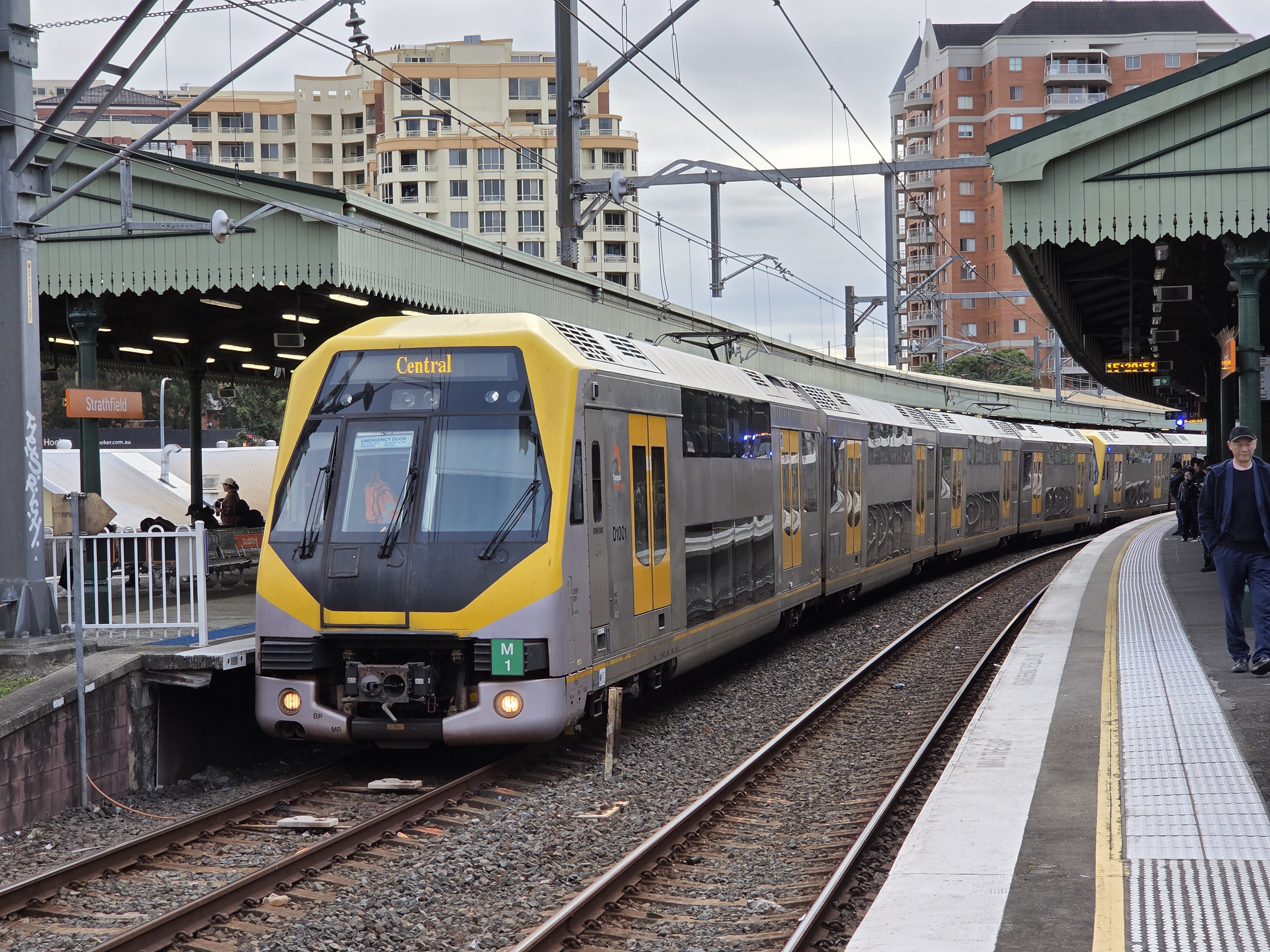
New South Wales Millennium M set

== Services ==
The line usually runs on two stopping patterns. The first stopping pattern runs to Leppington, making limited stops between Redfern and Granville, with the specific stopping pattern depending on the time of day. The second stopping pattern makes all stops between Redfern and Homebush, where some trains on the "inner west" stopping pattern terminate. Some services continue all stations to Parramatta or to Liverpool via the T3. These two patterns both run at 4tph (trains per hour) during the off-peak, with additional services from Leppington during the peaks.

=== Map ===
T2 interactive map

=== Stations ===
Legend: Adjacent to a Metro station, Adjacent to a Light Rail station

List of T2 Leppington and Inner West Line stations
T2 Leppington and Inner West
Station	Image	Suburb	Opened	Grade	Connections
Museum	Railway station	Sydney CBD	20 December 1926	Underground	T3 Liverpool & Inner West Line T8 Airport & South Line
St James	Railway station	Sydney CBD	20 December 1926	Underground	T3 Liverpool & Inner West Line T8 Airport & South Line
Circular Quay	Railway station	Sydney CBD	20 January 1956	Elevated	T3 Liverpool & Inner West Line T8 Airport & South Line
Wynyard	Railway station	Sydney CBD	28 February 1932	Underground	T1 North Shore & Western Line T3 Liverpool & Inner West Line T8 Airport & South Line T9 Northern Line CBD and South East Light Rail Central Coast & Newcastle Line
Town Hall	Railway station	Sydney CBD	28 February 1932	Underground	T1 North Shore & Western Line T3 Liverpool & Inner West Line T4 Eastern Suburbs & Illawarra Line T8 Airport & South Line T9 Northern Line CBD and South East Light Rail Central Coast & Newcastle Line
Central	Metro station	Sydney CBD	5 August 1906	Ground	M1 Metro North West & Bankstown Line T1 North Shore & Western Line T3 Liverpool & Inner West Line T4 Eastern Suburbs & Illawarra Line T8 Airport & South Line T9 Northern Line Dulwich Hill Line CBD and South East Light Rail Blue Mountains Line Central Coast & Newcastle Line South Coast Line
Redfern	Railway station	Redfern	1876	Ground	T1 North Shore & Western Line T3 Liverpool & Inner West Line T4 Eastern Suburbs & Illawarra Line T8 Airport & South Line T9 Northern Line Blue Mountains Line Central Coast & Newcastle Line South Coast Line Southern Highlands Line
Macdonaldtown	Railway station	Eveleigh	3 April 1892	Ground	T3 Liverpool & Inner West Line
Newtown	Railway station	Newtown	26 September 1855	Ground	T3 Liverpool & Inner West Line
Stanmore	Railway station	Stanmore	7 October 1878	Ground	T3 Liverpool & Inner West Line
Petersham	Railway station	Petersham	6 January 1857	Ground	T3 Liverpool & Inner West Line
Lewisham	Railway station	Lewisham	1886	Ground	T3 Liverpool & Inner West Line
Summer Hill	Railway station	Summer Hill	15 September 1879	Ground	T3 Liverpool & Inner West Line
Ashfield	Railway station	Ashfield	26 September 1855	Ground	T3 Liverpool & Inner West Line
Croydon	Railway station	Croydon	7 January 1875	Ground	T3 Liverpool & Inner West Line
Burwood	Railway station	Burwood	26 September 1855	Ground	T3 Liverpool & Inner West Line T9 Northern Line
Strathfield	Railway station	Strathfield	9 July 1876	Ground	T1 North Shore & Western Line T3 Liverpool & Inner West Line T9 Northern Line Blue Mountains Line Central Coast & Newcastle Line
Homebush	Railway station	Homebush	26 September 1855	Ground	T3 Liverpool & Inner West Line
Flemington	Railway station	Flemington	1884	Ground	T3 Liverpool & Inner West Line
Lidcombe	Railway station	Lidcombe	1 November 1858	Ground	T1 North Shore & Western Line T3 Liverpool & Inner West Line T6 Lidcombe & Bankstown Line Olympic Park railway line
Auburn	Railway station	Auburn	1877	Ground	T1 North Shore & Western Line
Clyde	Railway station	Clyde	1882	Ground	T1 North Shore & Western Line
Granville	Railway station	Granville	2 July 1860	Ground	T1 North Shore & Western Line
At Granville, the line branches. On weekdays a western branch goes towards Parramatta, and the South-Western branch is towards Leppington.
To Parramatta
Harris Park	Railway station	Harris Park	1885	Ground	T1 North Shore & Western Line T5 Cumberland Line
Parramatta	Railway station	Parramatta	2 July 1860	Ground	T1 North Shore & Western Line T5 Cumberland Line Parramatta Light Rail Blue Mountains Line
To Leppington
Merrylands	Railway station	Merrylands	6 July 1878	Ground	T5 Cumberland Line
Guildford	Railway station	Guildford	April 1876	Ground	T5 Cumberland Line
Yennora	Railway station	Yennora	6 November 1927	Ground	T5 Cumberland Line
Fairfield	Railway station	Fairfield	26 September 1856	Ground	T5 Cumberland Line
Canley Vale	Railway station	Canley Vale	15 April 1878	Ground	T5 Cumberland Line
Cabramatta	Railway station	Cabramatta	1870	Ground	T3 Liverpool & Inner West Line T5 Cumberland Line
Warwick Farm	Railway station	Warwick Farm	18 March 1889	Ground	T3 Liverpool & Inner West Line T5 Cumberland Line
Liverpool	Railway station	Warwick Farm	26 September 1856	Ground	T3 Liverpool & Inner West Line T5 Cumberland Line
Casula	Railway station	Casula	1 November 1894	Ground	T5 Cumberland Line
Glenfield	Railway station	Glenfield	25 May 1924	Ground	T5 Cumberland Line T8 Airport & South Line
Edmondson Park	Railway station	Edmondson Park	8 February 2015	Ground	T5 Cumberland Line
Leppington	Railway station	Leppington	8 February 2015	Ground	T5 Cumberland Line

=== Patronage ===
The following table shows the patronage of Sydney Trains network for the year ending 30 June 2024.

2025–26 Sydney Trains patronage by line (Note: Figures based on Opal tap on and tap off data)
T1 North Shore & Western Line	79,173,811	
T2 Leppington & Inner West Line	56,339,459	
T3 Liverpool & Inner West Line	11,756,216	(Note: T3 patronage split between former route via Bankstown and current route via Strathfield. The Bankstown route closed 30 September 2024.)
T4 Eastern Suburbs & Illawarra Line	63,990,365	
T5 Cumberland Line	7,629,714	
T6 Lidcombe & Bankstown Line	3,307,374	
Olympic Park railway line	2,400,479	
T8 Airport & South Line	54,235,162	
T9 Northern Line	39,379,659	

== See also ==
- Liverpool & Inner West Line
