= Parramatta railway station =

Railway station in Sydney, New South Wales, Australia

Parramatta
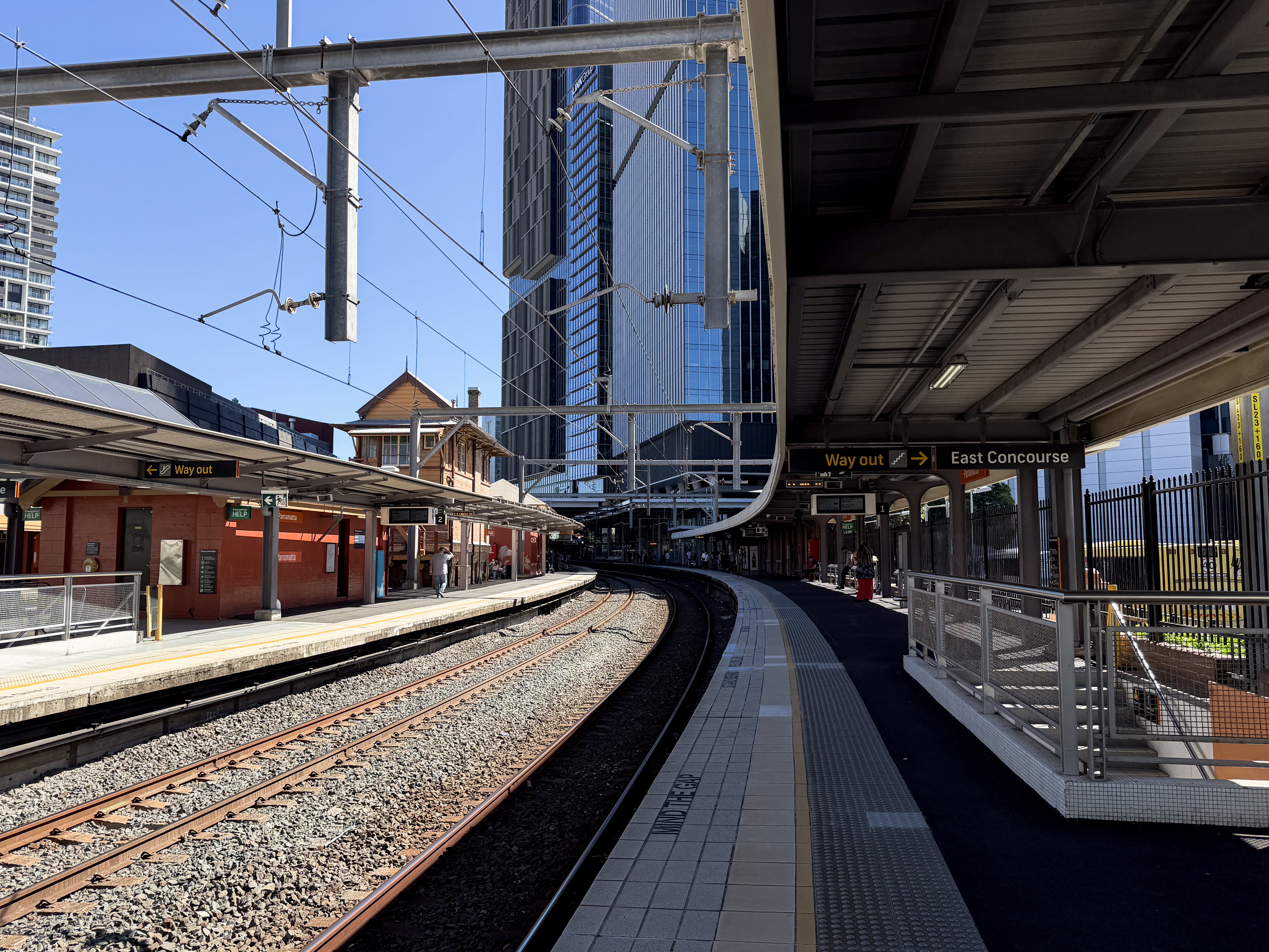
- Westbound view from Platform 1, April 2026

General information
- Location: Argyle Street, Parramatta; Australia
- Coordinates: 33°49′04″S 151°00′20″E
- Elevation: 21 metres (69 ft)
- Owner: Transport Asset Manager of New South Wales
- Operator: Sydney Trains
- Line: Main Western
- Distance: 23.21 kilometres (14.42 mi) from Central
- Platforms: 4 (2 side, 1 island)
- Tracks: 4
- Connections: Bus Parramatta Square

Construction
- Structure type: Ground
- Accessible: Yes

Other information
- Status: Staffed
- Station code: PAR
- Website: Transport for NSW

History
- Opened: 2 July 1860
- Rebuilt: 2003–2006

Passengers
- 2025: 22,709,554 (year); 62,218 (daily) (Sydney Trains)
- Rank: 4

Services
Preceding station	Sydney Trains	Following station
Westmead towards Emu Plains or Richmond	North Shore & Western Line Weekday limited and weekends only	Harris Park towards Berowra
Westmead towards Emu Plains or Richmond	North Shore & Western Line	Granville towards Berowra
Westmead towards Emu Plains or Richmond	North Shore & Western Line	Lidcombe towards Berowra
Westmead towards Schofields or Richmond	North Shore & Western Line Weekday peak only	Strathfield towards Berowra
Seven Hills towards Penrith or Emu Plains	North Shore & Western Line Weekday peak only	Strathfield towards Berowra
Terminus	Leppington & Inner West Line Weekdays only	Harris Park towards City Circle
Westmead towards Richmond	Cumberland Line	Harris Park towards Leppington
Preceding station	Intercity Trains	Following station
Blacktown towards Lithgow	Blue Mountains Line	Strathfield towards Central
Westmead towards Bathurst	Blue Mountains Line (twice daily) Bathurst Bullet	Central Terminus
Preceding station	NSW TrainLink	Following station
Blacktown towards Dubbo	NSW TrainLink Western Line Dubbo XPT	Strathfield towards Sydney
Penrith towards Broken Hill	NSW TrainLink Western Line Broken Hill Outback Xplorer	Strathfield towards Sydney
Location

Parramatta railway station is a heritage-listed railway station located on the Main Western line, serving Parramatta in western Sydney, New South Wales, Australia. It is served by Sydney Trains' T1 North Shore & Western Line, T2 Leppington & Inner West Line, T5 Cumberland Line services and intercity Blue Mountains Line, Central West Express and Outback Xplorer services.

It is located near Parramatta Square.

== History ==
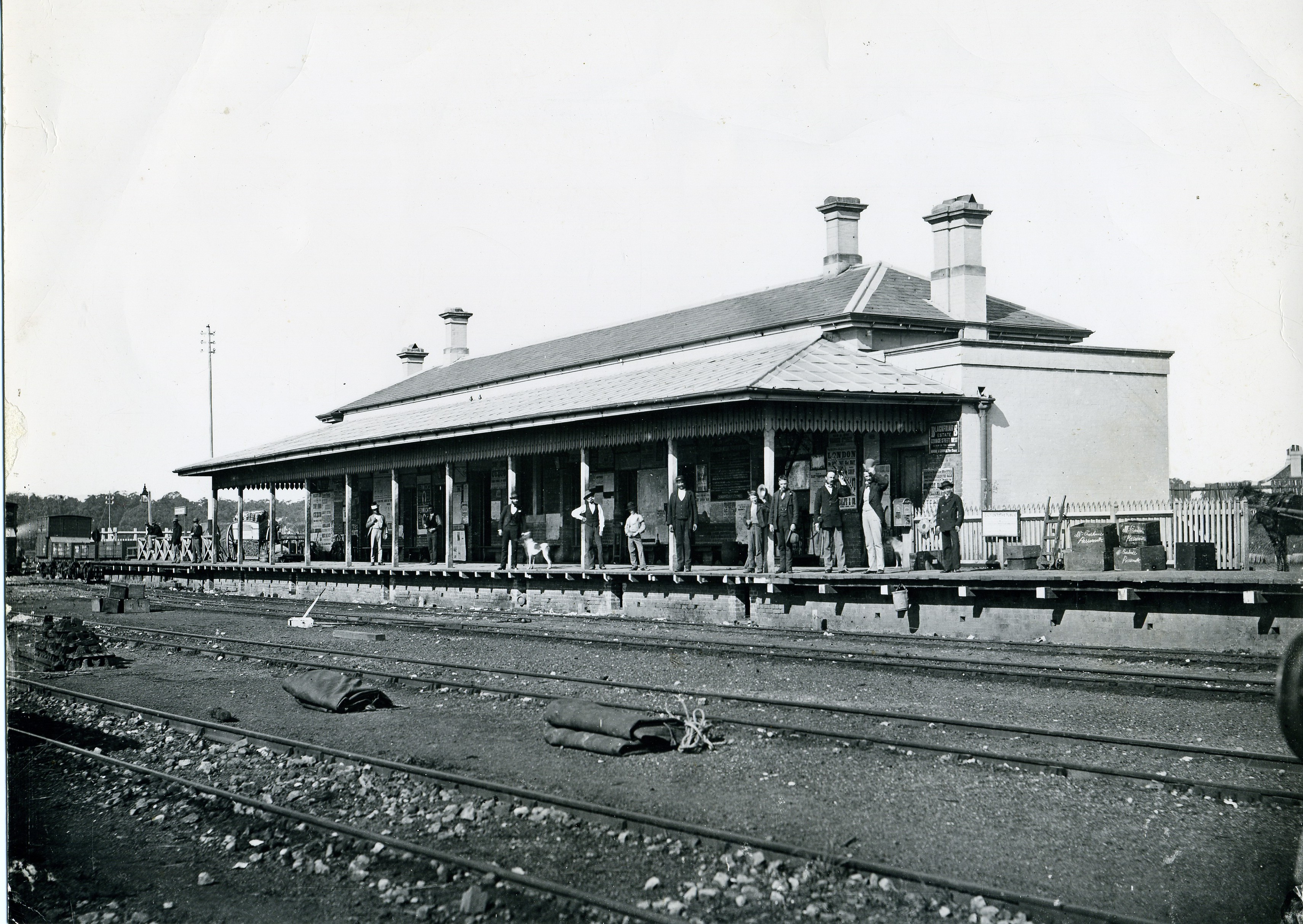
The station in 1870

Parramatta station is one of Sydney's oldest. Sydney's first line connected Sydney and Parramatta Junction near Granville and opened on 26 September 1855. It was extended to the current Parramatta station on 4 July 1860.

Prior to the Main Western line being quadrupled from Granville to Westmead in 1985, the station consisted of four platforms, platforms 3 and 4 on the main line and 1 and 2 on a loop.

In 1985, the station was refurbished with a new underground subway bus interchange built at the station's north-east side.

In late 2003, work began on a new transport interchange which linked the station to the neighbouring Westfield Parramatta shopping centre. The works included extending the platforms on the western end and providing a new taller shelter with lifts and tactile indicators along the platform, providing more access to commuters, and constructing a new bus interchange. On 19 February 2006 the interchange was opened.

In October 2016, the Parramatta Turnback Project was completed, adding crossovers to allow trains to terminate on platforms 3–4 in either direction.

The Darcy Street entrance to the station was closed from 1 September 2018 to late 2019 while improvements were being made to the station.

Parramatta metro station will be located around a block to the north of the current station and is planned to open in 2032.

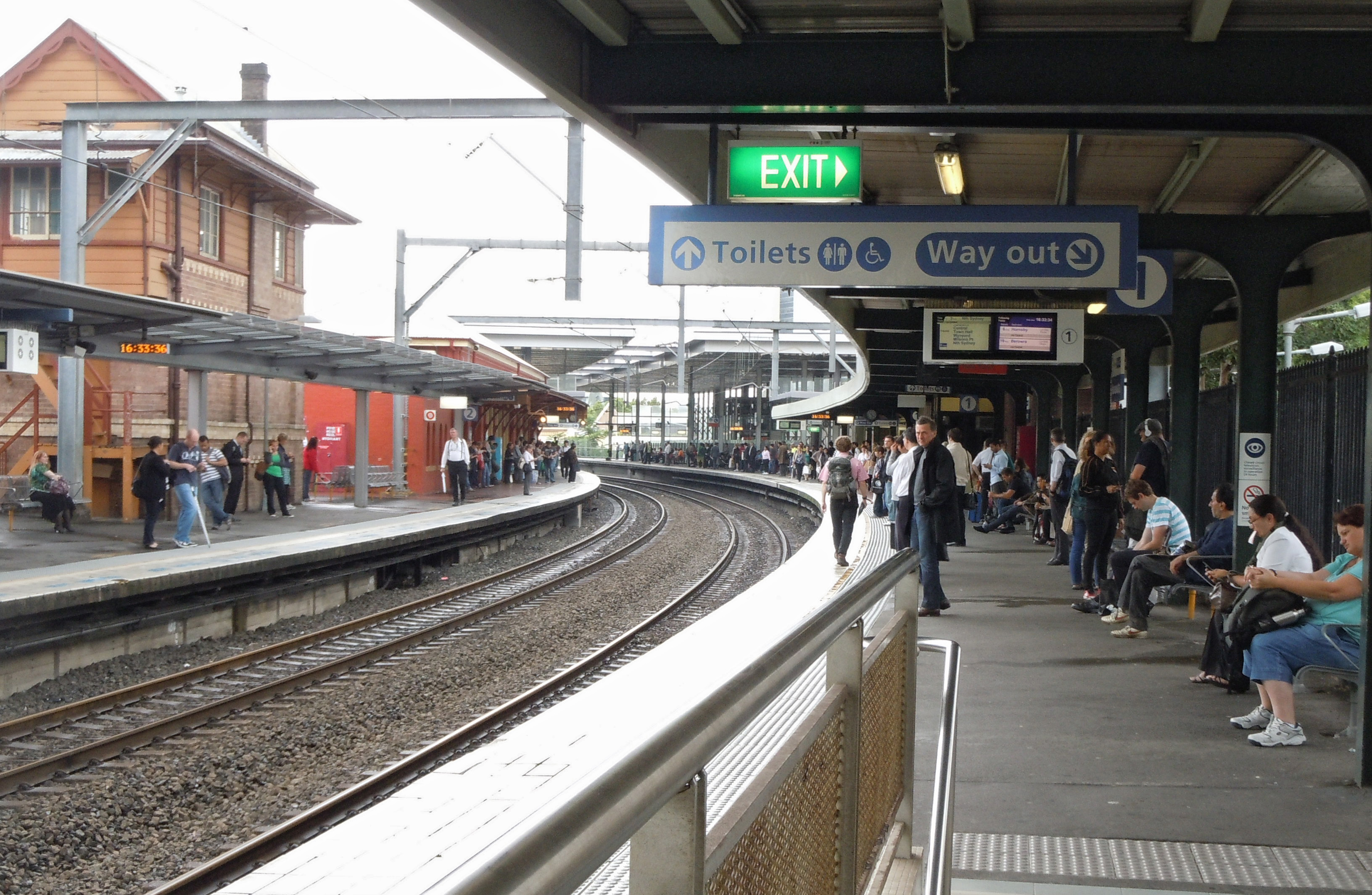
Platform 1, with the original station buildings

== Platforms and services ==
Platform	Line	Stopping pattern	Notes
1	North Shore & Western Line	Services to North Sydney, Hornsby and Berowra via Central	
1	North Shore & Western Line	Express services to Central via Strathfield	6 afternoon peak services
1	Blue Mountains Line	Services to Sydney Central	Most weekday services depart from here.
1	Western Region	Services to Sydney Central	Set down only
2	North Shore & Western Line	Services to Blacktown, Schofields, Richmond, Penrith and Emu Plains	Most weekday services depart from here.
2	North Shore & Western Line	Express services to Blacktown	6 morning peak services
2	Blue Mountains Line	Services to Springwood, Katoomba, Mount Victoria and Lithgow; 2 Evening peak hour services to Bathurst (Pick up only)	
2	Western Region	Services to Dubbo and Broken Hill	Pick up only
3	Leppington & Inner West Line	Weekday terminating services, returning as services to the City Circle	Only operates in the middle of the day.
3	Cumberland Line	Services to Blacktown, Leppington, Liverpool, Schofields and Richmond	T5 Trains leave from here on weekdays in both directions as Platform 4 is mainly used to terminate T2 line trains
3	North Shore & Western Line	Services to North Sydney, Lindfield, Hornsby and Berowra via Gordon	Mainly on weekends. Some Richmond services depart from here on weekday evenings.
4	Leppington & Inner West Line	Weekday terminating services, returning as services to the City Circle	
4	Cumberland Line	Services to Schofields and Richmond	T5 Trains mainly leave from here on weekends and during late nights on weekdays
4	North Shore & Western Line	Services to Blacktown, Schofields, Richmond, Penrith and Emu Plains	Richmond services depart from here only on weekdays off-peak and weekends. Penrith services depart from here only early in the morning, late at night or on weekends.

== Transport links ==
Indicator boards in 2011

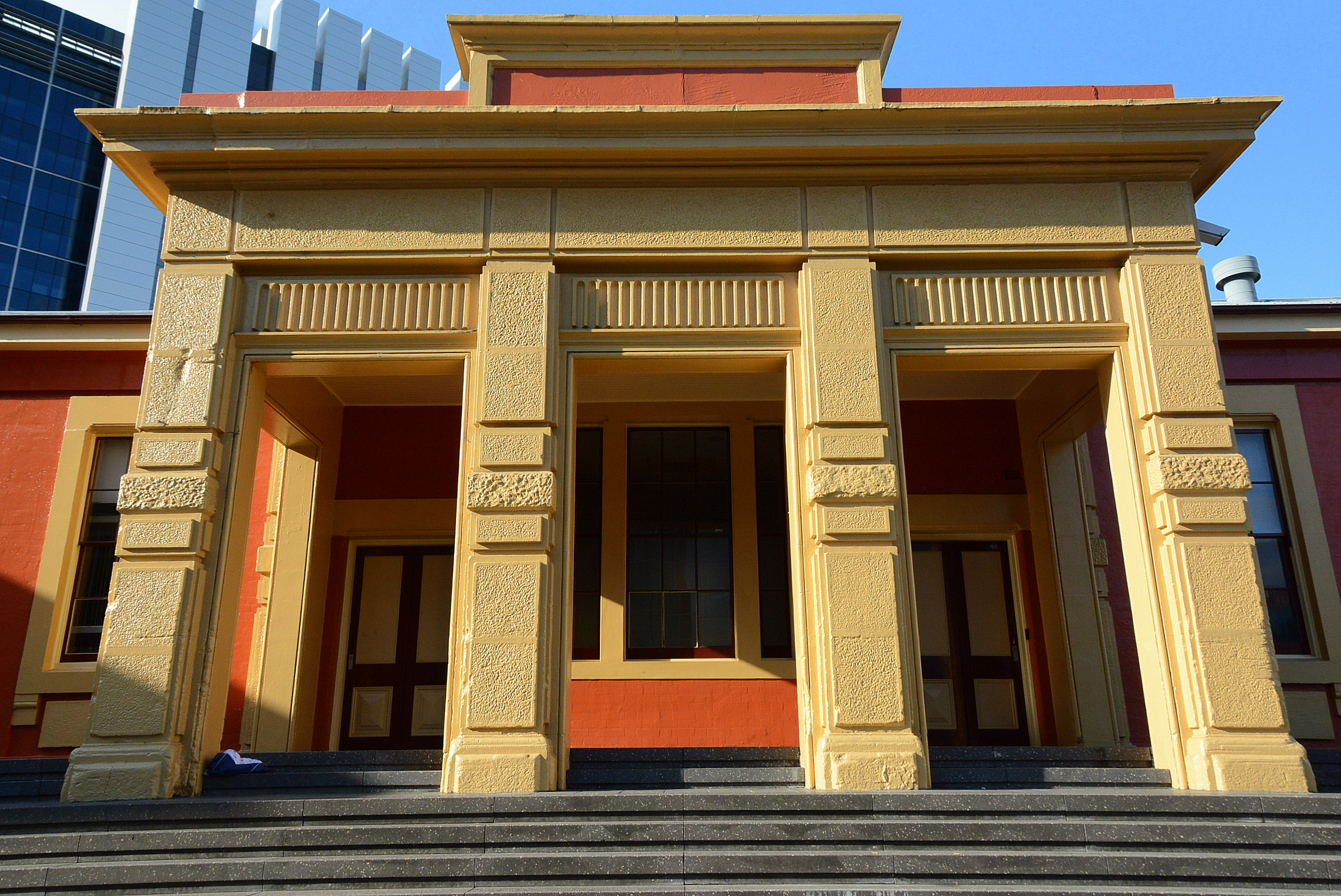
Southern entrance

Parramatta station connects with the Parramatta Square light rail station on the L4 Westmead & Carlingford Line.

Parramatta station has a large bus interchange located on the west side of the station between platform 4 and Westfield Parramatta. It serves a large number of routes operated by Busways, CDC NSW, Transit Systems and U-Go Mobility.

Stand A1

- Arrivals only

Stand A2

- 546: To Epping via Oatlands and North Rocks
- 549: To Epping via North Rocks
- 550: To Macquarie Park via Carlingford and Epping
- 609: To North Parramatta
- 625: To Pennant Hills
- 920: To Bankstown via Lidcombe
- NightRide route N60: Fairfield to Town Hall station
- NightRide route N70: Penrith to Town Hall station
- NightRide route N71: Richmond to Town Hall station
- NightRide route N81: To Town Hall station via Sydney Olympic Park

Stand A3

- 52: To Hyde Park via Ryde
- 521: To Eastwood
- 523: To West Ryde
- 524: To Ryde via West Ryde
- 525: To Lidcombe via Newington
- 545: To Macquarie Park via Telopea and Eastwood

Stand A4

- 600: To Pennant Hills
- 601: To Rouse Hill Station via Hills Showground
- 603: To Rouse Hill Station via Glenhaven
- 604: To Dural via Castle Hill
- 606: To Winston Hills
- 706: To Blacktown via Kings Langley and Winston Hills

Stand B1

- 906: To Fairfield via Guildford
- 907: To Bankstown via Bass Hill
- 909: To Bankstown via Auburn and Birrong
- 910: To Bankstown via Chester Hill

Stand B2

- 802: To Liverpool via Green Valley
- 804: To Liverpool via Hinchinbrook
- 806: To Liverpool via Abbotsbury
- 810: To Merrylands via Pemulwuy
- 811: To Pemulwuy via Bathurst Street, Greystanes
- 824: To Westmead Hospital via Hilltop Road
- NightRide route N60: Town Hall station to Fairfield
- NightRide route N70: Town Hall station to Penrith
- NightRide route N71: Town Hall station to Richmond
- T-Way route 80: To Liverpool via T-Way

Stand B3

- Arrivals only

Stand B4

- 660: To Castle Hill via Winston Hills and Norwest
- 661: To Blacktown station via North-West T-Way and Kings Langley
- 662: To Castle Hill via North-West T-Way and Bella Vista
- 663: To Rouse Hill Station via Glenwood
- 664: To Rouse Hill Station via Norwest
- 665: To Rouse Hill Station via North-West T-way direct
- 700: To Blacktown via Wentworthville
- 705: To Blacktown via Seven Hills
- 708: To Constitution Hill via Pendle Hill
- 711: To Blacktown via Constitution Hill

== Trackplan ==
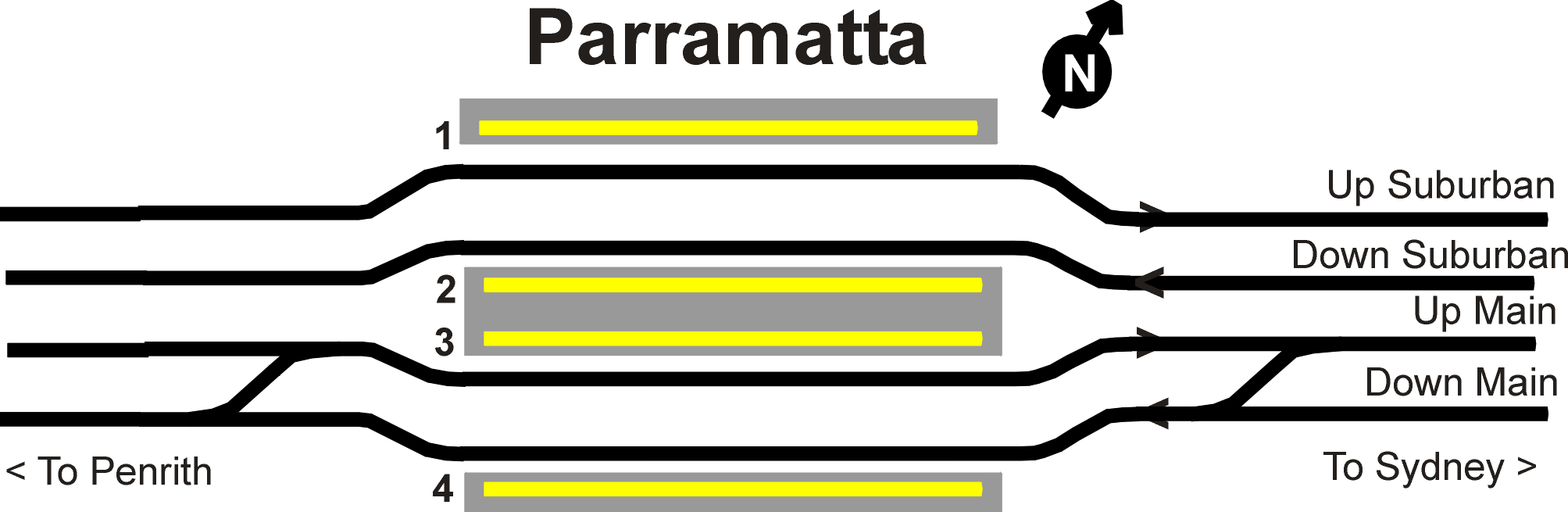
Track layout

As part of the Parramatta Turnback project, an additional crossover from the Up Main to the Down Main was constructed (not shown) west of the station.
