= Fairfield railway station, Sydney =

Railway station in Sydney, New South Wales, Australia

Fairfield
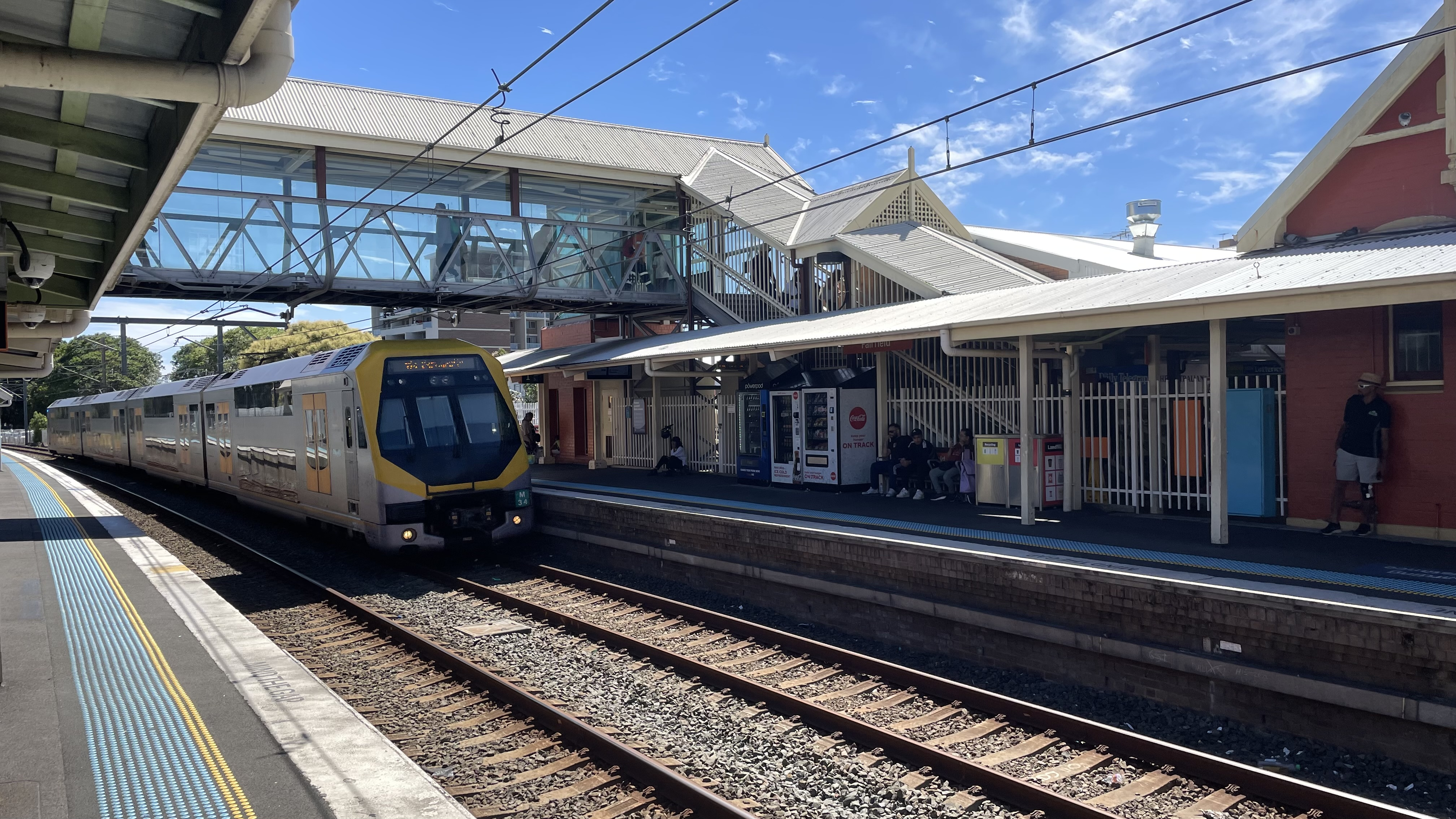
- Southbound view from Platform 2 in December 2024

General information
- Location: The Crescent, Fairfield; Sydney, New South Wales; Australia
- Coordinates: 33°52′21″S 150°57′25″E
- Elevation: 14 metres (46 ft)
- Owner: Transport Asset Manager of NSW
- Operator: Sydney Trains
- Line: Main Southern
- Distance: 29.00 km (18.02 mi) from Central
- Platforms: 2 (2 side)
- Tracks: 2
- Connections: Bus

Construction
- Structure type: Ground
- Accessible: Yes

Other information
- Status: Staffed
- Station code: FFL
- Website: Transport for NSW

History
- Opened: 26 September 1856 (169 years ago)
- Electrified: Yes (from 1930)

Passengers
- 2025: 3,010,281 (year); 8,412 (daily) (Sydney Trains)
- Rank: 56

Services
Preceding station	Sydney Trains	Following station
Canley Vale towards Leppington	Leppington & Inner West Line	Yennora towards City Circle
Canley Vale towards Leppington	Cumberland Line	Yennora towards Richmond

New South Wales Heritage Register
- Official name: Fairfield Railway Station group
- Type: State heritage (complex / group)
- Designated: 2 April 1999
- Reference no.: 1143
- Type: Railway Platform / Station
- Category: Transport – Rail
- Builders: NSW Government Railways
Location

Fairfield railway station is a heritage-listed suburban railway station located on the Main Southern line, serving the Sydney suburb of Fairfield. It is served by Sydney Trains T2 Leppington & Inner West Line and T5 Cumberland Line services. It was designed and built by NSW Government Railways from 1856 to 1891. It is also known as Fairfield Railway Station group. The property was added to the New South Wales State Heritage Register on 2 April 1999.

== History ==
After completion of the initial rail line from Sydney to Parramatta, work soon proceeded on the Main South line from Granville Junction to Goulburn. The first section from Granville to Liverpool was constructed quickly over easy terrain and was opened on 26 September 1856. Fairfield was opened with this section and was the only intermediate station at that time. Campbelltown was reached in 1858, that section opening on 17 May 1858. The line was duplicated in 1891. This line was constructed as a rural railway and had no suburban purpose until well into the twentieth century. Its stations served what were then rural settlements and only later were adapted as commuter stations. In 1924, the Main South line was diverted onto a more direct route via Regents Park. The existing line through Fairfield is also known as the Old Main South Line.

The present Down (east) platform is the original and the station master's residence built in 1856 (at the north end) is the oldest building still in existence in the NSW railways system and probably Australia. It was built a year after the railway opened to Parramatta. The second building built (1860) shows a change in attitude towards railway construction under John Whitton with an emphasis on passenger traffic and is one of a group of six buildings from that period with Branxton, Parramatta, St Mary's, Penrith and Picton. The third building represents a standard duplication building of the 1890s including a sympathetic extension in the 1930s, and again shows changes in railway use and design. The footbridge dating from 1918 ties the group together and is a good example of the style associated with a good group of buildings. In 1925, the Widemere Quarry Line was linked to the station with the Main Southern Line, before closing in 1945.

The station was upgraded and given lifts in 2003.

== Services ==
=== Platforms ===
Platform	Line	Stopping pattern	Notes
1	T2	services to Central & the City Circle	
1	T5	services to Blacktown, Schofields and Richmond	
2	T2	services to Leppington	
2	T5	services to Leppington weekend services to Liverpool	

=== Transport links ===
All buses depart from the Fairfield Interchange.

Transit Systems:

- 800: to Blacktown station Stand A
- 802: Parramatta station to Liverpool station – Stand C to Liverpool – Stand I to Parramatta
- 804: Parramatta station to Liverpool station – Stand C to Liverpool – Stand I to Parramatta
- 808: to Liverpool station Stand C
- 812: to Blacktown station Stand B
- 813: to Bonnyrigg Stand B
- 814: to Blacktown station Stand B
- 817: to Cabramatta station Stand A
- 904: to Liverpool station Stand E
- 905: to Bankstown station Stand D
- 906: to Parramatta station Stand E
- S4 to Chester Hill Stand D

Fairfield station is served by two NightRide routes:

- N50: Liverpool station to Town Hall station
- N60: to Town Hall station

== Trackplan ==
The points to the north of the station can be used to terminate southbound trains on platform 2 during trackwork or if there is an incident on the line. As this is a fairly rare occurrence, the signals around Fairfield are all automatic double colour light signals. Track circuits are used to determine the location of trains and automatically set signals appropriately. Both Sydenham and Granville signal boxes can monitor the status of trains in this area, but cannot control signals or points. If trains need to terminate, a local signal box on platform 1 can be used to control the points and signals.

== Description ==
The complex comprises a former type 1 Office/Station Master's Residence, located on Platform 2, erected in 1856; a type 4 platform building, located on Platform 1, erected c. 1891; and a type 3 platform building, located on Platform 2, erected c. 1860. Other structures include a footbridge, erected in 1918 and revised in c. 1990; platforms 1 and 2, completed c. 1856 and c. 1918 respectively; canopies, completed in 1990 and 1999; the Vine Street Footbridge, completed in 1965; and the jib crane, with an unknown completion date.

Context

Fairfield Railway Station is accessed from The Crescent to the north. The Bus Interchange stands in front of the station, between The Crescent and the station buildings. At some point before 1990, a covered shopping arcade was constructed immediately to the northwest of the station. The station can also be accessed from the south, via Dale Street. Car parking areas flank the station on both sides to the south. Across Dale Street is the Fairfield RSL complex.

Former office/Station Master's Residence – Platform 2 (1865)

External: Brick building, dating from 1856, originating as a square plan form with a gable roof. The roof has timber bargeboards and finials and the two original chimneys remain with corbel detailing to the top. The corrugated metal roofing material and guttering has been recently replaced. In the 1930s the building was extended in brick (along the platform to the west) to include two extra rooms and there is a further corrugated metal sheet clad extension to the west for a laundry. The detailing of the windows to these extensions is inappropriate in the context of the 1856 building. The concave veranda awning which flanks the building on the north and east elevations has recently been painted in a striped colour scheme (post 1980s). This awning is a timber-framed structure supported on the original timber posts and beams. There are original framing members as well; and some of the purlins are bowing in the centre. To the rear of the building, the veranda to the original building is enclosed by brick walls to either end. The awnings to the rear have shallow pitched roofs, and the entire extent of the western additions, and a section to the original building, have now been enclosed to become interior spaces. There is also an intrusive timber trellis across the open part of the veranda at the eastern end of the building. The open veranda has a timber deck. A covered area, which is fenced off to the platform, links this building and the platform building. The building remained in use as a residence until the 1970s.

Alterations to the 1856 building include: corrugated metal sheet clad extension to the west for a laundry; enclosing of the south-west veranda and improved sanitary facilities in 1941; a full height picket fence in front of the veranda posts to the platform elevation, enclosing of rear veranda to 1856 building; security doors and window bars installed; air-conditioning units fixed through original windows. The building has recently been repainted.

Platform building – Platform 1 (1891)

External: The original building took the form of a rectangular brick building, with a rendered plinth, with three rooms (booking office, general waiting room and ladies waiting room), with a relatively steep gable roof which features decorative timber bargeboards and finials and has small ventilation openings; this section of the building was linked to a further room (originally the men's toilet) to the western end which was orientated 90 degrees to the rest of the building, and maintains the same detailing, but has a raised ridge vent. The link (which housed the ladies toilets) also originally had a gable roof, but with a much lower ridge height, giving the sense of it being a deferential element. The original chimneys to the eastern section of the building still remain intact.

The windows are mostly the original timber framed sash windows with segmental arch heads with rendered detailing, and rendered and painted window sills resting on cement bracket mouldings. The extensions to the building follow the same detail, but with a simpler sill detail. Modifications such as Perspex secondary glazing and air-conditioning units and standard ticket windows have been installed within the original openings. One opening on the north elevation has been bricked up and there are some "blind" openings to the entrance way and to the western building on the north elevation. Some of the windows have been reglazed with wire mesh glass. The doors are mostly new, either solid or panelled, and there are security flyscreen doors fitted to the station master's office. A door way opening on the western elevation of the building (opposite the stair) has been bricked up. The building and all the awnings and canopies, have all been recently re-roofed with corrugated steel and new guttering. The building has been recently repainted.

The main part of the building, to the east, has a typical shallow pitched awning supported on cast iron columns, with Corinthian capitals and decorative cast iron brackets. The awning had a timber boarded valance to the east and west ends and a timber fascia to the platform edge. A new addition to accommodate a parcels office and signal room was constructed to the eastern end of the building. This addition had sensitive detailing and reused displaced elements of the original building such as the finial to the gable. This addition significantly altered the original roof structure. Documentary evidence shows that the parcels office addition also had a cantilevered awning over the platform, constructed in steel sections, which was replaced as a part of the 1990s works with a steel framed canopy supported on modern steel posts, the design of which is based on the 1890s original awning. This 1990s canopy structure extended around the entire platform building, except where the original awning remains and is described further on. The 1990s upgrade also saw major changes to the building form, by the removal of the link building, which was replaced with an open area with brick arched openings, with head details to match the original doors and windows. The other major alteration at this time was the large openings to the north and west elevation of the parcels office (to the Crescent) and the installation of new aluminium framed doors and windows, in order that the space could be used as a travel centre. More recently as part of the access upgrade an accessible toilet (from the platform) and new staff toilet was constructed in the south-east corner of the former parcels office.

Internal: The building has been modified internally over time to suit changing operational requirements; however a good degree of original fabric remains intact, particularly in what is now the booking office, which features pressed metal ceilings with ceiling roses and original cornices, and chimney breast with staff mould detailing. The doors and window architraves are mostly intact, and some of the windows with security bars to the inside. Standard ticket windows have been installed in the booking office. The former signal box room is now used as a CCTV monitoring room and is fitted out accordingly. To the eastern end there are new partition walls which are a remnant of the works to the former parcels office and new walls to the accessible toilet and new staff toilet. The parcels office and former travel centre are currently used for storage.

Platform building – Platform 2 (c. 1860)

External: A rectangular form brick building with a hipped roof form. The corrugated metal roofing material and guttering has been recently replaced. The original eaves fascia remains with new guttering and rainwater goods. The two original chimneys remain with corbel detailing to the top. The windows typically are double hung timber sashes with rendered lintels and sills. The doors are original timber panelled doors with bolection mouldings and have arched brick heads.

The original building consisted of 3 rooms with a small toilet annex, with a flat roof, to the south-west corner. At some stage (between 1916 and 1931 according to documentary evidence) the building was extended with a flat roof structure to the west. This space is currently used as the booking office. Also added to the south was a lean-to workshop, which is a timber-framed structure clad in weatherboards. The date of this extension is not known but this section of the building has detailing which is contemporary to construction dating from 1930 to 1950. The windows have security bars fitted to all the windows and doors along the southern elevation.

A new concourse building, constructed in brick with a hipped roof to match the existing roof profile, was built to the west of the original building c.1990; this structure provides a covered entrance to the station (and ticket window) from this side. This building has a mini-orb ceiling and a paved ground surface. The 1860s building has a timber framed awning to the platform elevation. The awning is supported by timber posts (recently replaced) with a shallow roof pitch, the soffit is the underside of the corrugated steel roofing which is supported on intermediate purlins. The building has recently been repainted.

Internal: The current booking office has a modern fitout, including standard ticket window installation. The buildings also includes a former ladies room (western end) and a kitchen fitout with new floor coverings, ceilings and cornices. There are original windows and doors with original architraves. There are toilet and washroom facilities in the annex to the south which have a modern fitout. There is a heater fixture installed with the modified fireplace opening.

The central room has original timber floors and plaster walls with staff mouldings on either side of the chimney breast. The ceiling has been replaced and there are no cornices. There are numerous services and conduits fixed to the walls. This room is used for storage. The former parcels & booking office (eastern end) has original timber floors and plaster walls with staff mouldings on either side of the chimney breast and new skirtings. The ceiling has been replaced. There are original windows and doors with original architraves. There is a new partition wall which contains electrical equipment. This room is used for storage. The lean to at the back has fibre cement sheeting to the walls and ceilings with timber floors and the original doors and windows intact. This room is also used for storage.

Footbridge (1918)

The original 1918 footbridge still remains. The footbridge is a riveted steel "Warren Truss" footbridge, which features angle iron trestles and channel iron stair stringers with compressed fibre cement decking. The footbridge was covered as part of a station upgrade c.1990. The surface of the footbridge was replaced recently with a tiled finish and the sides have been enclosed with frameless glass panels. The treads to the stairs have been replaced with precast concrete and a new tubular stainless steel handrail has been installed. The original iron risers are still visible.

The 2003 access upgrade included the installation of lift enclosures on both platforms which are located to the west of the footbridge and connected by a simple link.

Platforms

Platform 1 (Up) is a wayside platform and is concrete faced with an asphalt surface; Platform 2 (Down) is a wayside platform and is brick faced with an asphalt surface. The surface to both platforms was recently replaced as part of the 2003 access upgrade project. Tactile ground surface indicators run along the edge of the platforms and at the foot of the ramps and stairs.

Canopies

Platform 1: New canopy structures (c.1990) with transverse gable (with timber trellis detail) facing the platform. A steel skillion (1999) roofed canopy also covers the ramp access to the western end. A new canopy (c.1990) to the eastern end (in front of the Parcel Office extension) is constructed in steel to a detail loosely based on the existing awning to the heritage building.

Platform 2: New canopy structure (c.1990) abutting existing awning with timber framing supported on timber posts with transverse gable (with timber trellis detail) facing the platform. All the canopies are clad in corrugated steel. The canopy cover continues up and over the stair and footbridge, with similar gable detailing to landings and to the north and south elevation of the footbridge.

The Crescent Entrance: New canopy structure (c.1990) abutting existing awning with timber framing supported on timber posts with transverse gable (with timber trellis detail) facing the street. The canopy cover continues up and over the stairs and footbridge, and returns along the platform edge. All the canopies are clad in corrugated steel.

There is also a hipped roof shelter in front of the booking office and several canopies, to the same detail as above, over the waiting areas of the bus interchange.

Dale Street Entrance: New canopy structure supported on steel posts and timber roof framing and corrugated steel to the roof. The canopy has a gable detail to match 1990s structures. A steel skillion (1999) roofed canopy also covers the ramp access to the western end.

Vine Street Footbridge

Simple structure constructed from standard steel sections on concrete foundations with a precast concrete deck and steel balustrade. The footbridge appears to be unchanged based on original documentation.

Jib crane

Existing documentation shows a goods shed (no longer extant) located to the north of the station with a single track located adjacent to where the present crane is located. This is a standard 2 tonne iron jib crane built by the Morris Brothers in Sydney. The crane, which sits on a brick and tile base, is no longer used but remains as an ornamental element set within a garden bed.

Based on the surviving documentation and the evidence on site it is unlikely there would be any potential archaeological remains at Fairfield Railway Station.

=== Condition ===
The former office/Station Master's residence building on Platform 2, despite some inappropriate additions and modifications, is in good condition (based on external analysis), and as the oldest surviving station building in NSW, has a high level of integrity. The 1880s platform building is relatively intact and despite additions and refurbishment, as well as operational changes, is representative of its historic form and has a high level of integrity. The 1860s platform building is very intact and despite additions and refurbishment, as well as operational changes, is representative of its historic form and has a high level of integrity. The introduction of the canopies over the stairs and the footbridge, and the construction of the lift enclosures have decreased the integrity of the 1918 structure. The condition of the fabric and the addition of these contemporary structures mean that the stairs and footbridge have reduced integrity. The platforms have been extended since they were originally constructed, and the surface has been replaced. The Vine Street footbridge is in its original condition and despite its being a later structure, as it is intact maintains a moderate level of integrity. The jib crane is not in use, but the fabric is in good condition. The crane has a high level of integrity despite losing some of its context with the removal of the goods yard.

=== Modifications and dates ===
- 1878 – New booking office, ladies waiting room and parcels office opened
- 1879 – Platform lengthened
- 1891 – Line duplicated and additional platform with building built
- 1918 – Pedestrian footbridge erected
- 1919 – Platforms lengthened
- 1929 – Railway electrified
- c. 1944 – Parcels office extension to Platform 1 Building
- 1965 – Vine Street footbridge erected
- 1990 – Canopies constructed (extended in 1999) stairs and footbridge covered; Major alterations to platform buildings
- 2003 – Access upgrade works, including lift enclosures on both platforms

== Heritage listing ==
As at 25 October 2010, Fairfield Railway Station has State significance as one of the earliest railway stations established during the first phase of NSW railway construction in the 1850s. Opened in 1856 the station was one of only two stations at the time of line construction, the other being Liverpool, on the section of the Main South Line constructed between Granville and Liverpool. It is also historically significant as the existing 1850s former station master's residence is the oldest surviving railway building in NSW and possibly Australia. The building is also rare within the Sydney Metropolitan area being one of only three known examples and, along with the 1860s and 1890s platform building, it is able to demonstrate the development of the railways from its early phase of operations through to the 1890s duplications of the lines. The various changes to the station demonstrate its evolution from a rural railway station to a suburban service and reflect the growth and change of the local area. The 1918 footbridge is a common type of structure found at suburban railway stations and together with the platform buildings and former station master's residence it forms a recognisable landmark in the local area.

Fairfield railway station was listed on the New South Wales State Heritage Register on 2 April 1999 having satisfied the following criteria.

The place is important in demonstrating the course, or pattern, of cultural or natural history in New South Wales.

Fairfield Railway Station is historically significant at the state level as one of the earliest railway stations established during the first phase of NSW railway construction in the 1850s. Opened in 1856 the station was one of only two stations, the other being Liverpool, on the section of the Main South Line constructed between Granville and Liverpool.

The station is also historically significant at the state level as the existing 1850s former station master's residence is the oldest surviving station building in NSW and possibly Australia and along with the 1860s "Second Class Station Building" and the 1890s "Third Class Station Building" it is able to demonstrate the development of the railways from its early phase of operations through the 1890s duplications of the lines. The various changes to the station demonstrate its evolution from a rural railway station to a suburban service and reflect the growth and change of the local area.

The place is important in demonstrating aesthetic characteristics and/or a high degree of creative or technical achievement in New South Wales.

Fairfield Railway Station Group has State significance with its 1850s combined residence/office building which along with sympathetic additions to its west retains characteristic features of this type of station building namely gabled roof, the two rooms width of the original residence section of the building and veranda awnings supported by timber posts. The '1860s "Second Class Station Building" despite extensions to its south and west retains typical features, namely the original symmetrical section of the building and its hipped roof with chimneys. Similarly the 1890s "Third Class Station Building" despite additions and alterations has most of its architectural features and details intact including the varied roof forms, the awning supported on original cast iron posts with Corinthian capitals and decorative cast iron brackets. The footbridge with stairs leading down the platforms, has been recently covered and its surfaces recently tiled. However its superstructure, consisting of a riveted steel "Warren Truss" with angle iron trestles and channel iron stair stringers and compressed fibre cement decking, is original 1910s fabric and is typical of such footbridges within the suburban network. The station with its platform buildings, station building and footbridge collectively forms a recognisable landmark in the local area.

The place has a strong or special association with a particular community or cultural group in New South Wales for social, cultural or spiritual reasons.

The place has the potential to contribute to the local community's sense of place and can provide a connection to the local community's history.

The place possesses uncommon, rare or endangered aspects of the cultural or natural history of New South Wales.

The combined residence/office building is a relatively rare railway structure, with only three extant examples in the metropolitan network, the other two being at Riverstone and Emu Plains.

The place is important in demonstrating the principal characteristics of a class of cultural or natural places/environments in New South Wales.

The Second Class platform building at Fairfield Railway Station has been altered considerably in terms of extensions to its south and west and new fitouts to its interiors but as it retains considerable amount of original fabric internally and externally and it has characteristic features of its this type of building and is a representative example. The "Third Class" platform building at Fairfield Railway Station, despite alterations and the additions has remained largely intact externally and is therefore representative of this class of railway buildings. Although the footbridge has been altered it retains the characteristic superstructure of footbridges and is representative of standard footbridge design.
