= Guildford railway station, Victoria =

Former railway station in Victoria, Australia

Guildford

General information
- Location: Victoria, Australia
- Elevation: 251 m (823 ft)
- System: Former railway station
- Owner: VicTrack
- Line: Moolort railway line

Other information
- Status: Demolished

History
- Opened: 7 July 1874

Guildford Railway Station served the town of Guildford, Victoria for a little over a hundred years. The station once followed a railway S-curve, which was unique among Victorian Railways stations.

The station was demolished when passenger services ceased, but remains of the former goods platform are still visible. The former station master's residence is still standing by the main road.
