= Leppington railway station =

Railway station in Sydney, New South Wales, Australia

Leppington
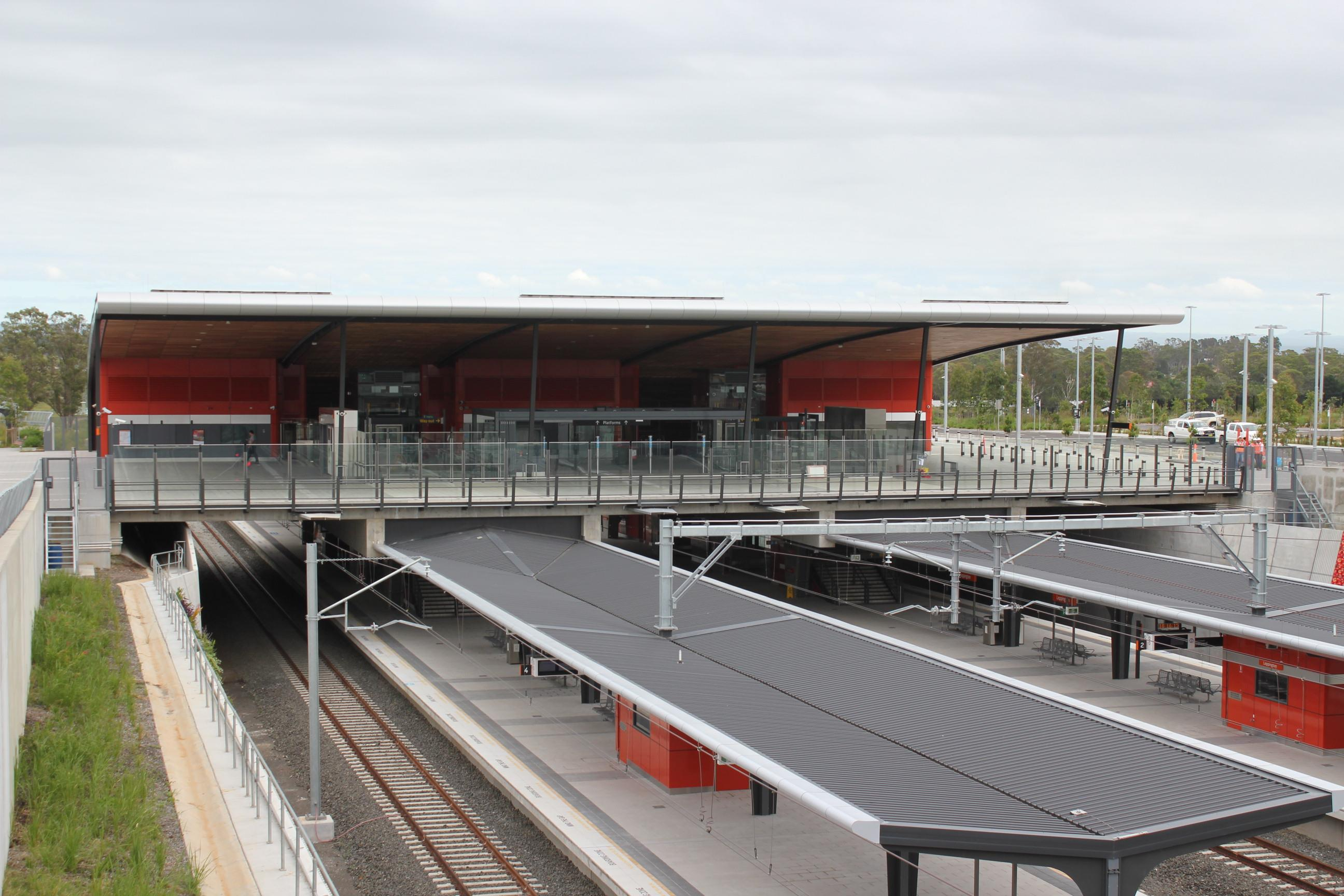
- Westbound view of station platforms and footbridge, February 2015

General information
- Location: Leppington; Sydney, New South Wales; Australia
- Coordinates: 33°57′16″S 150°48′29″E
- Owner: Transport Asset Manager of New South Wales
- Operator: Sydney Trains
- Line: South West Rail Link
- Distance: 51.1 kilometres (31.8 mi) from Central
- Platforms: 4 (2 island)
- Tracks: 4
- Connections: Bus

Construction
- Structure type: Ground
- Accessible: Yes

Other information
- Status: Staffed
- Website: Transport for NSW

History
- Opened: 8 February 2015

Passengers
- 2025: 2,238,620 (year); 6,133 (daily) (Sydney Trains)
- Rank: 72

Services
Preceding station	Sydney Trains	Following station
Terminus	T2 Leppington & Inner West Line	Edmondson Park towards City Circle
Terminus	T5 Cumberland Line	Edmondson Park towards Richmond
Location

Leppington railway station is the terminus of the South West Rail Link which serves the south-western Sydney suburb of Leppington. It opened on 8 February 2015. A ten road stabling facility is located to the west of the station at Rossmore. It is serviced by Sydney Trains' T2 Leppington & Inner West Line and T5 Cumberland Line services.

== Platforms and services ==
Leppington has two island platforms with four faces. Initial services consisted of a half-hourly shuttle to Liverpool. From 13 December 2015, trains operate directly to the city via Granville. Despite all four platforms capable of serving any line, platform 2 and 3 are normally used to serve the T2 and T5, while platforms 1 and 4 remain mostly unused. From 26 November 2017, Cumberland Line services stop at the station, providing a link to Parramatta, Blacktown, Schofields and Richmond.

Platform	Line	Stopping pattern	Notes
1 to 4	T2 Leppington & Inner West Line	terminating services to & from Central & the City Circle via Liverpool and Granville	
1 to 4	T5 Cumberland Line	terminating services to & from Blacktown, Schofields and Richmond	

== Transport links ==
Transit Systems NSW operates six bus routes via Leppington station, under contract to Transport for NSW:

- 840: to Campbelltown Hospital via Oran Park
- 841: to Narellan
- 855: Liverpool Station to Rutleigh Park
- 856: Liverpool Station to Bringelly
- 860: Liverpool Station to Western Sydney Airport
- 861: Denham Court to Carnes Hill via Austral

Leppington station is served by one NightRide route.

- N31: to Liverpool

== Gallery ==
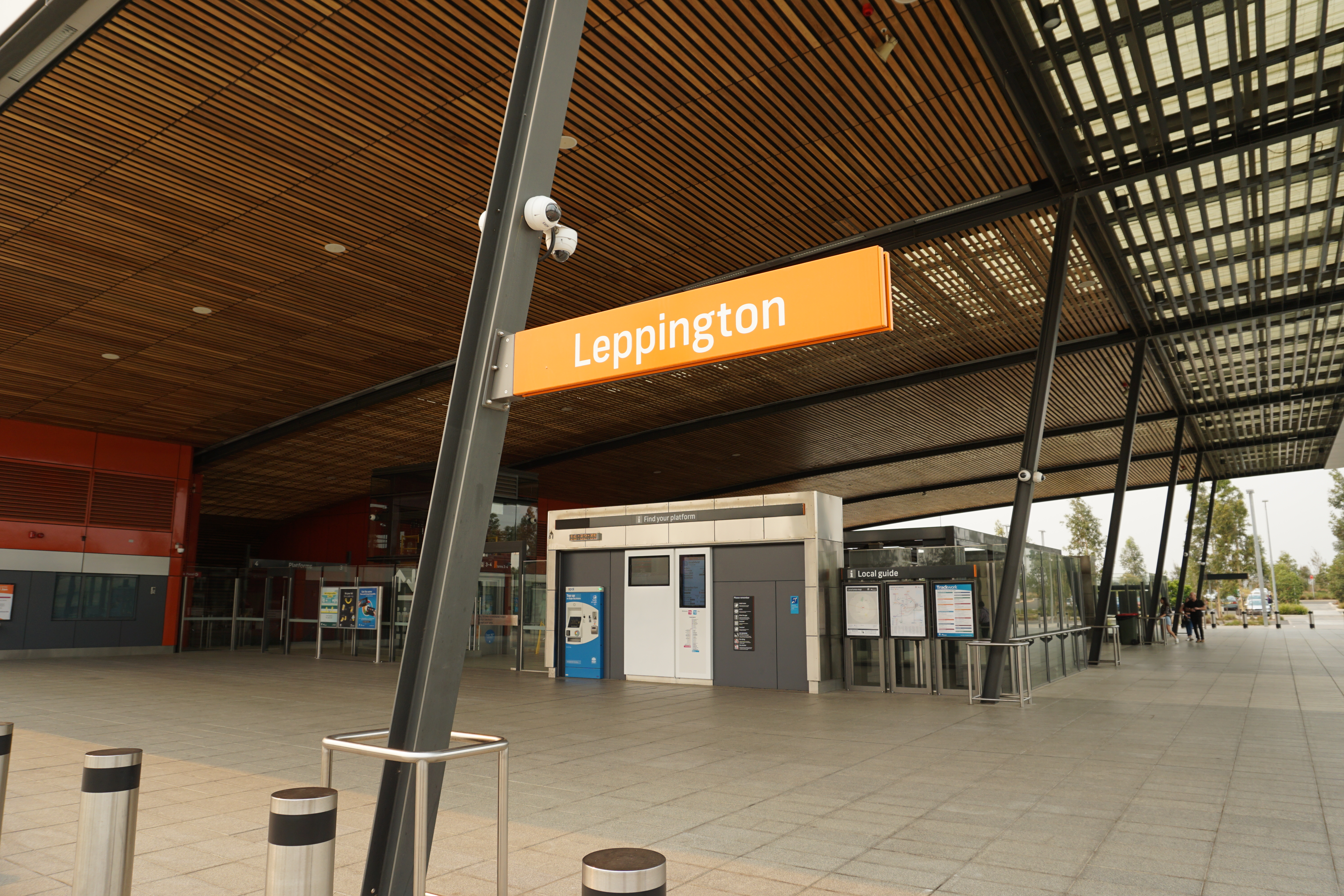
Station entrance

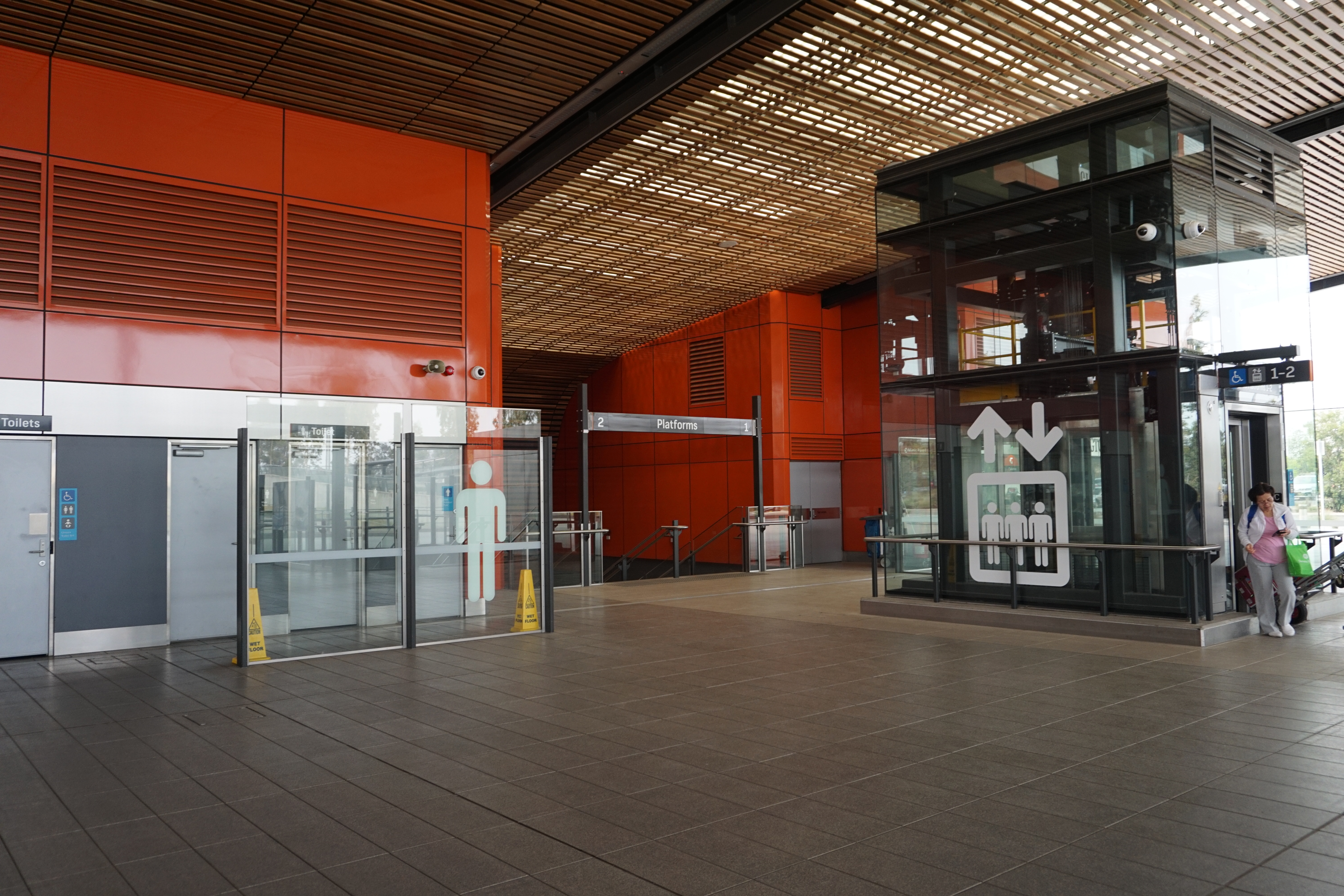
Concourse

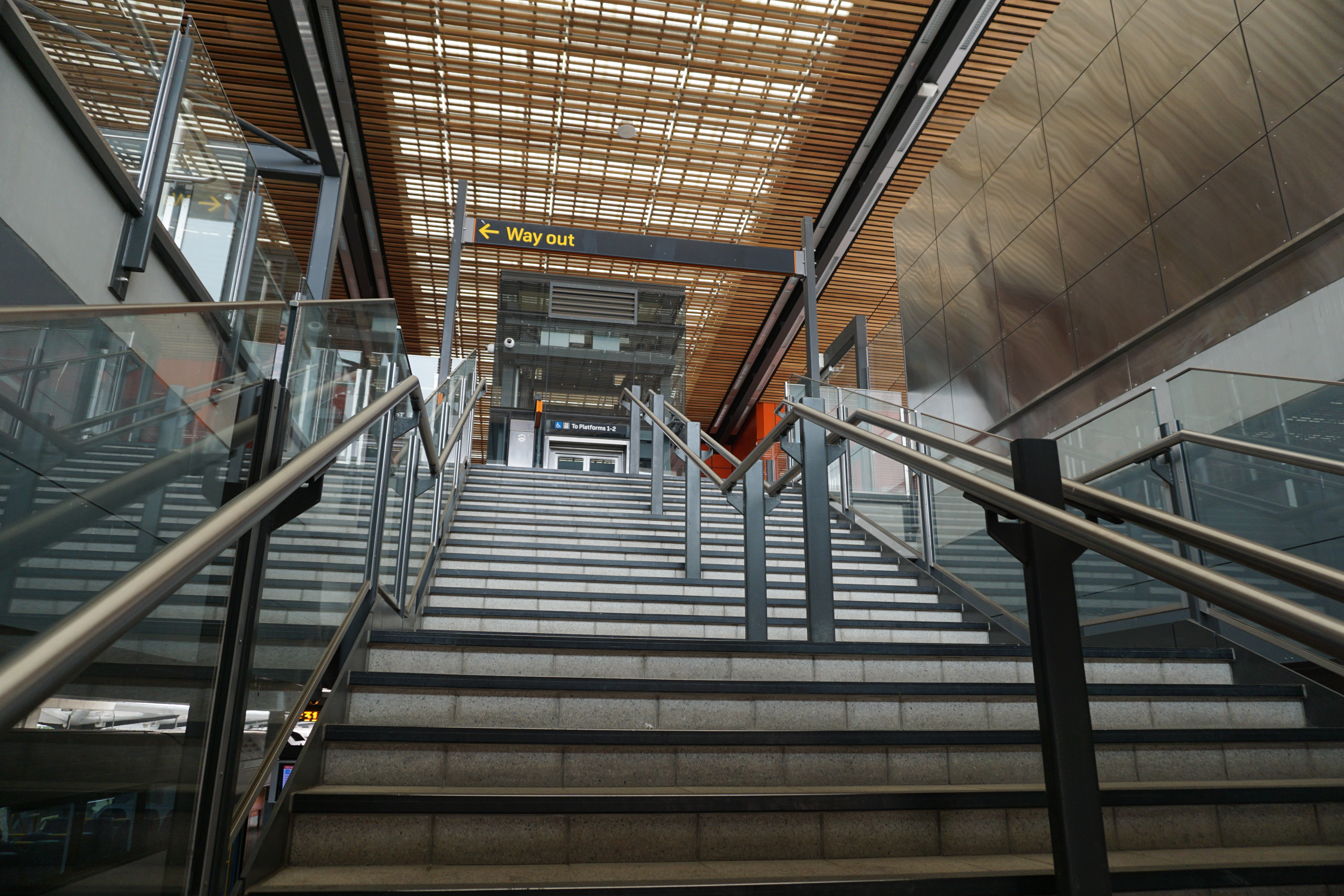
Stairway from platform to concourse

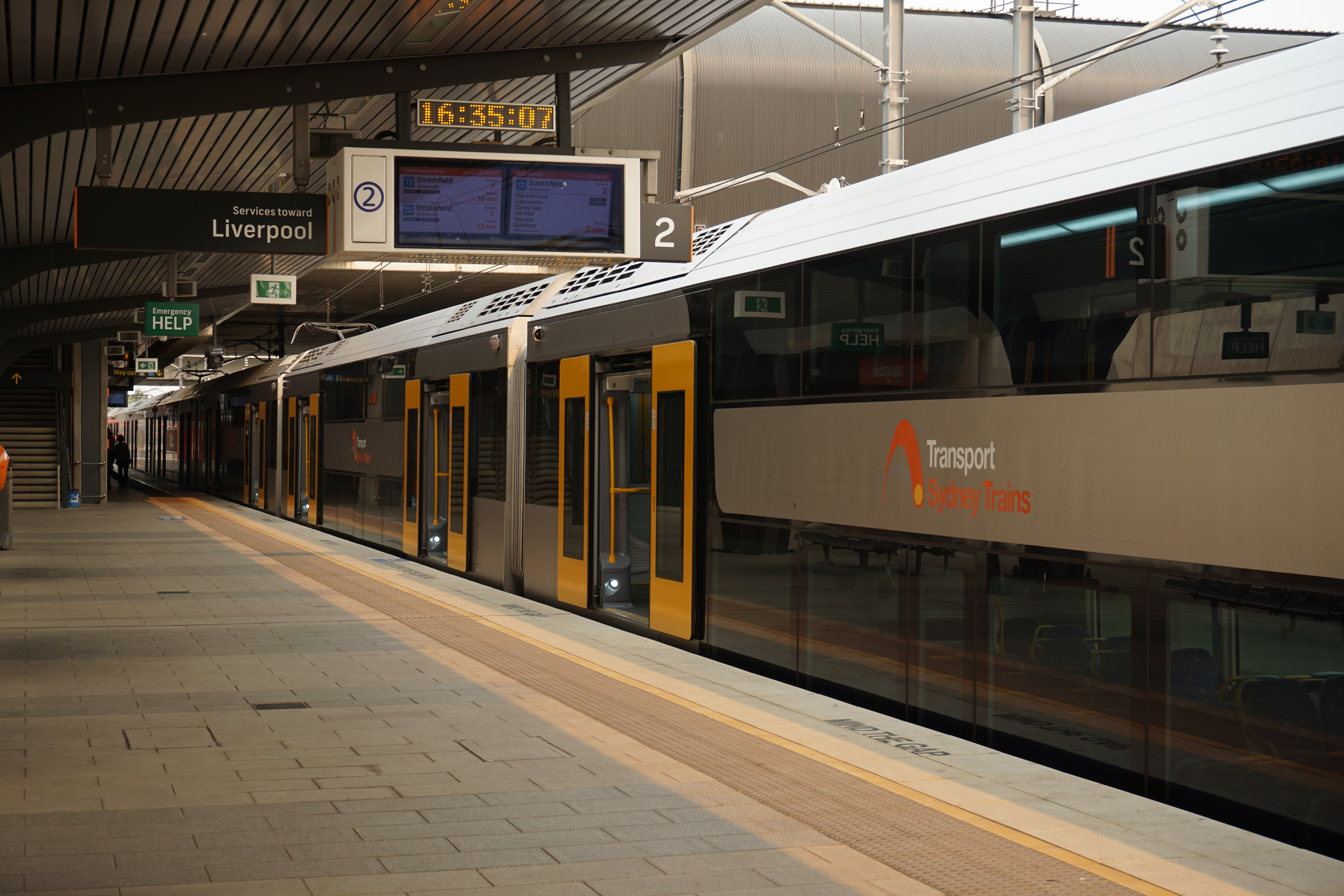
A Waratah train at platform 2
