= The Hermitage, Denistone =

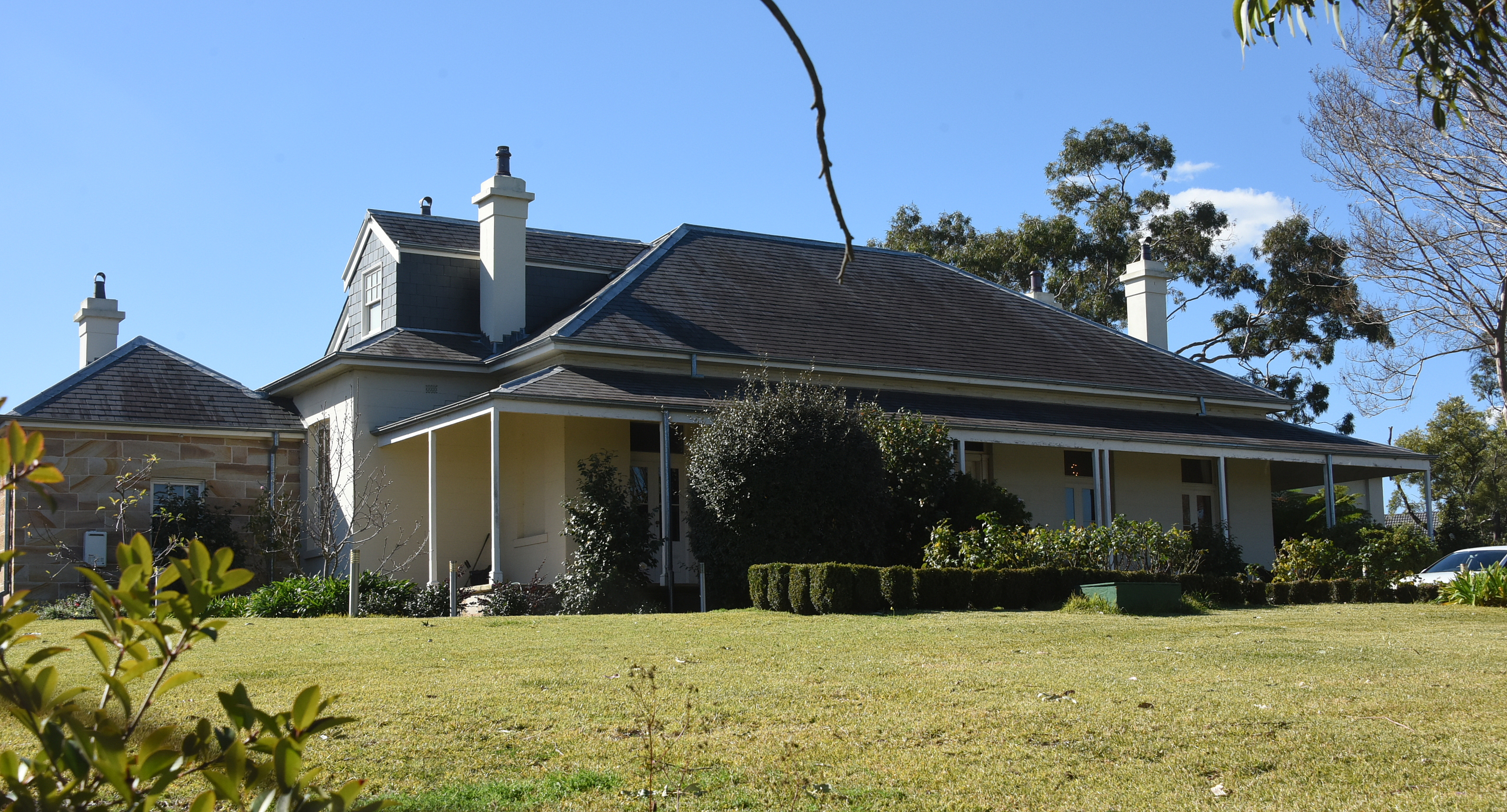
- The Hermitage, in Denistone

- Location within Sydney
- 33°48′06″S 151°05′57″E
- Location: 1–13 Pennant Avenue, Denistone, City of Ryde, New South Wales, Australia

History
- Built: 1838–1842

Site notes
- Architect: John Bibb (possibly)

New South Wales Heritage Register
- Official name: Hermitage and Garden; The Hermitage and Garden
- Type: State heritage (complex / group)
- Designated: 2 April 1999
- Reference no.: 777
- Type: House
- Category: Residential buildings (private)

The Hermitage is a heritage-listed residence, former research institute and government office located at 1–13 Pennant Avenue, Denistone, New South Wales, a suburb of Sydney, Australia. It was possibly designed by architect John Bibb and built from 1838 to 1842 in the Australian colonial Victorian era style. It is also known as The Hermitage and Garden. The property is privately owned. It was added to the New South Wales State Heritage Register on 2 April 1999.

== History ==
=== Early colonial history ===
The Ryde area was highly suitable for farming and orchards, and early land grants to marines were given to encourage agriculture. In 1792 land in the area was granted to 8 marines; two of the grants were in the modern area of Ryde. Isaac Archer and John Colethread each received 80 acres of land on the site of the present Ryde-Parramatta Golf Links, now in West Ryde. Later in 1792, in the Eastern Farms area, 12 grants, most of them about 12 hectares (30 acres), were made to convicts.

Much later these farms were bought by John Macarthur, Gregory Blaxland and the Reverend Samuel Marsden. The district remained an important orchard area throughout the 19th century.

=== John and Ellen Blaxland ===
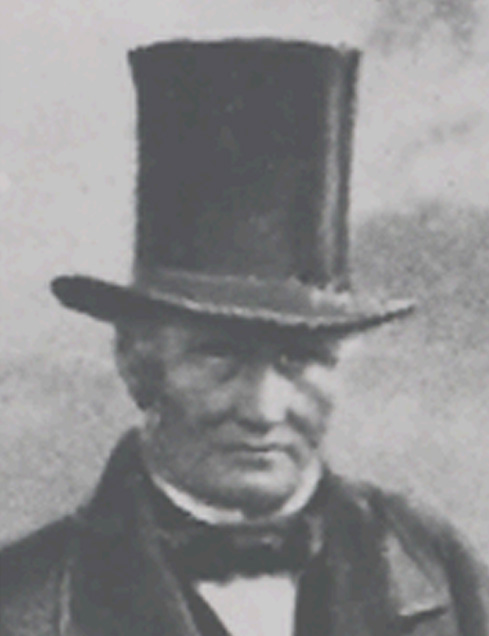
John Blaxland (1801–1884), c. 1860.

The Hermitage was built from c. 1838 to 1842 for John Blaxland, the eldest son of the Blue Mountains explorer Gregory Blaxland. It was made of stone and clay bricks made on site. The house is said to have been designed by the architect John Bibb but there is some conjecture over this. Curby (2003, 2) notes it was commissioned by Dibbs for Blaxland. Its land consisted of 49 hectares (120 acres) which Thomas Forster had amalgamated from four early farm grants in the 1830s and sold to John Blaxland in 1838.

John Blaxland held several important positions during his life. He was a merchant of independent means. For some years he was the Director of the Australian Joint Stock Bank and also the Auditor of the City Bank. In 1863 he became a Member of the New South Wales Legislative Council and held this position for over 20 years. He was a strong advocate for the erection of the Parramatta and Iron Cove bridges.

Some of John's children obtained prominent positions in the community. Frederick Blaxland qualified for the Bar in 1870 and became the senior partner in the legal firm Messrs Blaxland Mawson and Rose in Cooma. He was also for some years, the Mayor of Cooma. Herbert Blaxland became a doctor and was appointed Medical Superintendent of the Gladesville Hospital.

During their lives John and Ellen had a strong association with St Anne's Church, Ryde and today there still exists a Communion table in the Church with the following inscription.

“To the glory of God and in memory of John Blaxland and Ellen his wife (née Falkner), of the Hermitage, Ryde.”

John died in 1884 and Ellen continued to live at the Hermitage for three more years. An advertisement appeared in The Sydney Morning Herald in 1887 for the sale of the furniture at the Hermitage by order of “Mrs Blaxland" . At that time her only daughter Lucy married Sydney Levick and Ellen went to live with her. She died in 1903 at the age of 85 at her daughter's house. An obituary appeared in The Sydney Morning Herald at the time of her death outlining some details of her life and noting that she was “an old and respected resident of Ryde where she lived for over 40 years". In 1905 The Hermitage was subdivided and put on the market. A large advertisement was put in the newspaper giving a colourful description of the property. Professor James Pollock bought the house in 1910.

John Blaxland and his wife Ellen had panoramic views down to the Parramatta River and beyond when they stood on their front verandah. Nine children were born to them and raised there. The house originally consisted of a main block with 12 rooms and encircling verandahs. It had attic rooms and a western rear kitchen wing. The east wing of bedrooms was added in about 1860, connected to the main block by a curved screen wall. At an unknown time a stable wing was built as part of the Home Farm which included stock yards, an orchard and a vineyard. Like many of the mansions built in the Ryde district in the 19th century, the Hermitage was essentially a country house surrounded by a spacious estate. Around 1875 extensive farm improvements were made including a vineyard with a gardener's cottage and wine house (north of the homestead and yards and north of what today is Blaxland Road), an orchard (north-west of the house and yards), a dovecote, animal pens, paddocks and stockyards (north of the homestead).

==== 1885–1894 – House leased or unoccupied ====
Around 1884 several large estates in the district including the Hermitage were subdivided. After the death of John Blaxland in 1884, Ellen took up residence with her daughter Lucy at "Minimbah", Longueville. The Hermitage lay virtually unoccupied until 1905 except for a few years when it was let out to a series of tenants.

A drawing of the site entitled "Plan of the Hermitage as it was long ago" showing its original layout and garden setting was drawn by L. M. Levick in 1912, the husband of Blaxland's daughter, Lucy. Levick's drawing shows the layout c.1870, which included subsequent additions to the property made by the Blaxland family (1842–84), including the two additional bedrooms built to the east wing and the west stables wing...Two orchard buildings also existed and the house originally had a driveway connecting to Blaxland Road. On the opposite side of this road were an orchard and a vineyard with gardener's cottage. Other associated outbuildings are clearly marked on the plan including animal pens and stockyards likely to have been installed c. 1875 when improvements to the farm commenced.

At Ellen Blaxland's death in 1903 the land around The Hermitage was subdivided and sold in several auctions held in the period 1905–1919. The Hermitage and all the estate south of Blaxland Road was subdivided and sold at auction in 1905.

==== Subdivision of the estate (1905–1964) ====
Thomas Gosper, an "illuminating artist", purchased the adjoining subdivided one and a quarter acre block in 1907 and built a single storey Edwardian style house called Wandilly in about 1908. This is the house now known as Wollondilly.

=== Professor James Pollock ===
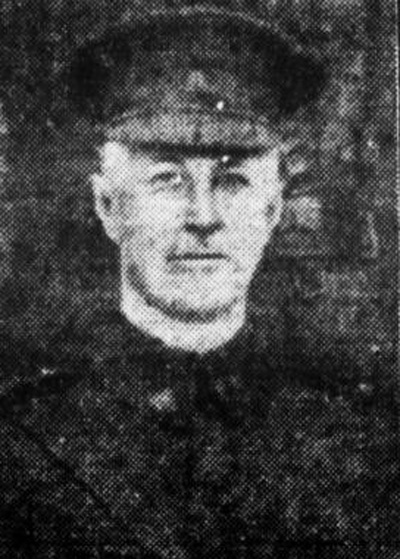
Professor James Arthur Pollock in his military uniform when he enlisted to fight in World War 1 in 1916 at the age of 51.

James Arthur Pollock was born in 1865 in county Cork in Ireland. His father was James Wheeler Pollock who was a damask manufacturer and his mother was Emma Brierley. He had one brother and one sister whose names were Hugh and Annie. He obtained a Bachelor of Engineering Degree from the Royal University of Ireland in 1884. However, in 1885, because of a decline in the family business, he migrated to Sydney and his family followed later.

He obtained a job in as an astronomical assistant and in 1889 gained a Bachelor of Science Degree from the University of Sydney and won the University Medal. He was employed by the university in the Physics area and ten years later became a professor at the age of 34. He never married. The house had many alterations during this time.

In 1910 he bought The Hermitage and lived there with his unmarried sister Annie until his death in 1922. In 1916, at the age of 51, James enlisted to fight in World War 1. He served in France in the Mining Corps and trained tunnellers to use equipment that he had helped to design. After the war he returned to his work at the university.

Shortly after his return he advertised the sale of The Hermitage stating that the house was too large for him. The description of the property was:

“Situated on the heights and commanding glorious panoramic views taking in Parramatta River and other features right on to the Western Mountains. The bungalow residence stands in its own grounds of two and three quarter acres, the latter laid out in lawn, garden and orchard. The residence is most substantially built of brick on stone foundations, slate roof. Contains 3 reception rooms, 7 bedrooms, 3 bathrooms, kitchen and laundry. All modern conveniences, 250 feet verandahs. Detached garage, man’s room and fowl houses.”

James died in 1922. Annie was his sole beneficiary, and after The Hermitage was sold she moved to another house in Sydney. She died thirty years later in 1952 and left her estate of about 40 thousand pounds to the University of Sydney to promote research in Physics and for the memory of her brother James.

A drawing by Mrs Z. M. Levick dated 19 July 1912 showed the homestead facing the drive to the "white gate" to its east, a paddock to its south-westl fruit trees, a vineyard, strawberry patches and an orchard to the homestead's west and north-west; a grass yard between the two wings of outbuildings rear and north of the homestead, animal pens (fowls, rabbits, pigsty, bail, stock yard) and paddock to its north, a tennis ground "made when Frank and I grew up" to its east, a bush house and round summer house to the east of the homestead's eastern wing of bedrooms, Blaxland Road to the north of the orchard and stock yard and beyond this bush to the north/northwest, a vineyard, oranges, wine house and gardener's cottage and water hole where the clay was sourced for the bricks to the north of Blaxland Road.

=== The Nicholson family (1923–52) ===
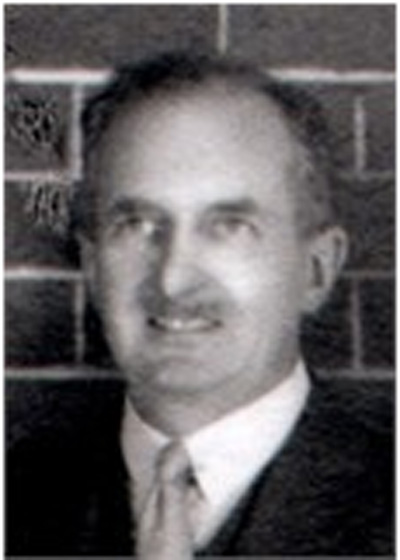
Theo Nicholson (1894–1955)

Theo Nicholson (David Theodore Field Nicholson) was born in 1894 in Waverley, Sydney. His father was James Beath Nicholson and his mother was Ethel Catherine Beath. His father James had migrated from Scotland in 1885 and had helped to established and later owned the Standard-Waygood Company which was a large engineering firm. Theo went to work in his father's engineering business and later took over the management of the company.

In 1920 Theo married Elinor Young (Winifred Elinor Broughton Young) who was born in 1896 in Bundaberg, Queensland. Her father was Horace Edward Broughton Young and her mother was Ellen Elizabeth Thorne. The Young family owned a property called Fairymead Sugar Plantation near Bundaberg. Elinor met Theo when her family came to Sydney for holidays to escape the heat. Both the Nicholson and Young families were very religious and were strongly involved in Christianity. During the 1930s the Nicholson family conducted a Sunday School at The Hermitage. This was a lively household with family, servants and frequent visitors, all interacting under the careful guidance of Elinor Nicholson. The house had not been the scene of such vivacity since the Blaxland family had occupied it.

In 1923 Theo and Elinor bought The Hermitage and lived there until 1952. Five of their six children were born there. One of their daughters Elinor Catherine (Dr Catherine Hamlin AC) became famous for her work in obstetrics and gynaecology to women in Ethiopia. She has written a book about her life in which she gives some colourful details of her childhood at The Hermitage. She wrote:

When I was a child the house seemed huge with endless rooms and a big attic in which we could crawl about and play with all the old junk that had accumulated over the years. There were eight bedrooms. The upstairs attic rooms were rather poky, but my father had gable windows put in and then we had a beautiful view all the way down to the Parramatta River. Downstairs the rooms were wood panelled and there were wide verandahs in the front and back of the house. The garden was my mother’s special interest and delight. It was beautiful and, to me the most perfect garden I have ever been in..

— Dr Catherine Hamlin AC, 2001. The Hospital by the River: a Story of Hope.

Her brother Peter Nicholson also gave an account of his childhood at the house called “The Hermitage: Memories of the 1930s. He said that the property had orchards and vegetable gardens and that the family kept hens for eggs and had a cow that was milked. In 1997 Peter Nicholson, the third of the family's children (born 1926), recorded an account of his life there as a child and young adult. A copy of this is held by Ryde City Council. He recollected from his childhood in the 1920s and 1930s that the house was surrounded by paddocks and plenty of ground, somewhat isolated from the rest of the community. The family had orchards, grew its own vegetables, fowls, eggs, milk and that in those days tradespeople used to deliver goods. The butcher, greengrocer, fishmonger would come once a week. The baker would come. The family kept a boat in a shed (Hoyles Boat Shed) in Drummoyne. Mr Nicholson used to drive his car to work in the city, over roads so rough he would drive on the tram tracks to get a smooth ride. Mrs Nicholson had a car also.

The children had a nursery - playroom, upstairs. The upstairs rooms were recalled as "originally very pokey little rooms" and Mr Nicholson had the windows across the front of the house put in and made them habitable and with good views. A couple of the servants lived upstairs. The front verandah was not used much as it faced south and was cold. There were wooden columns covered with Ficus (probably dwarf creeping fig, Ficus pumila var.pumila. Peter recalled that when the CSIRO first went to the Hermitage they pulled out the front verandahs wooden columns and made unattractive sandstone ones. These have since been replaced with timber, and painted green. The family used the rear verandah more, which faced north and was sunny. The Nicholsons had the house's cedar joinery restored at one stage.

Elinor Nicholson was a great gardener and had an elaborate garden. She was so pleased with the appearance of the garden in c.1938 that she had photographer Harold Cazneaux take a series of photographs of it. She had a full-time gardener who lived in, and whose wife was the family's cook. The family kept a cow which the gardener milked, had a very big fowl yard and chooks. The grounds were extensive with a number of outbuildings, one of which was converted in the mid-1930s to a workshop for woodworking. Peter Nicholson's jobs included raking the long gravel drive every Saturday and to mow the lawns. Banana trees grew in the back (courtyard) garden. Behind that was an orchard with quite a few trees. Mrs Nicholson planted the sweet gum (Liquidambar styraciflua) in the centre of the back lawn (where apparently there was a well, covered over before the Nicholson's time) where the bananas had been. One of the boys planted an acorn around the other side of the house which grew into a considerable-sized tree.

There was a stable outside and an extra toilet. Peter Nicholson recollected that the same man who installed the sewer connection, a Mr McMahon from Pymble, also built the beautiful stone wall, parallel to the drive, in front of the house (enclosing the front flower garden and lawn with a central path to the front door) (the wall has since been demolished) and some crazy stone paving around the site. The family had a fishpond with a fountain in the side garden and extensive shrubberies. A stone table near a bird bath is shown in a photograph of two daughters from the 1940s.

During the war the family built a tennis court and had a lot of friends over for tennis on Saturdays. As the Ryde School was a long way (about a mile) away, Mrs Nicholson had a governess come to teach the three older children at home. This was the first of a number of governesses who came by day, not living in. Mrs Nicholson entertained a lot, missionaries from overseas and friends. She bought a house over Pennant Avenue at one stage to put up overseas missionaries, while they settled. She was a very keen Anglican and supported various missions. Mr Nicholson got involved in having a big Christian mission, erecting a big marquee in the cow paddock on the Blaxland Road frontage, once a year, with teaching sessions by day and night. Mrs Nicholson set up a Sunday School in the house for neighbouring children as she was worried they were so far from St. Anne's church and not going to it, or to Sunday School there.

The Sunday School grew so big the family had a separate hall erected in Pennant Avenue. It was a Hudson pre-cut building that could seat 50-60 people. When the property was sold to the CSIRO, one of the conditions was that this building had to be moved, and it was moved to East Denistone and became the focus of the church there.

Peter Nicholson recalls a Mr Roberts who lived at Wollondilly next to the Hermitage, and worked for the CSIRO wool research division. The head of this division, Dr Vic Burgmann, lived in Beecroft and it may have suited him well to have the division move to Ryde, close by.

=== CSIRO institutional use (1952-1996) ===
In 1952 the Australian Government bought the property as a permanent home for the recently formed Commonwealth Scientific and Industrial Research Organisation (CSIRO) wool textiles research laboratories unit. The first Officer-in-Charge was Victor Burgmann. The CSIRO further altered and added to The Hermitage. The garage was demolished and a lecture hall built in its place. The Igloo, fowl shed, tennis pavilion and tennis court were removed. A further ten large and several small buildings were built on the site.

It made immediate alterations including replacement of timber columns at south verandah with stone pillars, laboratories installed in attic, east wing and cellar, three windows in east wing bricked up, partition walls installed in several rooms, existing doors had glass inserted in upper panels, door from hall to dining room replaced with wider opening (and door reused at back hall entry), installed a reception desk in front hall, notice boards hung in outside walls of rear courtyard, rear verandah posts replaced with pipes, timber floorboards from rear verandah replaced with concrete floor, conservatory and servants' stair removed and front door stripped of paint.

Major alterations made to the garden including construction of ten large and several small buildings on the surrounding land, demolition of the garage and a lecture hall built in its place, igloo, fowl shed, tennis pavilion and court removed, new workshop built, temporary laboratory relocated from North Ryde to beside the workshop, driveway sealed off, wells were covered in and the rear yard level raised and the front gates were painted.

In 1953 the west verandah of east kitchen wing was replaced by a brick extension and the west wall of the wing and internal walls were demolished to house the lunch room and men's locker room.

In 1958 a second storey was added to the kitchen wing to house the library. A corrugated iron hipped roof above the west wing store rooms was replaced by a flat roof in 1959. Roof slates turned and roof battens replaced on main roof and east wing. Lead hip and ridge flashings replaced with galvanised steel equivalent. c. 1962 the front gates removed and driveway entry repositioned to existing location. c. 1960-65 a doorway was inserted from the rear passage to the Chief's room. The attic was partitioned off.

In 1970 a conference room added to kitchen wing. c. 1970 the benches in lunch room were remodelled. In February 1975 the library was extended above conference room. Also in the 1970s acousting panelling was hung on walls and ceilings of various rooms. In September 1982 The Hermitage was listed on the (now defunct) Register of the National Estate, resulting in conservation works beginning on site. In 1985-6 the laboratories were removed. Three formerly bricked-up windows in east wing were remade to match the single existing original by the CSIRO on-site works team. New window frames and sashes were installed and some of the non-original partitions were removed. The CSIRO occupied the site until July 1996 when its Division of Wool Technology relocated the Ryde Wool Textile functions to Geelong. Between the 1990s and 2000s the site was returned to private ownership, remaining unoccupied until the present owner, Maksim Holdings purchased the site. In 2001 restoration works commenced to the house. Between 2009 and 2012, further conservation works implemented to return site to appearance prior to arrival of the CSIRO.

In 2013 the house and gardens were purchased and is now in private hands. It is home to a local family.

== Description ==
The Subject Site is known as The Hermitage and Wollondilly. In 2003 it comprised 1.44 hectares (3.6 acres) with frontages onto Pennant Avenue, Anzac Avenue and Blaxland Road.

Grounds South of the house there are significant garden remains, including the gravel drive on its original alignment and a number of mature trees. The site of the well for the house is in the centre of the rear courtyard. From the garden there are panoramic views southward over Ryde and Parramatta.

House The Hermitage is an example of the Australian colonial house of the early Victorian period. The original house is a single storey residence with a hipped roof and verandahs. The front and side verandahs are flagged in sandstone The house has sandstone footings and brick walls. The bricks are red sandstocks without frog, although similar bricks with cinder are also widespread.

The building has three wings the main wing, and the east and west wings. The east wing is built of sandstock brick on a sandstone footing. It has a slate hipped roof. The west wing was originally single storey range of rooms with a pitched roof and gable ends. The footings are of sandstone and the surviving walls are of sandstock brick. The cellar is largely intact showing traces of a former lath and plaster ceiling. The cellar walls are of sandstone and the floor is flagged in sandstone. The interior retains many original features of quality including doors, joinery, staircase, cornices and hall screen doorway. Chimney pieces have been removed, wall surfaces renewed and various unsympathetic fixtures installed. Wall cladding and details in the attic area have been generally altered.

=== Condition ===
As at 14 August 2003 the physical condition was good. The areas affected by the proposal have been identified as: The grounds of the Hermitage and Wollondilly in the Archaeological Management Plan. The archaeological potential of these areas has been assessed as follows: While the historical appearance of the grounds of the house and its farm have been substantially changed with the advent of 20th century subdivision, it is likely that archaeological evidence of former occupation may survive in the form of archaeological relics and other structures not already identified by historical documentation. These relics and other features may survive in good condition, since the ground surface has not been substantially changed.

The site and building is a mixture of several periods of alterations.

=== Modifications and dates ===
- 1838–42 – built using bricks made on site – main block with 12 rooms, wrap around verandahs, western rear kitchen wing.
- c. 1860/1875 – two "bachelors rooms" (bedrooms) added to east wing and connected to main house by a curved screen wall. A west stables wing was built during this period
- 1869 – two orchard buildings existed and the house had a driveway connecting to Blaxland Road.
- c. 1875 – extensive farm improvements including a vineyard with gardener's cottage and wine house, orchard and associated outbuildings, dovecote, animal pens, paddocks and a stockyard
- c. 1884–1905 – virtually unoccupied and only occasionally let out to tenants including Tooth (1896) and Mason (1905).
- 1903–05 – transferred to O'Brien.
- 1905–19 – subdivided and sold (1905), subsequent auctions until 1919 further subdivided estate lands.
- 1907–10 – Stockdale was tenant
- 1910–22 – Lot 33, The Hermitage sold to James Pollock. House underwent major alterations c. 1911 – including a second stair to the attic added, two verandah rooms built, four french doors replaced south side windows, former study removed and eastern wall of the back stair replaced by brick wall supported on a steel beam. Study joinery reused in attic. Bathroom added to east passage. Elliptical arch opening between dining and drawing rooms cut and west-facing verandah added to kitchen wing.
- 1922–52 – Nicholson occupancy and further alterations made. Extended attic with addition of south facing dormer windows, bathroom added to east side of house's front verandah and a conservatory to the rear verandah, staircase rebuilt, window inserted in landing, four french doors inserted in pace of sash windows on northern side. Extensive garden changes included planting many trees, timber gate posts, stone wall on south side of drive, tennis court fence and pavilion, removal of rear east stables wing.
- 1930s – sewerage connection, replacing earlier septic tank system; mid-1930s: one outbuilding converted to a workshop
- 1937 – Sunday School held in the Hermitage
- c. 1945 – corrugated iron shed (igloo) installed at rear of west wing
- 1951 – Nicholson family left, taking garden sundial and the compilation of chimney pieces with the exception of the drawing room chimney piece.
- 1952–55 – Commonwealth acquisition (1952). Immediate alterations including replacement of timber columns at south verandah with stone pillars, laboratories installed in attic, east wing and cellar, three windows in east wing bricked up, partition walls installed in several rooms, existing doors had glass inserted in upper panels, door from hall to dining room replaced with wider opening (and door reused at back hall entry), installed a reception desk in front hall, notice boards hung in outside walls of rear courtyard, rear verandah posts replaced with pipes, timber floorboards from rear verandah replaced with concrete floor, conservatory and servants' stair removed and front door stripped of paint.

Major alterations made to the garden including construction of ten large and several small buildings on the surrounding land, demolition of the garage and a lecture hall built in its place, igloo, fowl shed, tennis pavilion and court removed, new workshop built, temporary laboratory relocated from North Ryde to beside the workshop, driveway sealed off, wells were covered in and the rear yard level raised and the front gates were painted.

- 1953 – west verandah of east kitchen wing was replaced by a brick extension and the west wall of the wing and internal walls demolished to house the lunch room and men's locker room.
- 1958 – second storey added to kitchen wing to house the library. Corrugated iron hipped roof above the west wing store rooms was replaced by a flat roof in 1959. Roof slates turned and roof battens replaced on main roof and east wing. Lead hip and ridge flashings replaced with galvanised steel equivalent.
- c. 1962 – front gates removed and driveway entry repositioned to existing location.
- c. 1960–65 – doorway inserted from rear passage to the Chief's room. Attic partitioned off.
- 1970 – conference room added to kitchen wing.
- c. 1970 – benches in lunch room remodelled.
- February 1975 – library extended above conference room
- 1970s – acoustic panelling hung on walls and ceilings of various rooms.
- September 1982 – listed on RNE resulting in conservation works beginning on site.
- 1985–86 – laboratories removed. Three formerly bricked-up windows in east wing remade to match the single existing original by the CSIRO on-site works team. New window frames and sahses installed and some of the non-original partitions were removed.
- July 1996 – CSIRO occupied the site until July when its Division of Wool Technology relocated the Ryde Wool Textile functions to Geelong, Victoria.
- 1990s–2000s – returned to private ownership, remaining unoccupied until the present owner, Maksim Holdings purchased the site.
- 2001 – restoration works commenced
- 2009–12 – further conservation works implemented to return site to appearance prior to arrival of the CSIRO.

=== Further information ===
The 1995 Ryde Heritage Conservation Strategy made a comparative study of all heritage items in the Ryde Council area. It ranked The Hermitage as having State significance and the conservation plan prepared by Perumal Murphy Wu endorses that finding based on the historic significance of the item.

== Heritage listing ==
As at 10 November 2000, The Hermitage was a rare (albeit altered) exemplar conforming entirely to the common perceived form of the Australian colonial house of the early Victorian period. It has high historic significance because of its association with the prominent pioneering Blaxland family and is directly related to another early Blaxland residence Brush Farm. The history of the property is a clear and typical example of the process of gentleman settlers amalgamating small farm grants to form their wealthy estates. The Hermitage is one of a small group of approximately five extant pre-1850 buildings in Ryde municipality which is the second earliest market garden settlement in Sydney. The Hermitage may be a very rare known surviving domestic work of the notable mid-nineteenth century architect John Bibb. The site is an important prominent element in the Parramatta River landscape and is a visual landmark. The broad landscape of the locality and the garden surrounding The Hermitage are the setting for a house of high cultural significance.

The archaeological remains of the Hermitage and surrounds have the potential of providing comparative evidence for the evolution of living and working conditions on large colonial estates in NSW and particularly those on the Cumberland Plain.

The Hermitage and Garden was listed on the New South Wales State Heritage Register on 2 April 1999 having satisfied the following criteria.

The place is important in demonstrating the course, or pattern, of cultural or natural history in New South Wales.

The site and The Hermitage has historical associations with the important pioneer Blaxland family, and is directly related to another early Blaxland residence, Brush Farm. There is some dispute but the Hermitage may be a very rare known surviving domestic work of the notable mid-nineteenth century architect John Bibb. It is one of a small group of approximately five extant pre-1850 buildings in Ryde Municipality which is the second earliest market garden settlement in Sydney. The site is a clear and typical example of "Pure Merino" land holders amalgamating settled market garden land grants, demonstrating the colonial process of wealthy families establishing dominant freehold gentlemans estates. It was once the former residence of the eminent physicist, Professor James Pollock. It was the site of a Sunday School conducted by the Nicholsan family in the 1930s.

The place is important in demonstrating aesthetic characteristics and/or a high degree of creative or technical achievement in New South Wales.

The Hermitage is a rare (albeit altered) exemplar conforming entirely to the common perceived form of the Australian colonial house of the early Victorian period. It contains original elements of individual joinery. The site is an important element in the Parramatta River landscape and a local visual landmark. The broad landscape of the locality and the garden surroundings are the setting for a house of high cultural significance. The garden contains six mature plants and part of the driveway which are the original to a building of high cultural significance.

The place has potential to yield information that will contribute to an understanding of the cultural or natural history of New South Wales.

The hermitage and its site contain a resource for the study of the architecture and landscape of a suburban dating back to the 1830s. The site contains a unique resource for the conservation and interpretation of the place. The specimen of Bauhinia leichardtii in The Hermitage garden is very rare as one of the two specimens known to be in the Sydney region (the other is at Camden Park).

The place possesses uncommon, rare or endangered aspects of the cultural or natural history of New South Wales.

The surviving original fabric of the main, east and west wings and the sandstone extension is a rare but altered example of an early colonial house.

The place is important in demonstrating the principal characteristics of a class of cultural or natural places/environments in New South Wales.

The site and The Hermitage belong to a small group of approximately ten important historic and architecturally significant sites in the Ryde area.

== Gallery ==
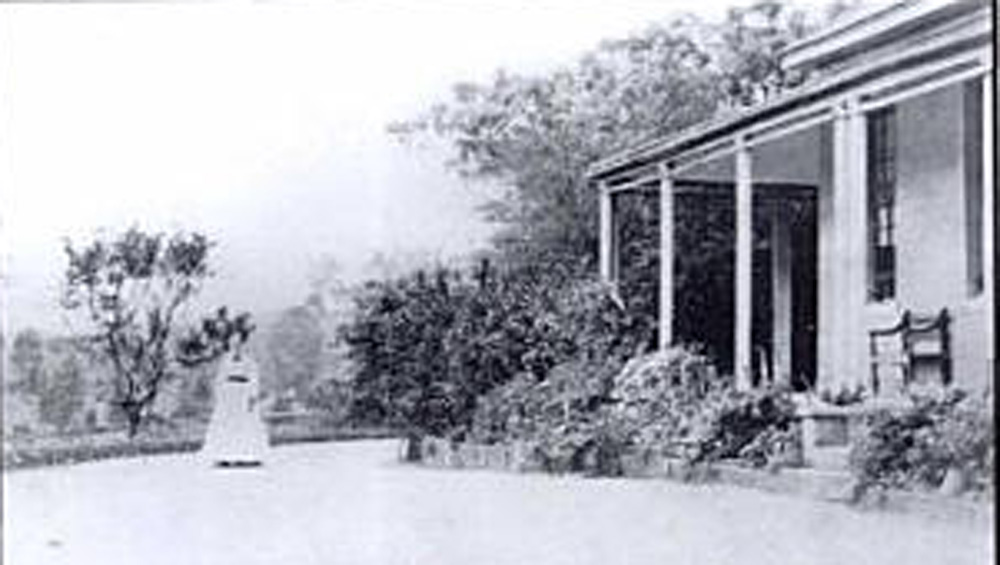
The Hermitage, Denistone (side of the house) circa 1872 at the time that the Blaxland family were in residence.

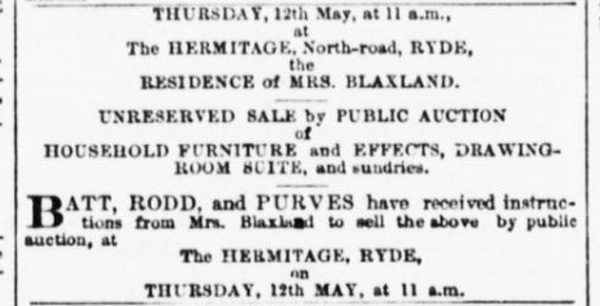
Advertisement in the Sydney Morning Herald in 1887 for the sale of furniture from the Hermitage placed by Ellen Blaxland.

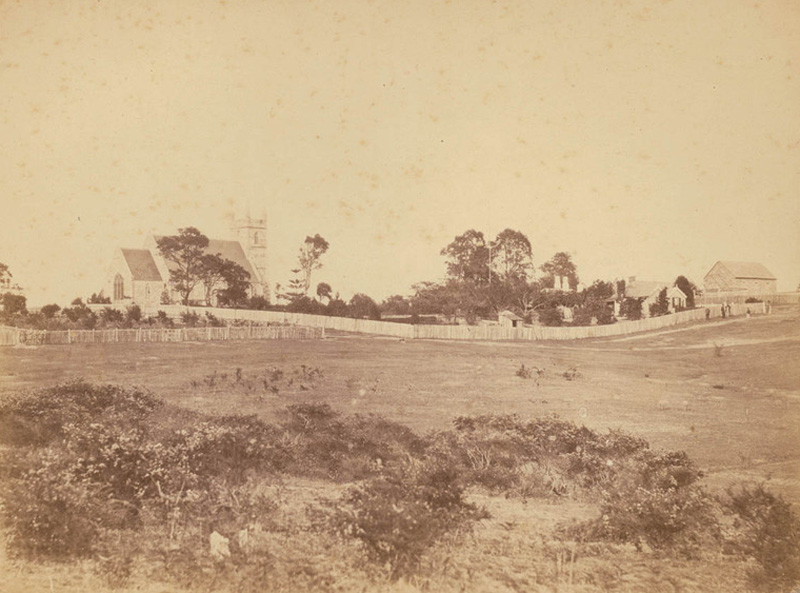
St Anne's Church and surrounding area in Ryde in 1863 at the time the Blaxland family lived at the Hermitage

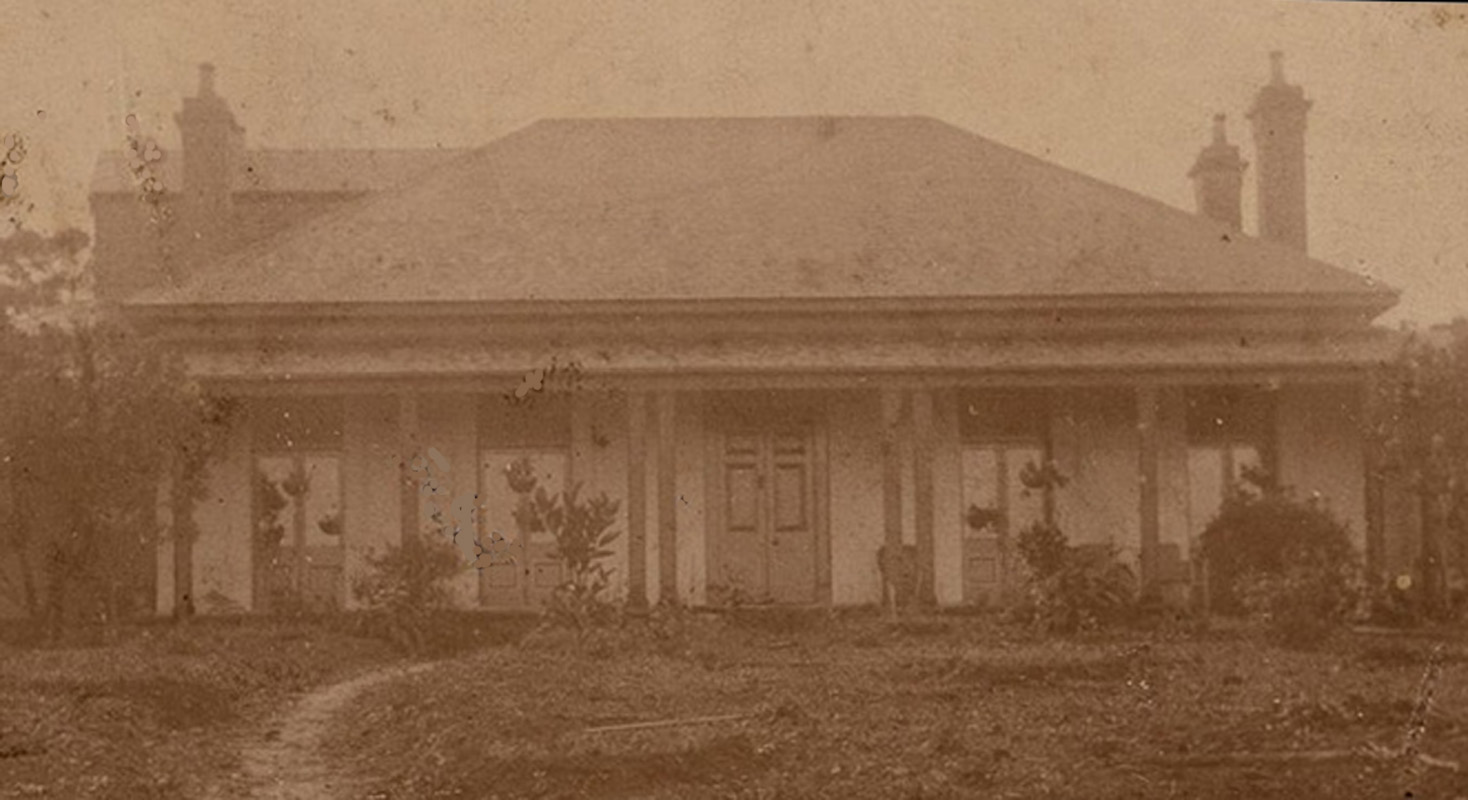
The Hermitage when it was owned by the Blaxland family

== See also ==
- Australian residential architectural styles
