= Denistone West =

- Suburb
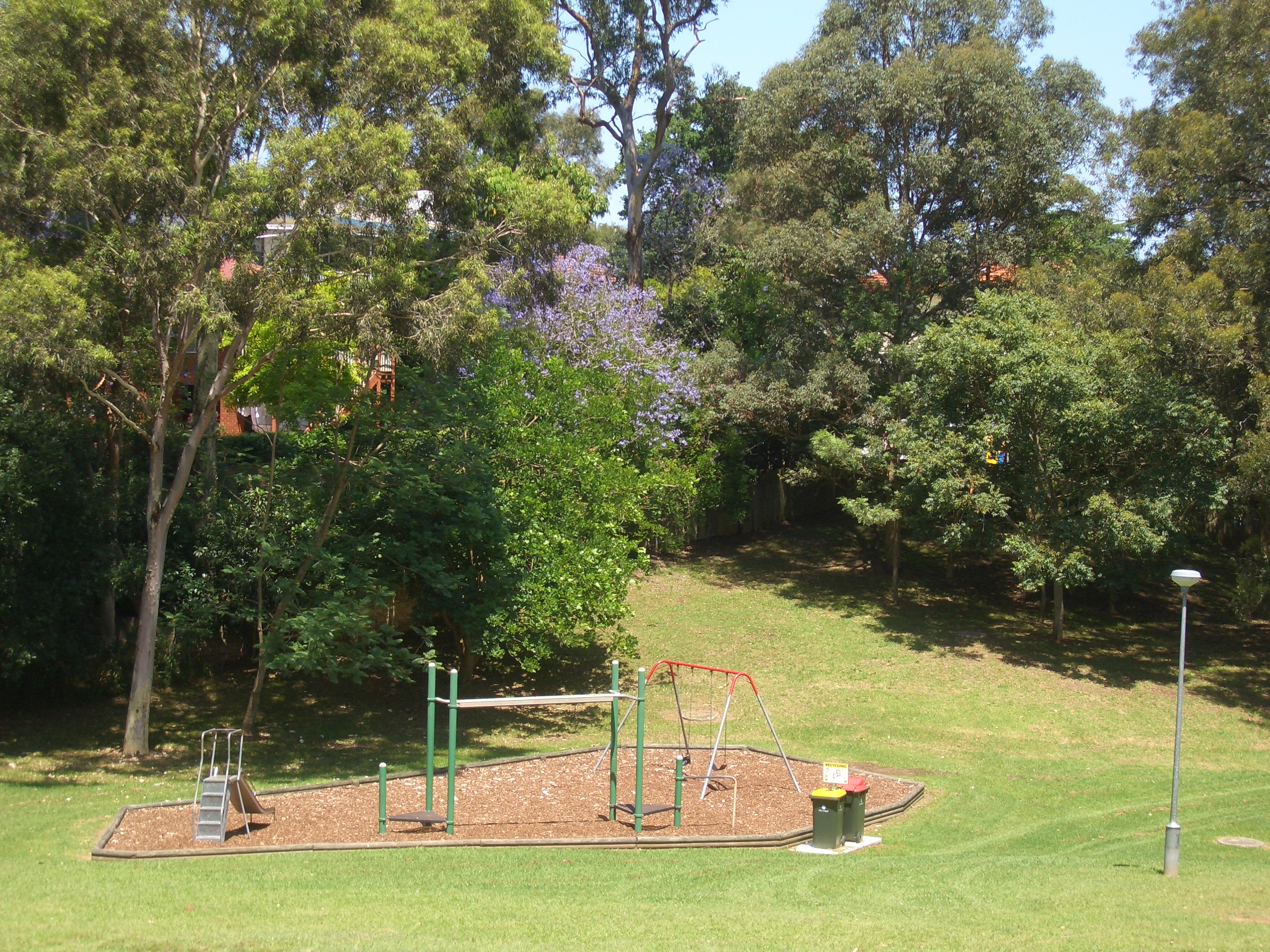
- West Denistone Park

- Interactive map of Denistone West
- Country: Australia
- State: New South Wales
- City: Sydney
- LGA: City of Ryde
- Location: 16 km (9.9 mi) north-west of Sydney CBD
- Established: 5 February 1999

Government
  - State electorate: Ryde
  - Federal division: Bennelong

Area
  - Total: 0.3 km^{2} (0.12 sq mi)
- Elevation: 62 m (203 ft)

Population
  - Total: 947 (SAL 2021)
- Postcode: 2114
Suburbs around Denistone West
Eastwood	Eastwood	Eastwood
West Ryde	Denistone West	Denistone
West Ryde	West Ryde	West Ryde

Denistone West is a suburb in Northern Sydney, in the state of New South Wales, Australia. Denistone West is located 16 kilometres north-west of the Sydney central business district in the local government area of the City of Ryde. Denistone and Denistone East are separate suburbs; Denistone West was gazetted as a suburb in its own right on 5 February 1999.

== Parks ==
Denistone West has several parks, including West Denistone Park, Lynn Park, Rutherford Park and Hibble Park. West Denistone Park was featured briefly in an episode of Season 43 of Play School on the ABC.

== Transport ==
Denistone railway station is situated in the suburb of Denistone. Denistone West is serviced by one Busways routes, 544, which connect to Eastwood, Auburn and Macquarie Park.

At the 2021 census, 4.2% of employed people travelled to work on public transport and 35.8% by motor vehicle and 44.7% of people worked from home (these statistics may be affected by the COVID-19 lockdown in New South Wales); this is in comparison to the 2016 Census when 66.8% of people were driving to work, 23.9% used public transport - 18.7% of those used the train at some part of their journey - and 3.2% of people worked from home.

== Commercial ==
The commercial and retail hub of Denistone West is the boutique West Denistone Shopping Centre. Major tenants include a vet & a hairdresser. An Australia Post post box is installed nearby the centre. The shopping area also includes a small car park, notable for its unique valet parking service.

== Demographics ==
=== Population ===
As of the 2021 census Denistone West had a population of 947 people and 0.5% of respondents identifying as aboriginal.

The distribution of ages in Denistone West was reasonably similar to the country as a whole. The median age was 42 years, compared to the national median of 38. Children aged under 15 years made up 20.2% of the population (the national average was 18.2%) and people aged 65 years and over made up 19.0% of the population (the national average was 17.2%).

=== Ethnic diversity ===
58.9% of people were born in Australia. The next most common countries of birth were China (excluding Special Administrative Regions and Taiwan) at 11.9%, South Korea at 3.6%, Hong Kong (SAR of China) at 3.1%, England at 2.3% and India at 2.1%.
54.3% of residents only spoke English at home, other languages spoken at home included Mandarin at 12.8%, Cantonese at 8.2%, Korean at 4.0%, Arabic at 3.6% and Greek at 0.8%.

=== Religion ===
The most common responses for religion were No Religion at 33.9%, Catholic at 30.4%, Anglican at 13.8%, Buddhism at 3.4% and Uniting Church at 3.1%.

=== Income ===
Denistone West had an average household income of $2,579 (the national average for the 2021 Census was $1,746), a personal income of $855 (the national average for the 2021 Census was $805) and a family income of $2,750 (the national average for the 2021 Census was $2,120).

=== Housing ===
The great majority (86.4%) of private dwellings in Denistone West were family households. Separate houses accounted for 96.0% of dwellings, with 2.0% of private dwellings being semi-detached houses (such as a townhouse or row or terrace house) and apartments and flats making up 2.3% of private dwellings. The average household size was 3.1 people.

== Media ==
Two free newspapers are home delivered weekly, the Northern District Times and The Weekly Times.
