= West Ryde railway station =

Railway station in Sydney, New South Wales, Australia

West Ryde
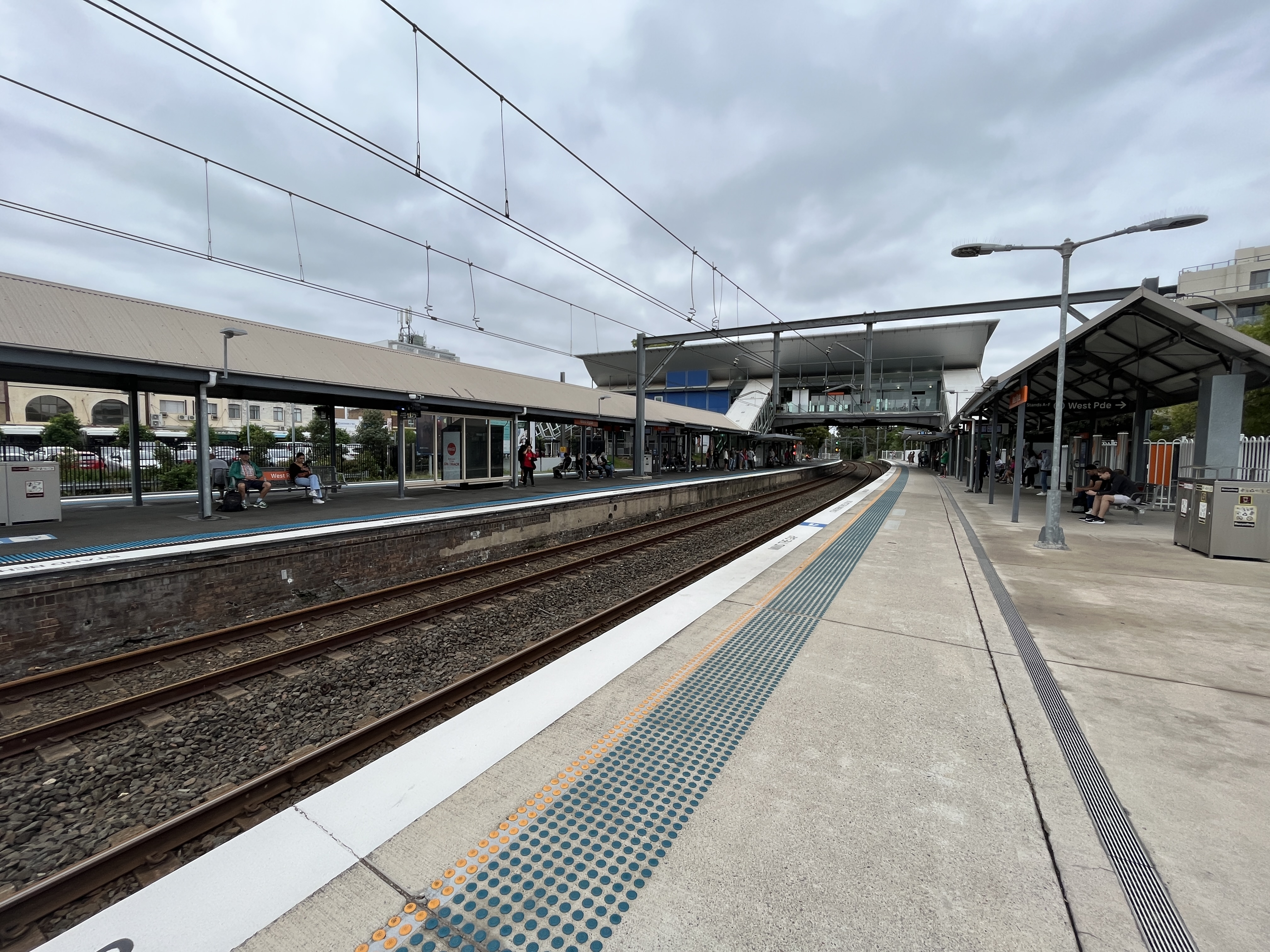
- Southbound view from Platform 3, showing the station concourse and platform shelters in February 2024

General information
- Location: West Parade, West Ryde; Sydney, New South Wales; Australia
- Coordinates: 33°48′26″S 151°05′25″E
- Elevation: 28 metres (92 ft)
- Owner: Transport Asset Manager of NSW
- Operator: Sydney Trains
- Line: Main North
- Distance: 19.20 km (11.93 mi) from Central
- Platforms: 3 (1 island, 1 side)
- Tracks: 3
- Connections: Bus

Construction
- Structure type: Ground
- Accessible: Yes

Other information
- Status: Staffed
- Station code: WSR
- Website: Transport for NSW

History
- Opened: 17 September 1886 (139 years ago)
- Electrified: Yes (from January 1929)
- Former names: Ryde (1886–1945)

Passengers
- 2023: 2,355,130 (year); 6,452 (daily) (Sydney Trains, NSW TrainLink)

Services
Preceding station	Sydney Trains	Following station
Denistone towards Hornsby	Northern Line	Meadowbank towards Gordon via Central
Location

West Ryde railway station is a suburban railway station located on the Main North line, serving the Sydney suburb of West Ryde. It is served by Sydney Trains T9 Northern Line services.

== History ==
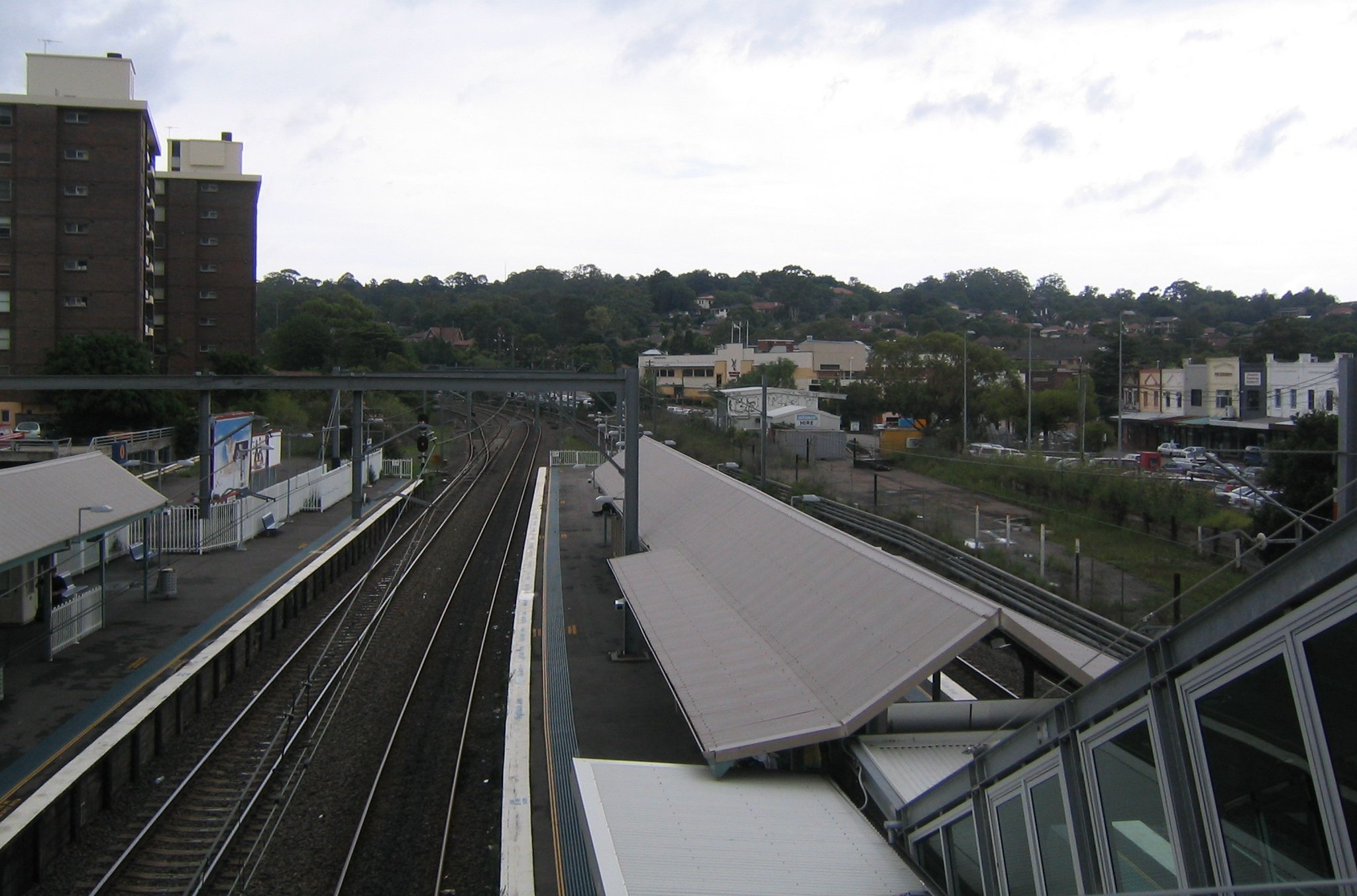
Looking north from the footbridge the diverging outbound tracks can be seen, the old goods shed and goods yard area are visible to the right

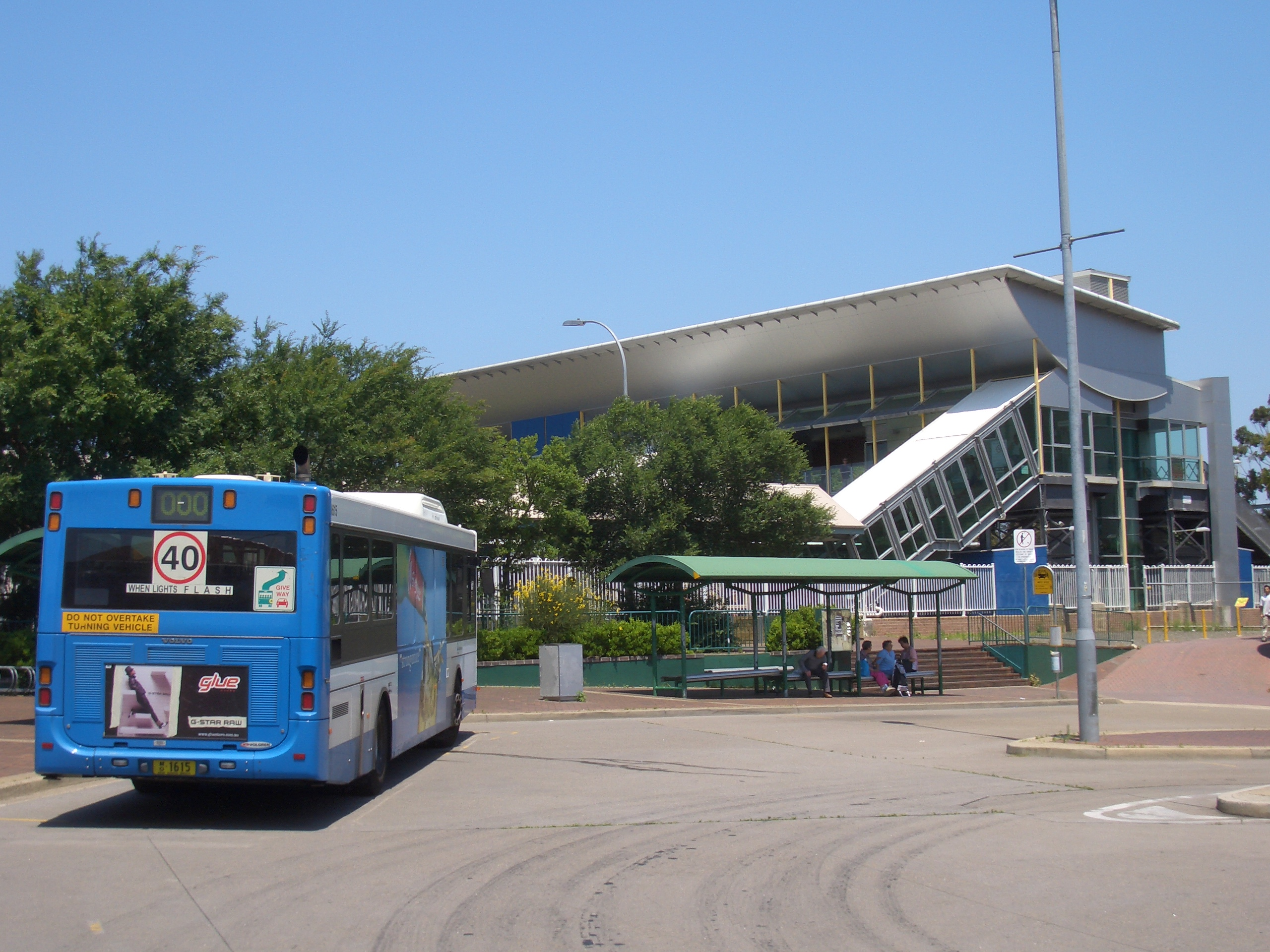
West Ryde railway station bus interchange

West Ryde station opened on 17 September 1886 as Ryde, being renamed West Ryde on 8 October 1945. Immediately north of the station, a loop that runs to Epping commences. This opened on 24 October 1978. On 27 November 1989, a southbound loop from Eastwood opened, this resulted in the existing southbound platform being converted to an island platform.

The station was upgraded extensively with a new concourse and lifts in 2004.

=== Signalling ===
West Ryde Signal Box was a timber structure situated on the city end of Platform 3. Until 1937 it controlled a level crossing on Victoria Road. Also situated at West Ryde was a Water Board siding and a connection to the former tram network, which provided for transfer of vehicles between light and heavy rail systems. It was closed in 1982, when control was transferred to Epping signal box. In 2019, control of this section was transferred to the new Rail Operations Centre at Alexandria.

There are a number of points and crossovers at West Ryde. The two closest to either end of the platforms are the start and end of the Up/Down Suburban. The suburban tracks are used by intercity Central Coast & Newcastle Line trains to overtake slower suburban Northern line trains making all stops. They are also occasionally used to overtake slow moving freight trains. The two crossovers to the south are emergency crossovers which cannot be controlled by the signal box. There are levers beside these crossovers which can be used to terminate trains or run them 'wrong road' (on the track for the opposite direction) if there is an incident on the line ahead.

=== Lachlan Valley Railway ===
During the 1980s West Ryde was the site of the Sydney Depot for the Lachlan Valley Railway. The station used to have a small goods yard servicing a freight shed and a siding running up to the West Ryde Pumping station. The Lachlan Valley Railway vacated the site in August 1987.

== Services ==
=== Platforms ===
Platform	Line	Stopping pattern	Notes
1	T9	8 weekday morning peak and 8 weekday afternoon peak services to Central	
2	T9	Southbound services to Gordon via Strathfield & North Sydney	
3	T9	Northbound services to Hornsby	

=== Transport links ===
West Ryde has a bus interchange on the western side of the station, rebuilt in the early 2000s. It is served by the following Busways routes:

Stand A

- 513: to Carlingford Court
- 523: to Parramatta Station
- 524: to Parramatta Station

Stand B

- School busses only

Stand C

- Arrivals only

Stand D

- School busses only

Stand E (Victoria Road)

- 52: to City Hyde Park
- 513: to West Ryde Station Stand C
- 523: to West Ryde Station Stand C
- 524: to West Ryde Station Stand C
- N80: to Hornsby station

Stand F (Victoria Road)

- 52: to Parramatta Station
- 513: to Carlingford Court
- 523: to Parramatta Station
- 524: to Parramatta Station
- N80: to Town Hall station

Stand G (Ryedale Road)

- 501: to Railway Square

Stand H (Ryedale Road)

- School busses only
