= West Ryde =

- Suburb
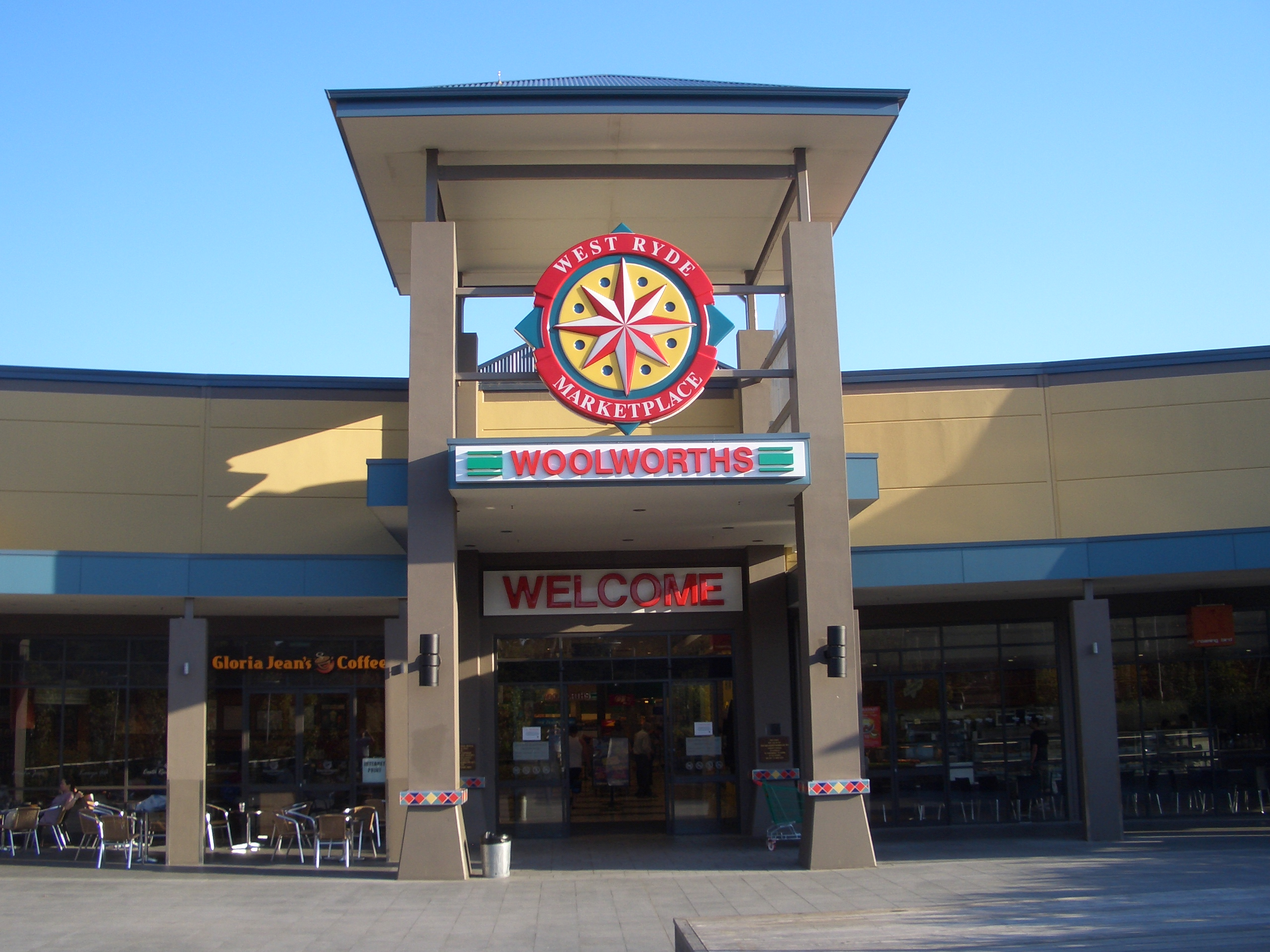
- West Ryde Marketplace

- Interactive map of West Ryde
- Country: Australia
- State: New South Wales
- Region: Northern Sydney
- City: Sydney
- LGA: City of Ryde
- Location: 15 km (9.3 mi) north-west of Sydney CBD

Government
  - State electorate: Ryde
  - Federal division: Bennelong

Area
  - Total: 3.57 km^{2} (1.38 sq mi)
- Elevation: 27 m (89 ft)

Population
  - Total: 13,171 (2021 census)
  - Density: 3,689/km^{2} (9,555/sq mi)
- Postcode: 2114
Suburbs around West Ryde
Eastwood	Denistone West	Denistone
Ermington	West Ryde	Denistone East
Melrose Park	Meadowbank	Ryde

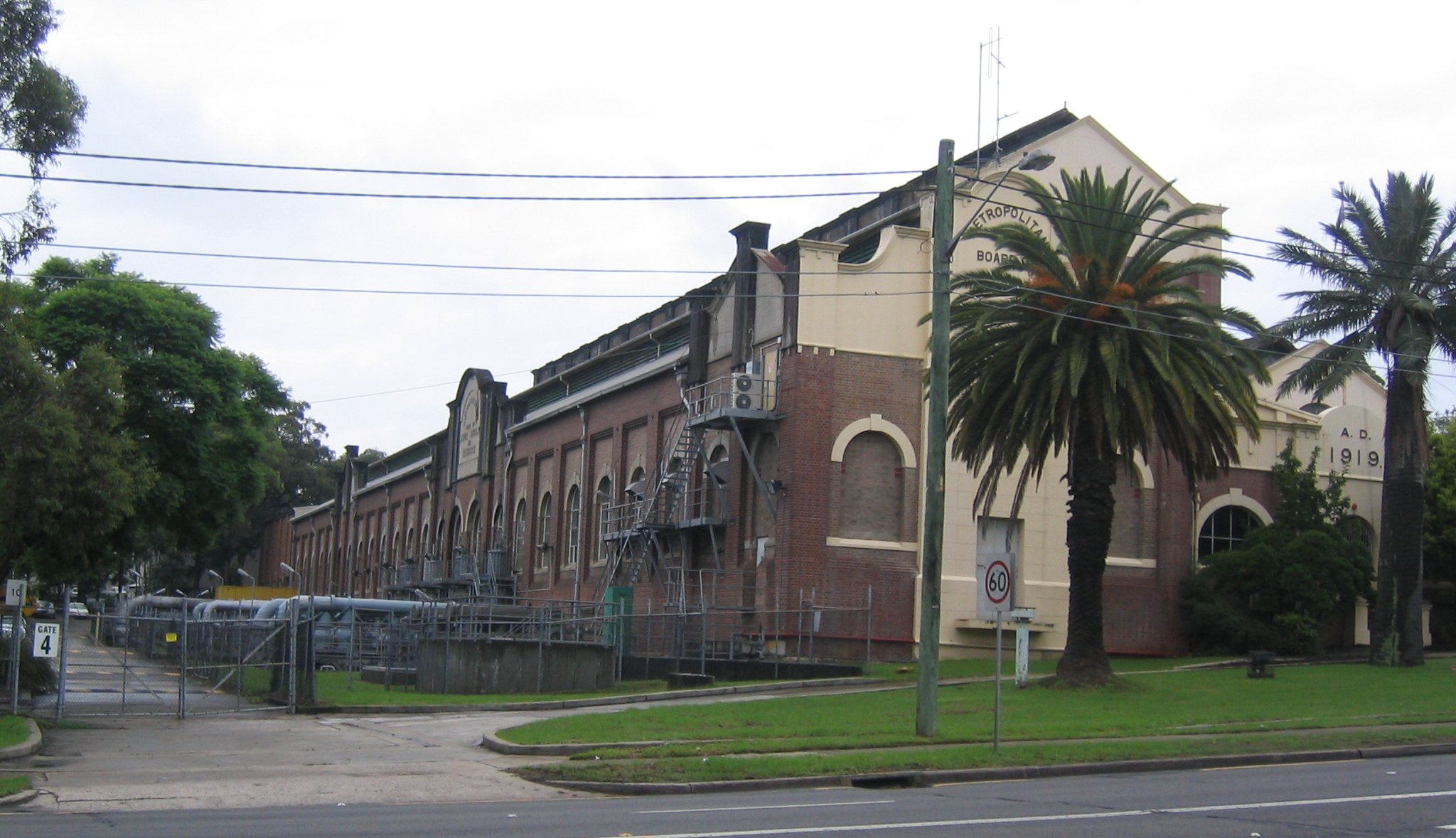
West Ryde pumping station, Victoria Road (1890)

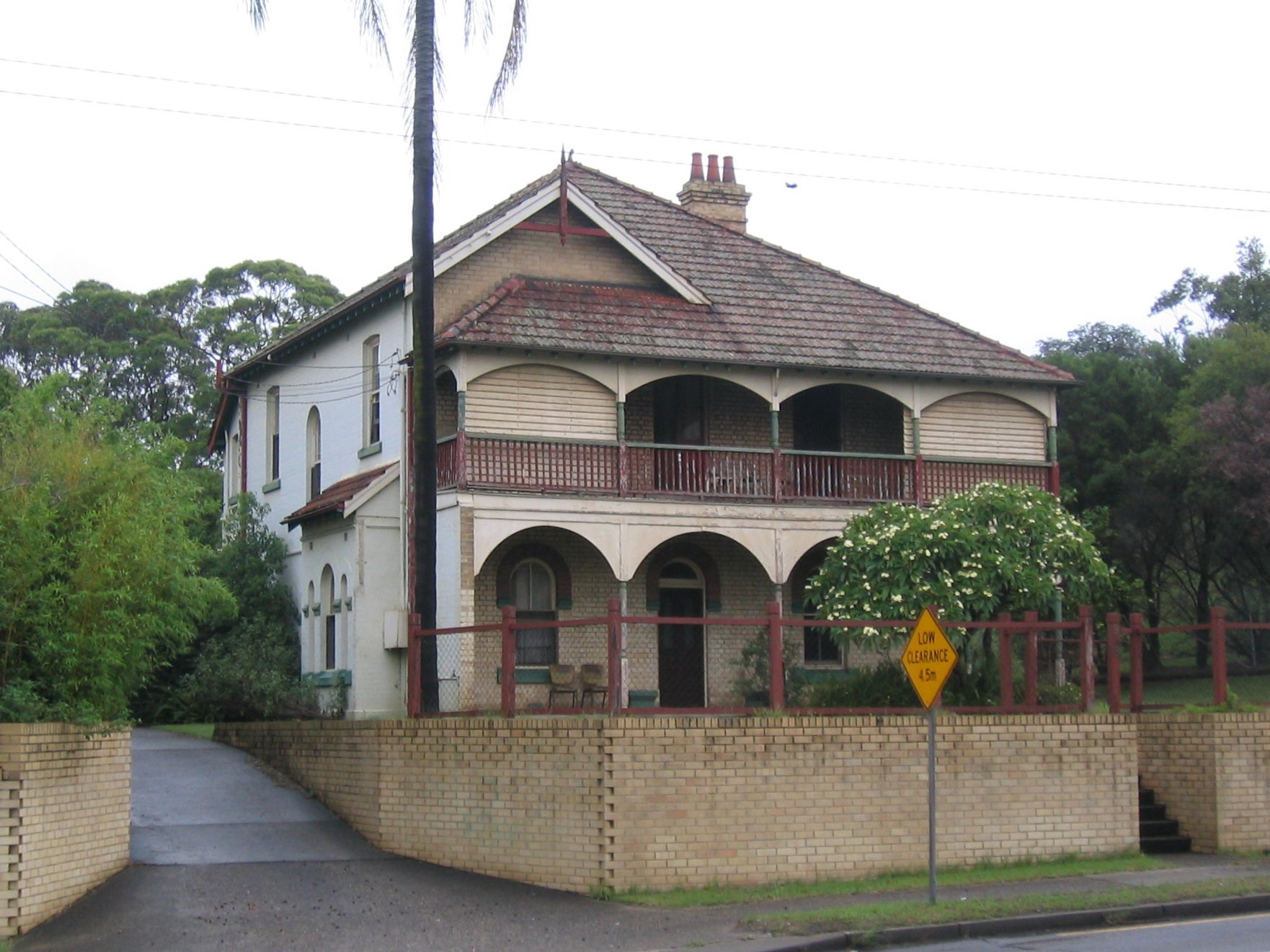
Pumping station manager's home, Victoria Road

West Ryde is a suburb of Sydney, in the state of New South Wales, Australia. West Ryde is located 16 kilometres north-west of the Sydney central business district, in the local government area of the City of Ryde and is part of the Northern Sydney region.

Ryde, North Ryde and East Ryde are separate suburbs. The suburbs of Denistone, Denistone West, Meadowbank and Melrose Park share the 2114 postcode with West Ryde.

== History ==
West Ryde is an extension of Ryde, which was named after the 'Ryde Store', a business run by G.M. Pope. He adopted the name from his birthplace of Ryde on the Isle of Wight, UK.

West Ryde is one of 16 suburbs that form the City of Ryde. The City of Ryde is approximately 12 kilometres (7.5 mi) from the centre of Sydney and occupies most of the land between the Parramatta and Lane Cove rivers. It is bisected from west to east by one of Sydney's busiest roads, Victoria Road. It is crossed north to south by another main road, Lane Cove Road, and is skirted on the north-west by the M2 Hills Motorway and Epping Road. At the time of the arrival of Europeans at Sydney Cove in January 1788, the Wallumedegal or Wallumede were the traditional owners of the area and they called it Wallumetta. This clan formed part of a large Dharug language group.

=== Early landholders ===
Throughout much of the nineteenth century, most of the land in West Ryde, Eastwood and Denistone was consolidated in a handful of large estates owned by a few of the colonial elites, notably the Blaxland and the Darvall families. Much of the land in this suburb lying to the west of the main northern railway line was originally granted to Dr William Balmain in the mid to late 1790s. Balmain was one of the assistant surgeons on the First Fleet, having sailed on the Alexander. He worked as a magistrate in the colony and, due to the shortage of money at that time, was paid with the labour of convicts to work on his land. However, it is not known how much clearing and cultivation was done during those years. In 1801 Balmain and his family returned to England, where he died in 1803. His heirs were Jane and John Henderson, his children by a convict woman, Margaret Dawson (Henderson was his mother's maiden name). While they were in England, the land was rented by the explorer Gregory Blaxland, who owned nearby Brush Farm. In 1818 the Balmain lands were sold to an ex-convict John Bennett. His nephew William was his heir. Soon after he inherited the land, William married Susan Brown. Initially the couple lived in John's old house which was near the intersection of Bellevue and Bigland avenues, but in 1836 they mortgaged part of their land to build a new house in what is now Meadowbank Park, Meadowbank. Major Edward Darvall and his family arrived in the colony in January 1840. He was a retired English army officer with strong family connections to the British East India Company. His wife Emily came from a long line of wealthy London merchants. In May 1840, the Darvalls leased Deniston Farm and 40 hectares (100 acres) of land from a Dr Forster, for a period of 12 years. However, the property was again advertised to let in The Sydney Morning Herald on 8 March 1849. In 1855 William and Susan Bennett sold all their land north of Victoria Road to Major Darvall. The Darvall property stretched from Shaftsbury Road to Ryedale Road and from Rowe Street to Victoria Road, a total of 150 hectares (360 acres). They built a two-storey house, Ryedale House, during the late 1850s, now the site of St Columb's Anglican Church. The house was constructed of sandstone blocks. Ryedale House was moved to Paterson (near Maitland), NSW. It is believed the Ryedale Estate was so named because of its closeness to Ryde and because Major Darvall came from the Yorkshire dales. The 20 hectares (50 acres) nearest the house were planted with orchards, mainly citrus trees. The Darvalls lived in this house for nearly 70 years – Edward until his death in 1869, his widow Jane until 1899, their son Anthony until 1910 and Anthony's widow Kate until 1922.

=== The railway and subdivision ===
In the 1880s, with the building of the Main North railway line from Strathfield to Hornsby, some estates were subdivided along its route. Landowners like Mrs Darvall sold parcels of their estates to the colonial government and by 1883 construction was well advanced. The Meadowbank Railway Bridge across the Parramatta River was completed in August 1886 and was followed by the opening of a single line track from Strathfield to Hornsby on 17 September 1886. Ryde (now called West Ryde) was one of the seven stations of this line and one of only two that were built of brick. The new railway platforms at both West Ryde and Eastwood did not service commuters. They were for freight.

By the end of the nineteenth century, some Darvall land had been sold, yet the bulk of the Ryedale Estate remained intact. Anthony Darvall started subdividing the land after his mother's death. The first subdivisions were between Clanalpine and Rowe streets (Eastwood) in the north and between Anthony Road and West Parade in the south-east. Eventually Ryedale House and a small parcel of land were sold to the Anglican Church in the 1930s.

The house was used as a rectory until the early 1970s when it was bought by private individuals who removed it, stone by stone, and re-erected it on a rural property in the Hunter Valley. All that remains at the original site (apart from the old and new churches) is a small group of buildings, one of which is two-storey, with a blank end wall. This was a brick extension added to Ryedale House around 1900, probably when Anthony William and his family took up residence. Other twentieth-century subdivisions proposed included the Ryde New Township Estate in the Falconer and Hermitage Road area in 1906.

By 1909 Ryde Heights, which was located on the southern side of Blaxland Road between Benson Lane and Melville Street was advertised as 'the pick of the district – 10 special residential sites for high class houses overlooking the windings of the Parramatta River'. The sixth and last subdivision of the Darvall Estate was the Outlook Estate, in the Denistone area. The 124 homes sites were advertised for private sale in 1929. The houses were built during the 1930s and 1940s.

=== Naming of West Ryde ===
Subdivision plans up to 1936 still advertised the railway station in West Ryde as Ryde Railway Station. This had been a source of contention for some time. Owing to the distance from Ryde village and the growth of this new settlement west of Ryde, the use of the term Ryde for the railway station soon became anomalous. In 1908 the Ermington-Rydalmere Council tried unsuccessfully to persuade Ryde aldermen that the name should be Ermington. West Ryde as a locality was gradually evolving. It was officially designated a postal area in October 1926. West Ryde Public School was called Meadowbank until 1930. In 1929 an attempt was made to change the name of the station to West Ryde. This request, reiterated from time to time, was finally granted in October 1945. West Ryde has a busy commercial centre based around Victoria Road and the railway station. The beginnings of a commercial centre here followed the opening of the railway in 1886 and the subdivision of the Meriam Hill Estate on the eastern side of the railway in 1888. The railway hotel was built on the corner of Victoria and Ryedale Roads in 1892 and a handful of shops established themselves nearby in the following decade. West Ryde's shopping centre was transformed in the 1950s, on the initiative of Bill Graf, a developer with an eye on the rapidly developing residential area just to the west. It was here that the Dundas Valley Estate was emerging as the largest Housing Commission project in Sydney. In a period of three years, more than 40 new shops were built, as well as six banks, two restaurants, a service station and a new post office.

=== Ryde Pumping Station ===
The Ryde Pumping Station is a significant piece of infrastructure located in West Ryde. The Sydney Water Board had taken over the water supply for Sydney from the City Council in 1888. Almost immediately, a temporary pumping station was established at North Sydney. It was dismantled in 1892 when supply became available from a new station built in West Ryde that same year. By 1908 the station had switched to steam turbines, a first for the Board and possibly for Australia. The present Ryde Pumping Station was built on adjacent land and opened in September 1921. The old station ceased operating in 1930, its remaining plant was auctioned and the pump house was used as a store. The building was demolished in 1961. The Ryde Pumping Station, now fully electrically operated, supplies water to many Northern Sydney suburbs. It is the largest water pumping station in Australia.

== Heritage listings ==
West Ryde has a number of heritage-listed sites, including:

- 135 Marsden Road: Riverview House, West Ryde
- Victoria Road: Ryde Pumping Station

== Commercial areas ==
West Ryde is home to a commercial area close to West Ryde railway station and the Sydney Water Station, which pumps water to most of northern Sydney.

West Ryde Marketplace is a medium-sized shopping centre featuring a Woolworths supermarket, specialty shops and West Ryde Public Library. Since the new centre opened in 2005, it diverted many people from the ageing Top Ryde Shopping Square, which subsequently closed and has now been redeveloped. Further building development included a Coles supermarket.

== Transport ==
West Ryde railway station is on the Main Northern line. A bus interchange sits adjacent the station with services of 500N, 500X, 501, 523 524 and 543.

At the 2021 census, 32.2% of employed people travelled to work by car (either as a driver or as a passenger) and 9.2% by public transport.

== Housing ==
The types of dwellings in West Ryde continues to shift away from the traditional separate houses and towards strata living. At the 2021 census, 46.3% of occupied private dwellings were flats, units or apartments, 41.5% were separate houses and 11.1% were semi-detached (mostly town houses). The average household size was 2.5 people.

West Ryde has a number of historical buildings including Addington, the second oldest extant building in Australia. The domestic architecture of the suburb largely consists of homes on quarter-acre blocks displaying most of the archetypical Australian styles, including Federation houses, Californian Bungalows, Depression-era houses of weatherboard or fibro with corrugated iron roofs, and 1960s red-brick housing. There is also a substantial number of Askin-era red-brick apartment blocks atop half-acre concrete expanses.

In the past, West Ryde was a working-class suburb which was home to many factories, especially towards Meadowbank. However, the factories of the past are slowly succumbing to demolition, and the construction of waterfront apartments are taking their place, with views of Parramatta River and Sydney Olympic Park, thus the suburb is growing with affluence.

== Demographics ==
At the 2021 census, West Ryde recorded a population of 13,171. Of these:

Age distribution
West Ryde residents' median age was 37 years, compared to the national median of 38. Children aged 0–14 years made up 16.7% of the population (the national average was 18.2%) and people aged 65 years and over made up 14.9% of the population (the national average was 17.2%).
Ethnic diversity
44.7% of people were born in Australia. The most common countries of birth were China 10.6%, South Korea 6.1%, India 5.3%, Philippines 3.3% and Hong Kong 2.9%. 41.7% of people only spoke English at home. Other languages spoken at home included Mandarin 12.3%, Cantonese 7.2%, Korean 7.3%, Arabic 2.9% and Hindi 1.9%.
Religion
The most common responses for religion were No Religion 33.6%, Catholic 23.6% and Hinduism 7.1%.
Income
The average weekly household income in West Ryde was $1,983, above the national average of $1,746.
Living arrangements
69.0% of households were family households, 26.6% were single person households and 4.4% were group households.

== Notable residents ==
- Jed Gillespie, rugby union player

== Gallery ==
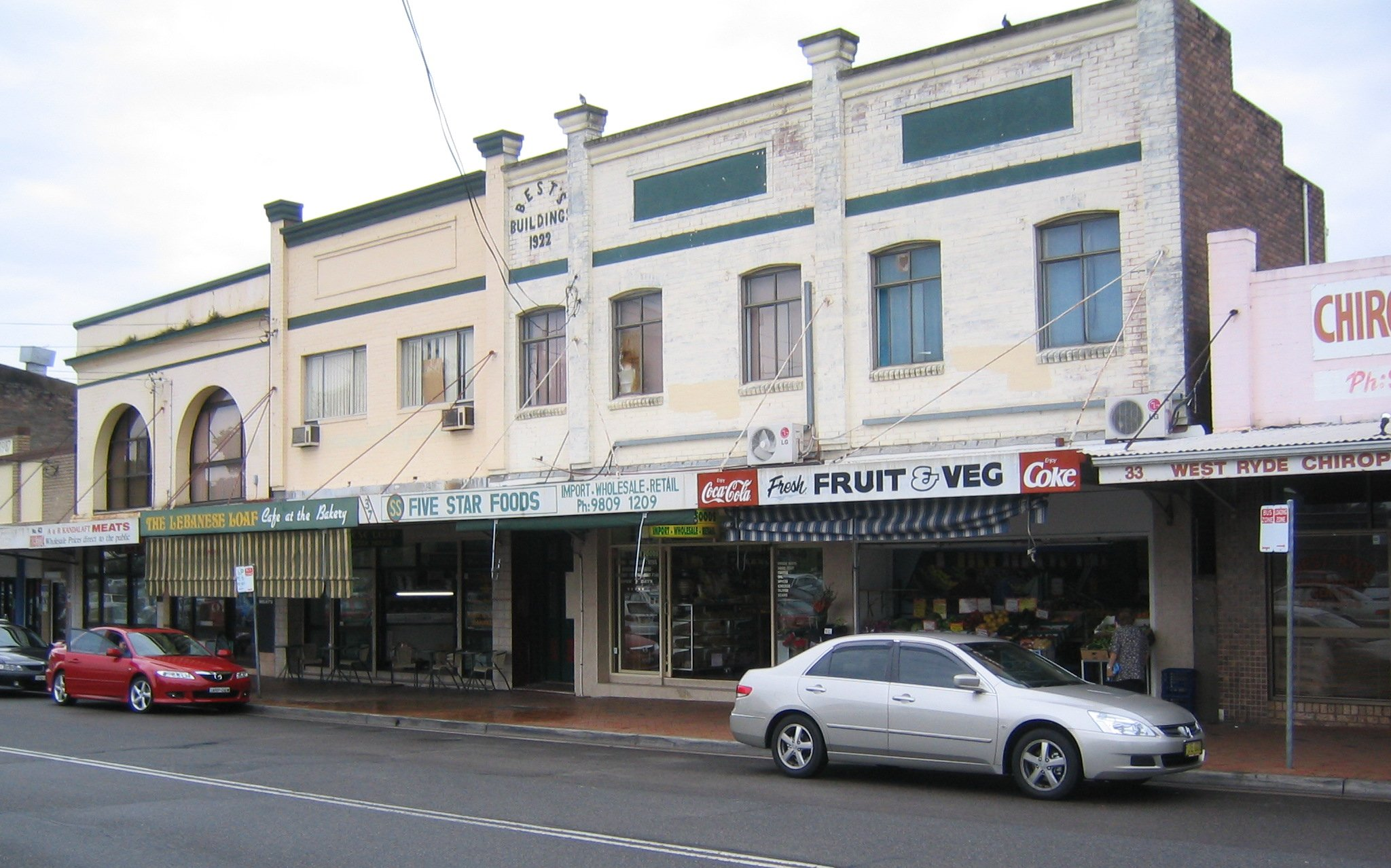
Ryedale Road shops

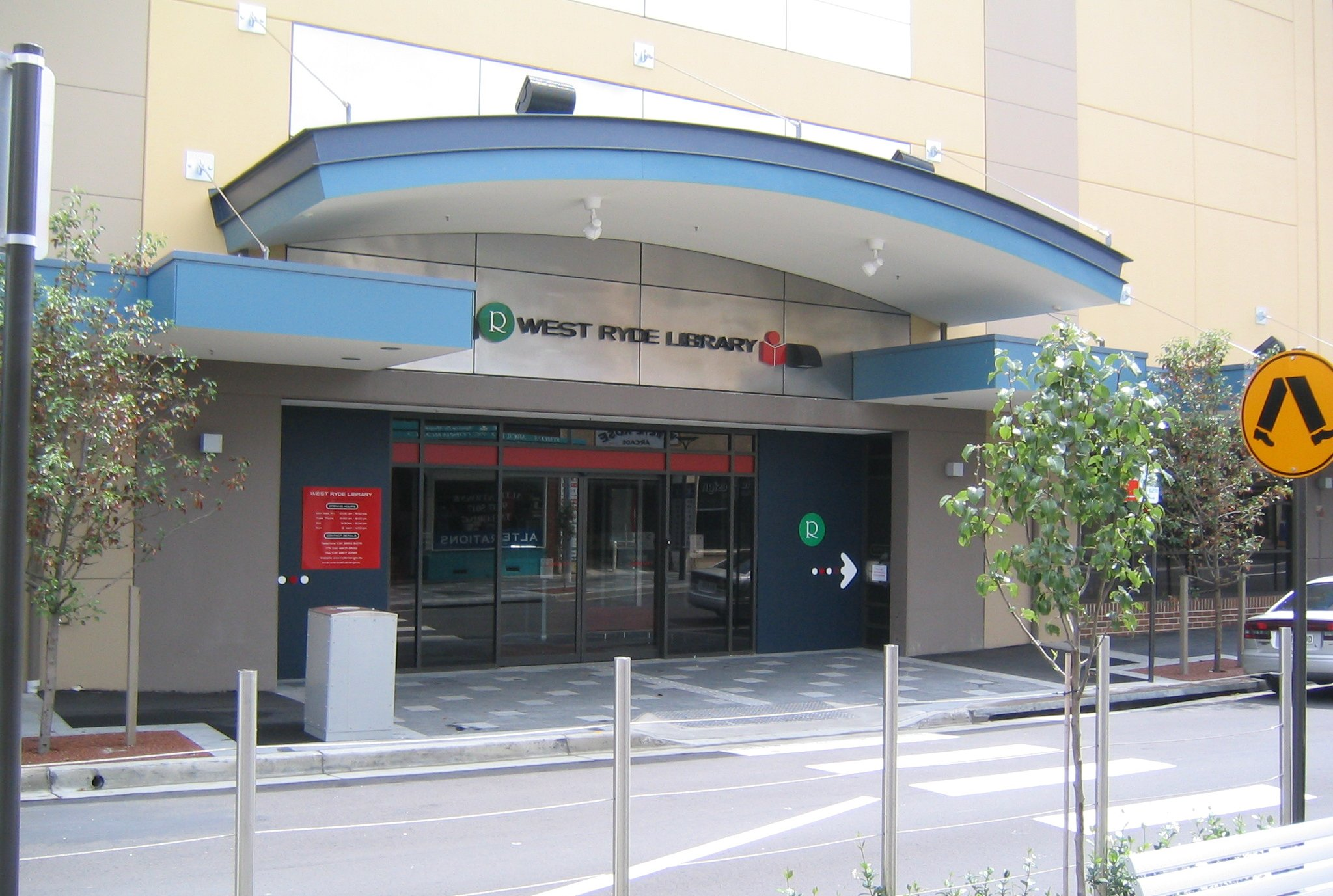
West Ryde library

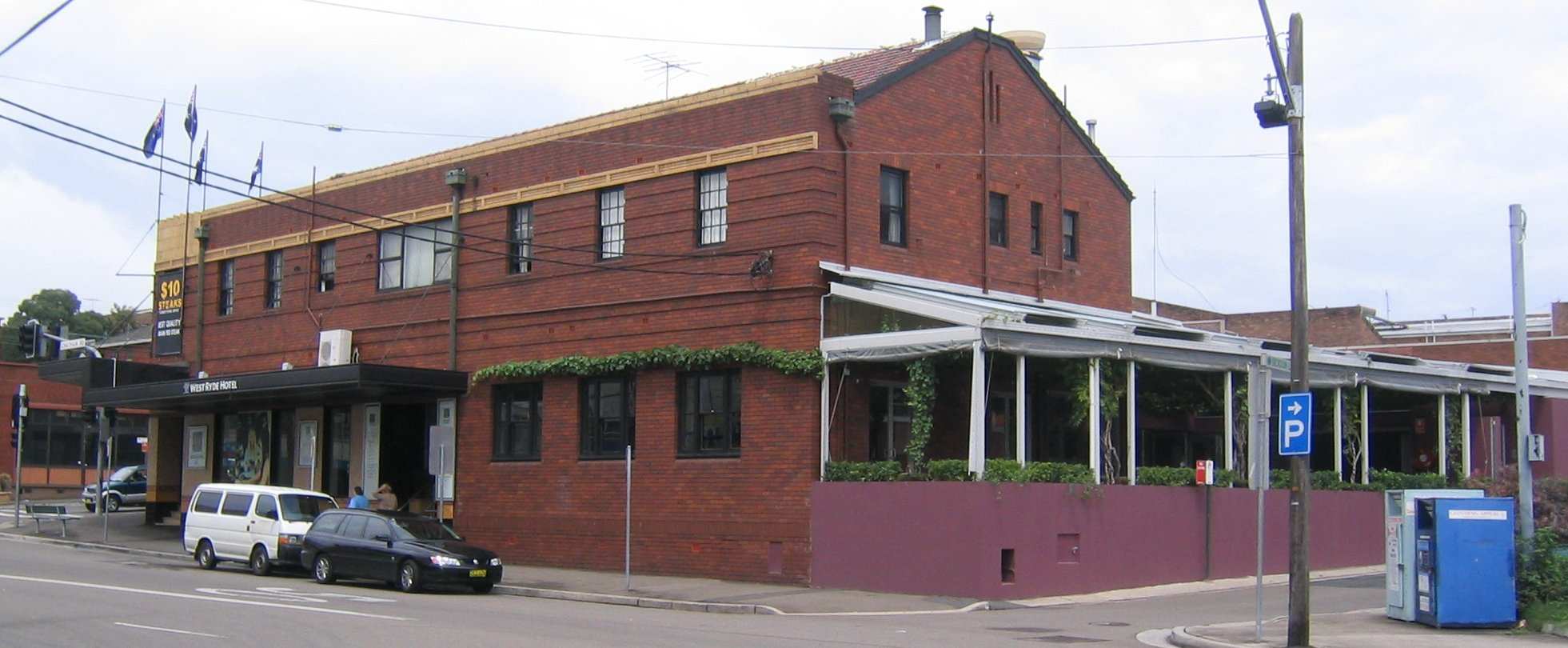
The West Ryde hotel

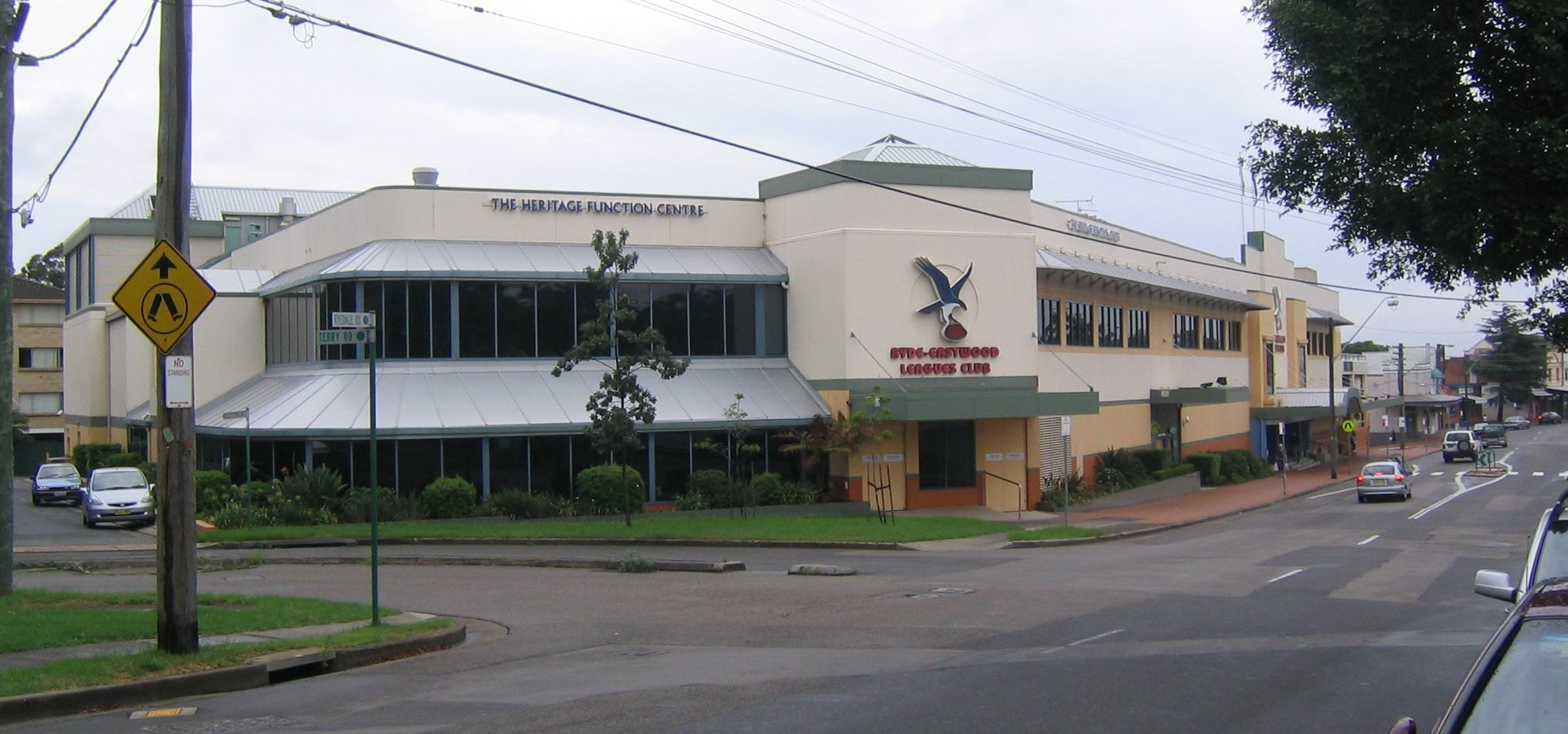
Ryde Eastwood leagues club

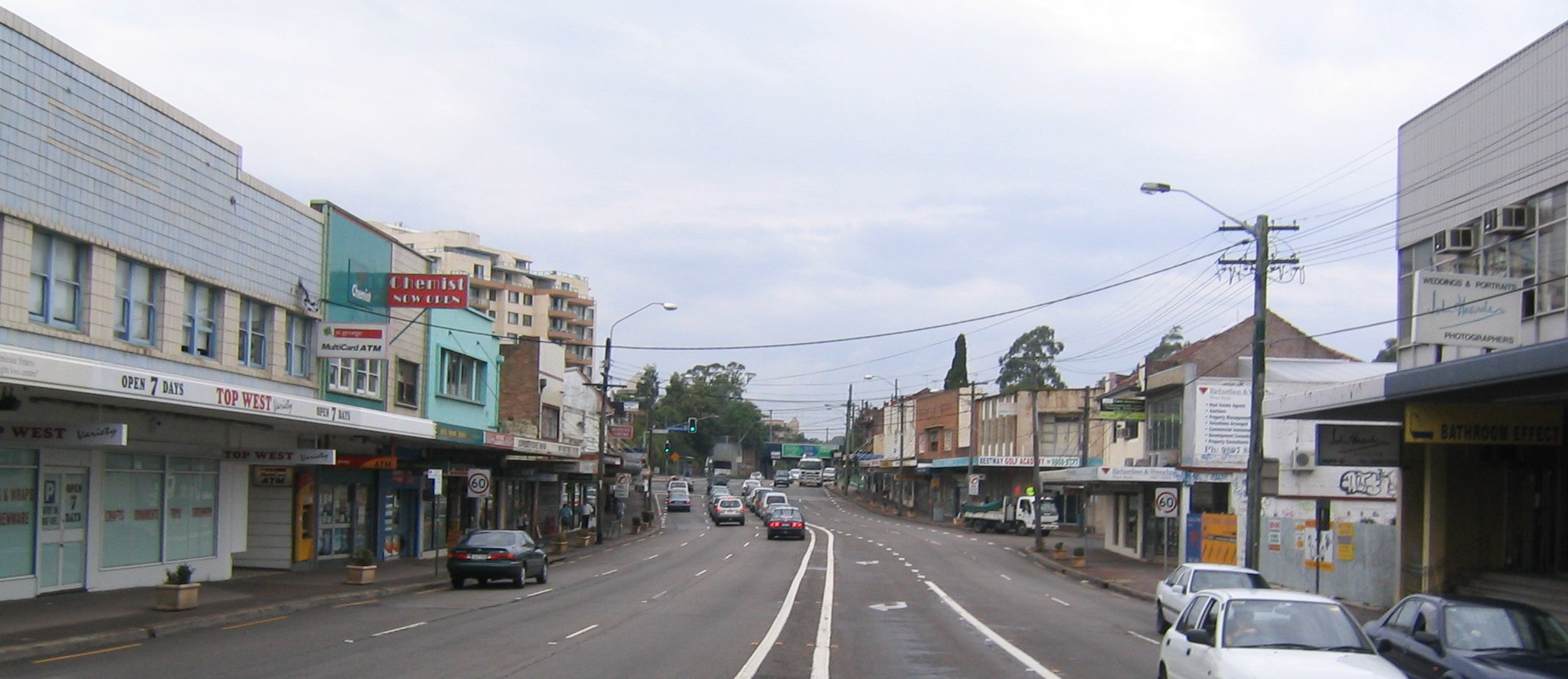
Victoria Road shops

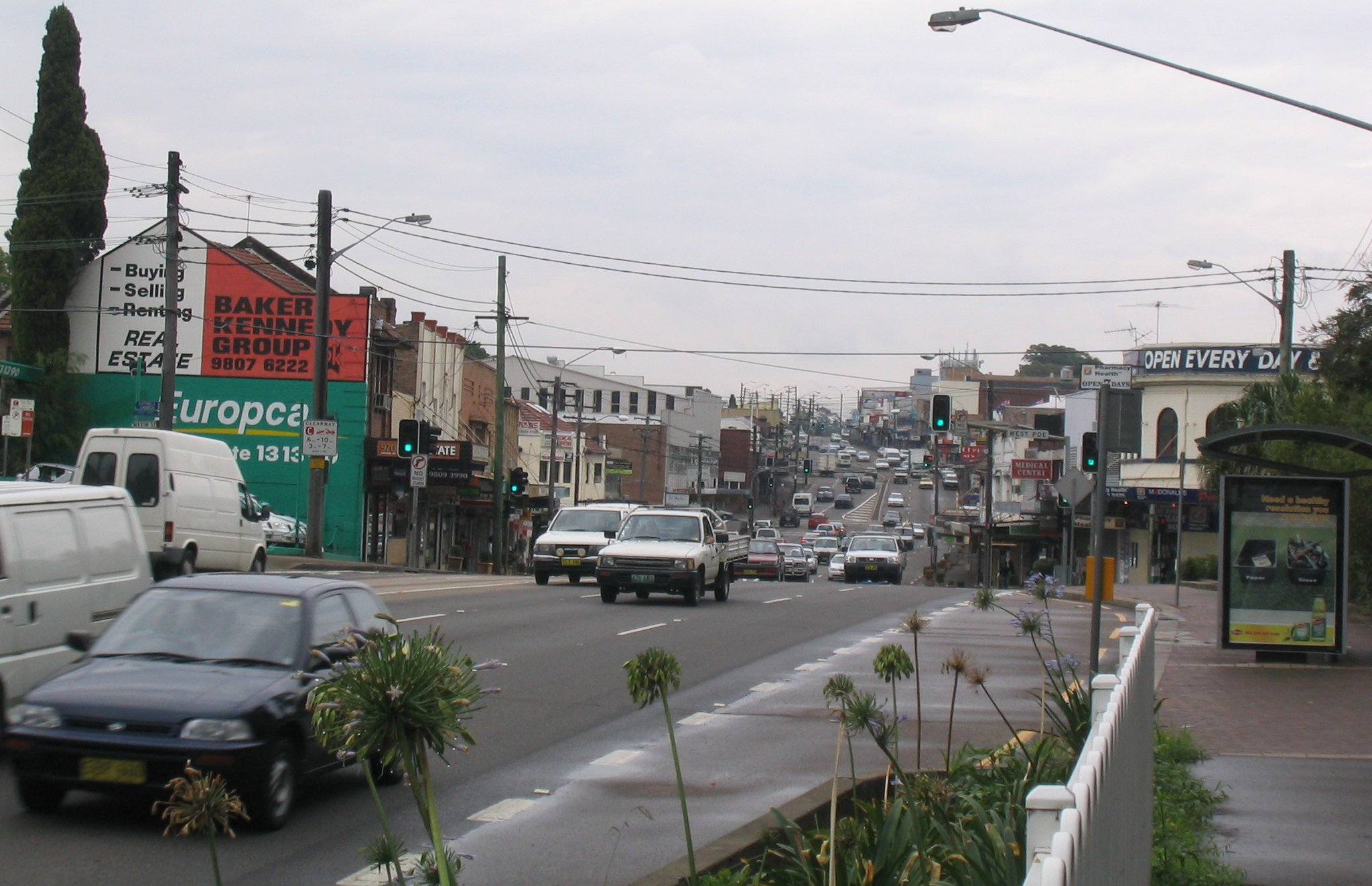
Victoria Road

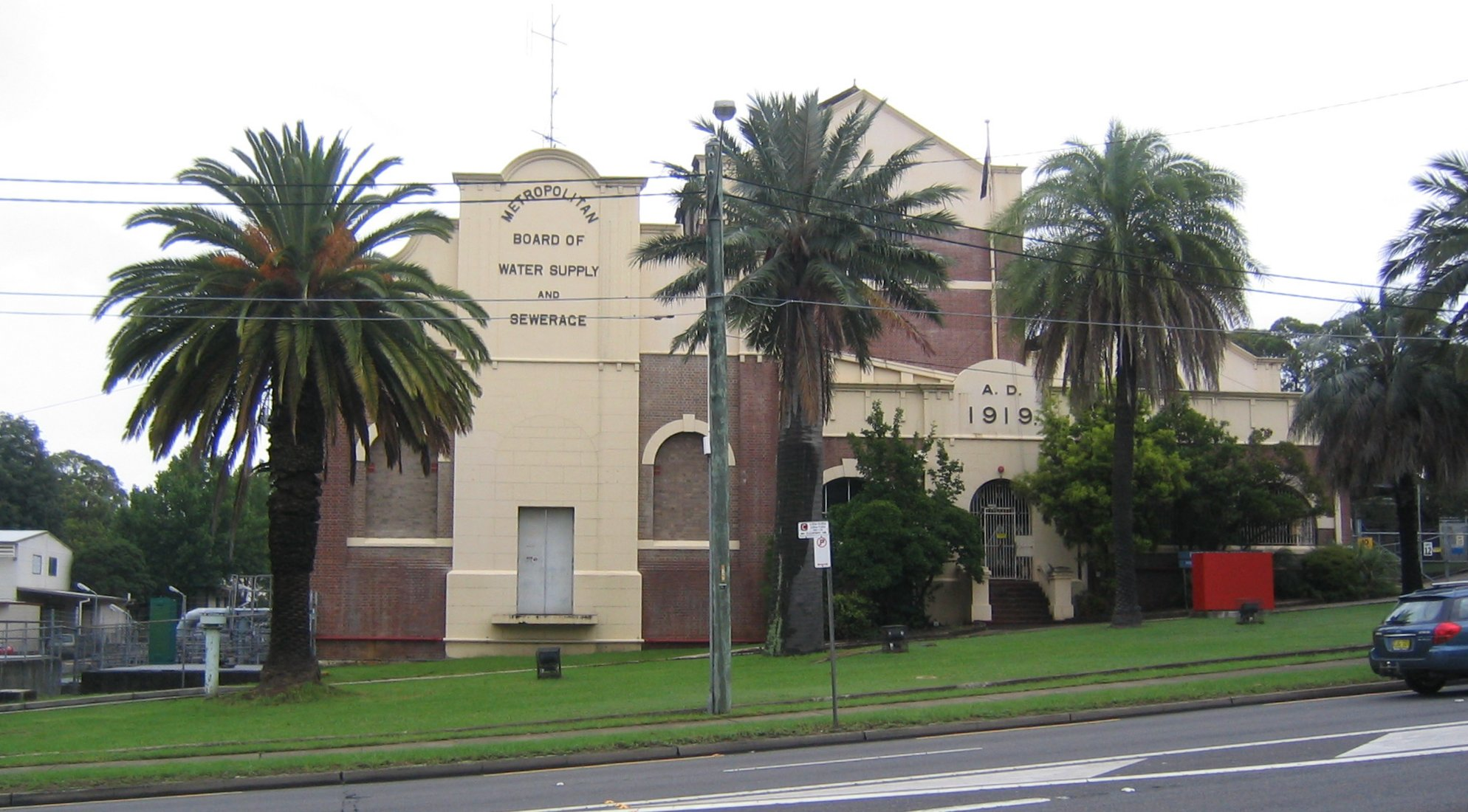
West Ryde pumping station

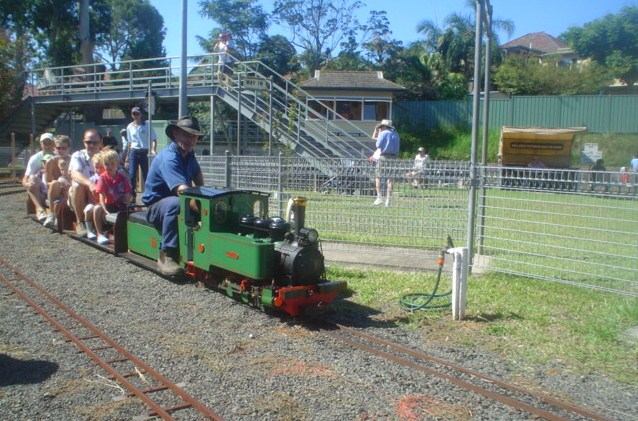
Miniature railway ride at West Ryde in 2007
