= Denistone =

- Suburb
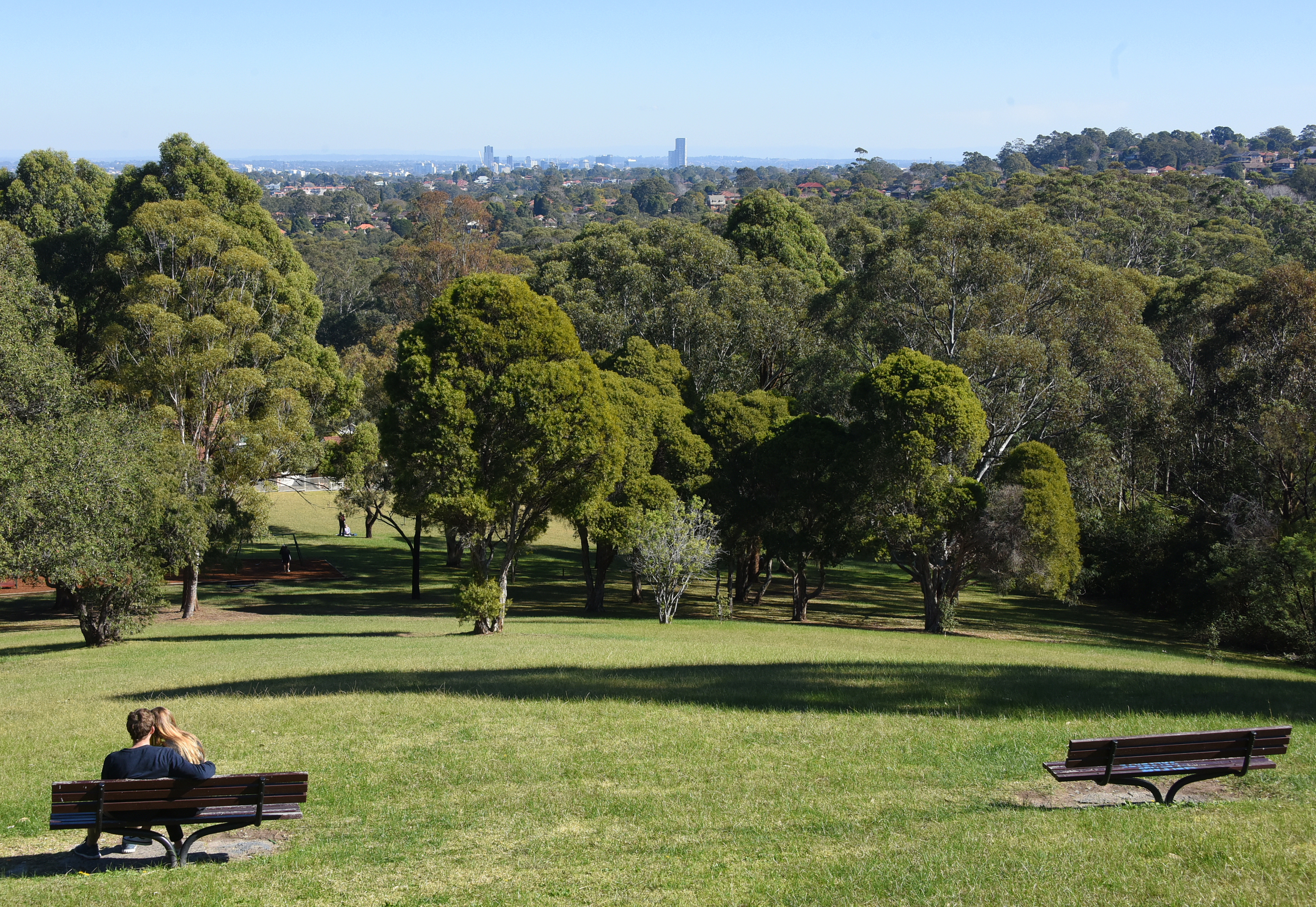
- Denistone Park

- Interactive map of Denistone
- Coordinates: 33°48′03″S 151°05′11″E
- Country: Australia
- State: New South Wales
- Region: Northern Sydney
- City: Sydney
- LGA: City of Ryde
- Location: 16 km (9.9 mi) north-west of Sydney CBD

Government
  - State electorate: Ryde
  - Federal division: Bennelong
- Elevation: 50 m (160 ft)

Population
  - Total: 3,726 (2021 census)
- Postcode: 2114
Suburbs around Denistone
Eastwood	Eastwood	Eastwood
Denistone West	Denistone	Denistone East
West Ryde	West Ryde	West Ryde

Denistone is a suburb in Northern Sydney, in the state of New South Wales, Australia. Denistone is located 16 kilometres north-west of the Sydney central business district in the local government area of the City of Ryde. Denistone West and Denistone East are separate suburbs.

== History ==
The name of the suburb is derived from the name of a house built in the area by early European settlers Thomas and Elizabeth Forster.

The Wallumedegal Aboriginal people lived in the area between the Lane Cove River and Parramatta River, which they knew as Walumetta. Gregory Blaxland, a free settler, purchased the 182.1-hectare (450-acre) Brush Farm estate in 1806, shortly after his arrival in the colony. This estate covered most of the area south from Terry Road to Victoria Road and Tramway Street, and east from Brush Road to Shaftsbury Road.

In 1829, Blaxland transferred Brush Farm Estate to his eldest daughter, Elizabeth, and her husband Dr Thomas Forster. Forster expanded the estate by purchasing the Porteous Mount grants of 48.6 hectares (120 acres) on the Denistone ridge in 1830. Denistone was named after Forster's home "Dennistone", burnt down by bushfires in 1855.

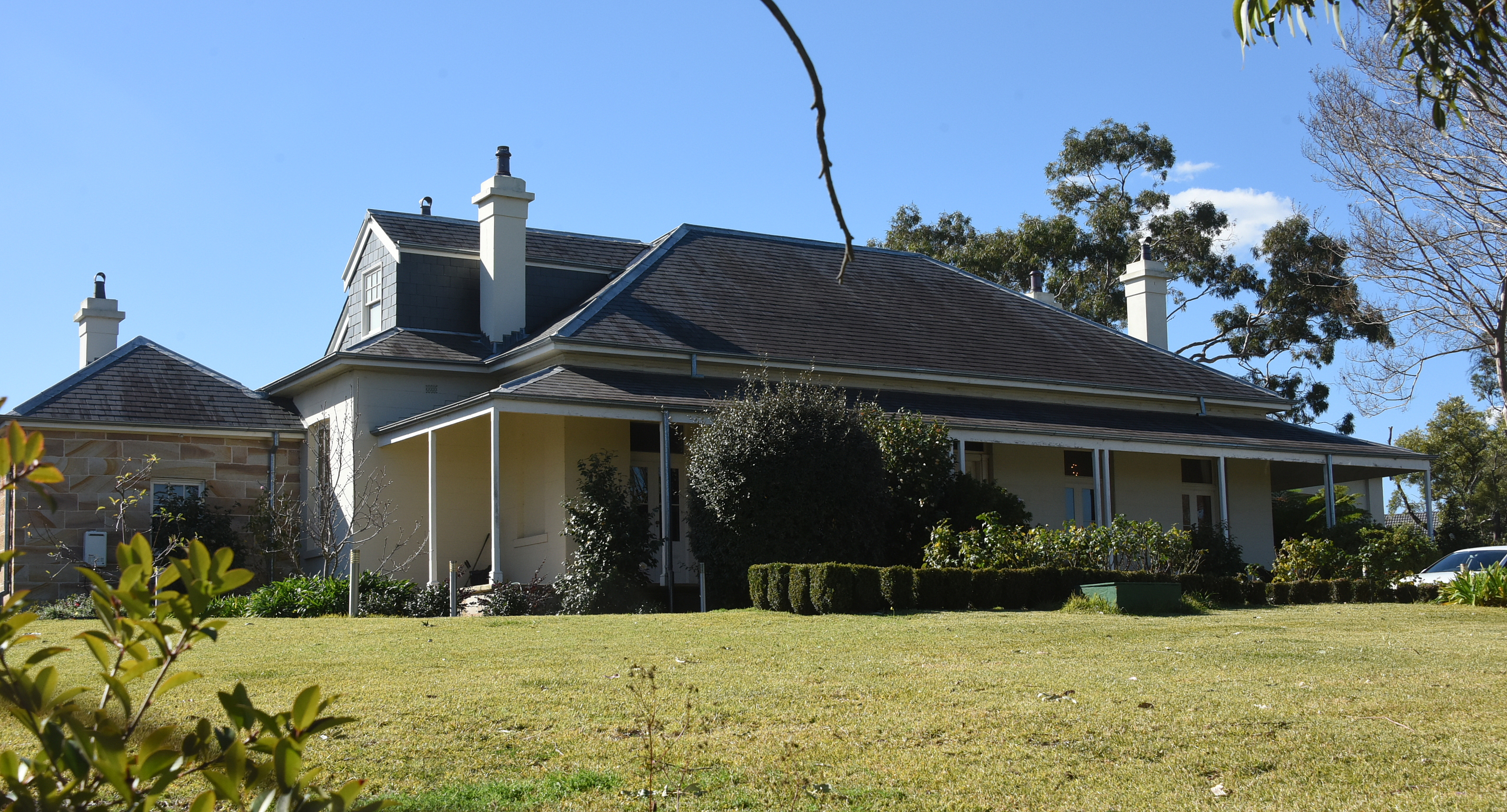
The Hermitage

Richard Rouse Terry acquired the land from the Blaxlands in 1872 and rebuilt Denistone House, which is now within the grounds of Ryde Hospital. The Denistone estate, centred on Denistone House, was a late subdivision, not opened up for sale until 1913. Another historic house in Denistone is The Hermitage which was built by Gregory Blaxland's son, John Blaxland in about 1842.

== Heritage listing ==
1–13 Pennant Avenue, The Hermitage is heritage-listed.

== Transport ==
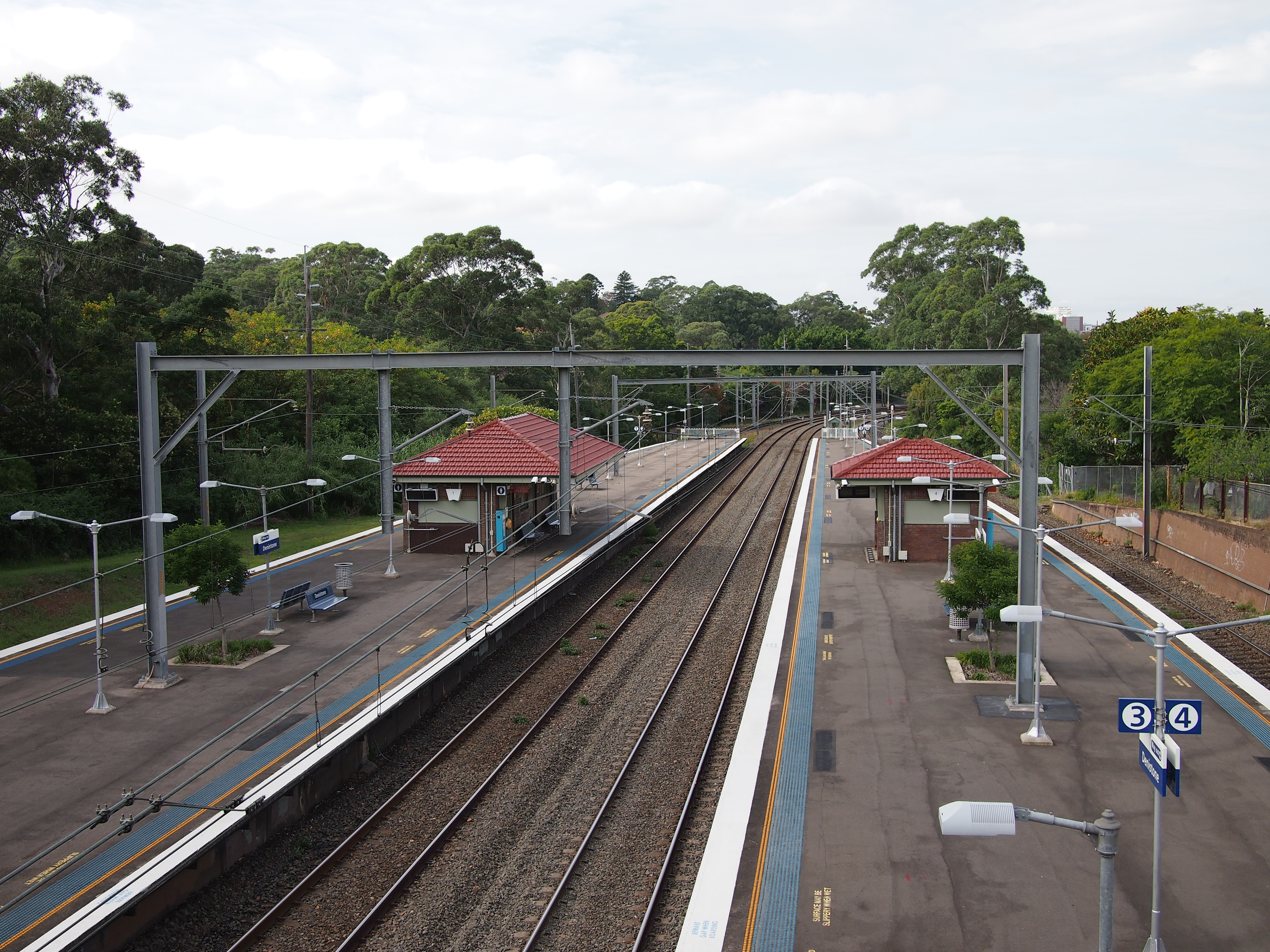
Denistone station

Denistone railway station is on the Main Northern railway line of the Sydney Trains network. Denistone is predominantly residential, lacking a commercial hub, and the station, which was opened in 1937, is considered to be the centre of the suburb..

Busways operates route 515 from Ryde to Eastwood via Denistone.

== Politics ==
Denistone sits in the state electorate of Ryde whose member is Jordan Lane, and the Federal electorate of Bennelong whose member is Jerome Laxale.

== Parks ==
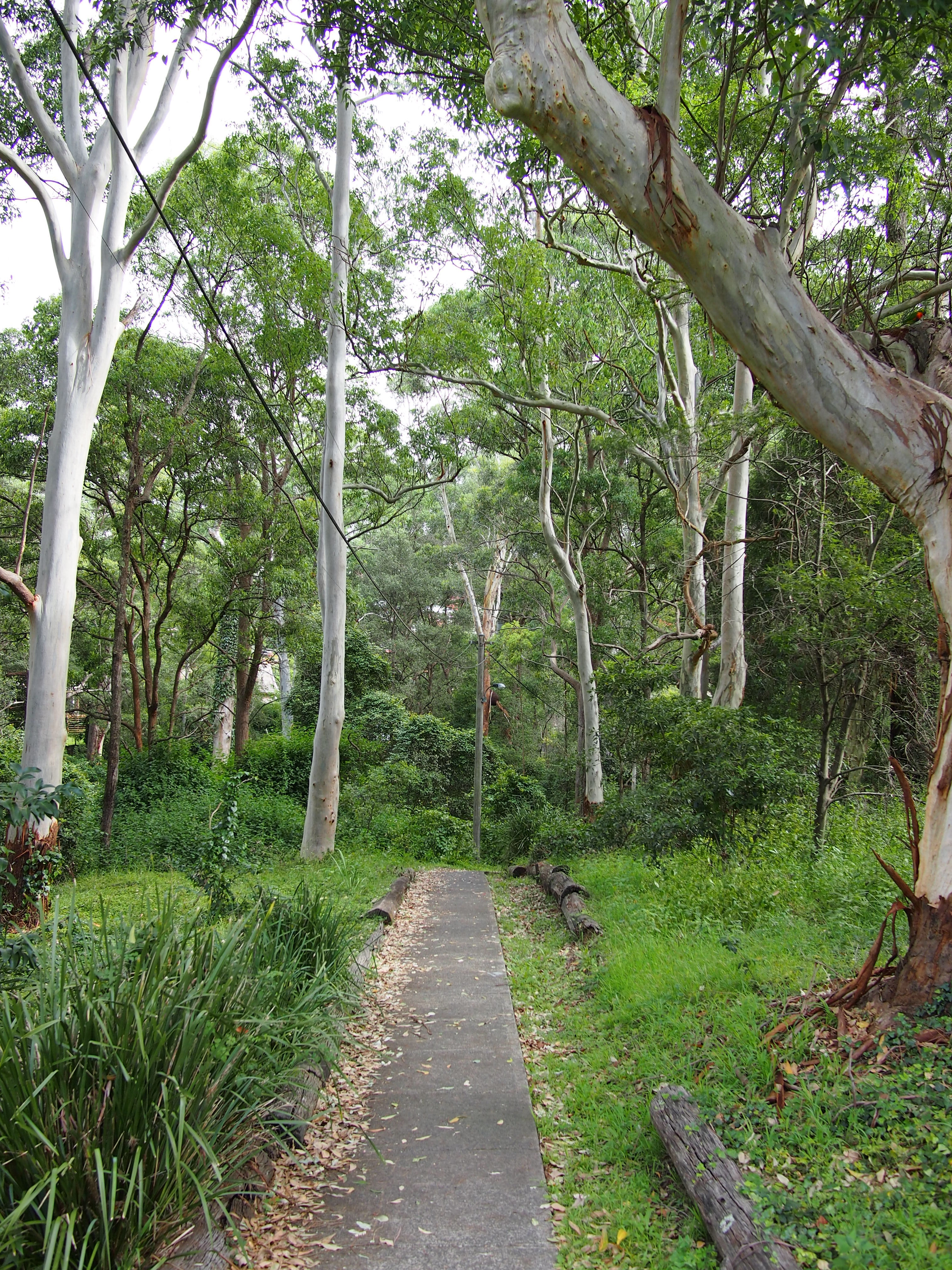
A walkway leading into Darvall Park

Darvall Park is a forest reserve near the railway line at Denistone. Flora includes Sydney blue gum, red olive berry, orange bark, waddy wood and forest nightshade. Despite over thirty years of bush regeneration, large areas of Darvall Park are heavily infested with weeds. Privet, Chinese privet, lantana, Madeira vine, taro and trad. The ringtail possum, Australian king parrot and satin bowerbird are sometimes seen here.

== Demographics ==
=== Population ===
At the 2021 census, there were 3,726 residents in Denistone. 56.6% of people were born in Australia. The next most common countries of birth were China 14.1% and South Korea 3.8%. 55.3% of people spoke only English at home. Other languages spoken at home included Mandarin 15.4%, Cantonese 8.7% and Korean 4.7%. The most common responses for religion in were No Religion 39.7%, Catholic 23.7%, Anglican 9.1% and 3.8% of Densitone's residents were practising Buddhism. Of occupied private dwellings, 79.6% were separate houses and 19.1% were semi-detached.

=== Income ===
At the 2021 Census Densitone's median weekly household income was recorded at $2,683.

== Notable people ==
Arthur Beetson, renowned as one of the greatest Australian Rugby league players of all time used to live in Denistone.
