= Denistone East =

- Suburb
- Interactive map of Denistone East
- Coordinates: 33°47′56″S 151°05′58″E
- Country: Australia
- State: New South Wales
- City: Sydney
- LGA: City of Ryde
- Location: 16 km (9.9 mi) north west of Sydney CBD
- Established: 5 February 1999

Government
  - State electorate: Ryde
  - Federal division: Bennelong
- Elevation: 80 m (260 ft)

Population
  - Total: 2,292 (SAL 2021)
- Postcode: 2112
Suburbs around Denistone East
Eastwood	Eastwood	Eastwood
Denistone	Denistone East	Ryde
West Ryde	West Ryde	West Ryde

Denistone East is a suburb in Northern Sydney, Australia. Denistone East is 16 kilometres north-west of the Sydney central business district in the local government area of the City of Ryde. Denistone and Denistone West are separate suburbs; Denistone East was gazetted as a suburb in its own right on 5 February 1999.

== Population ==
In the 2021 census, there were 2,292 people in Denistone East. 54.1% of people were born in Australia; the next most common countries of birth were China (excluding Special Administrative Regions and Taiwan) 18.7%, South Korea 4.7%, Hong Kong (Special administrative region of China) 2.5%, India 2.1% and England 1.9%. 46.2% of people spoke only English at home. Other languages spoken at home included Mandarin 21.9%, Cantonese 9.0%, Korean 3.7%, Italian 3.1% and Tamil 1.7%. The most common responses for religion were No Religion 40.4%, Catholic 24.8%, Anglican 6.8 and Buddhism 4.4% - 4.3% of people elected not to disclose their religious status.

== Commercial area ==
Denistone East does not have its own retail area. The closest shopping precinct is Midway Shopping Centre, which lies just outside Denistone East's northeast boundary in the suburb of Ryde.

Larger regional shopping centres such as Macquarie Centre and Top Ryde City are located nearby.

== Schools ==
Denistone East Public School was established in 1950, and is a large local primary school with over 800 students from Kindergarten to Grade 6. It was rebuilt in 2005 with completely new administrative, assembly and classroom blocks. Back in 2019 with the help of government funding they got rid of the demountables and build new classrooms for stage 3.

== Transport ==
At present the following routes service Denistone East. All are provided by Busways:

- Route 286: Milsons Point via North Ryde, Lane Cove and North Sydney (morning and evening peak hour service) [This service formerly ran to QVB, however the route was changed in October 2015 due to George St road closure for the construction of the light rail]
- Route 297: Wynyard via North Ryde and Lane Cove Tunnel (morning and evening peak hour service) [This service formerly ran to QVB, however the route was changed in October 2015 due to George St road closure for the construction of the light rail]
- Route 515: Eastwood (via Denistone East/Blaxland Road) to Top Ryde via Ryde Hospital
- Route 518: Meadowbank ferry wharf to Macquarie University via Top Ryde
- Route 544: Auburn to Macquarie Centre via Eastwood and Ermington (Mon-Sat Service)
