= Denistone railway station =

Railway station in Sydney, New South Wales, Australia

Denistone
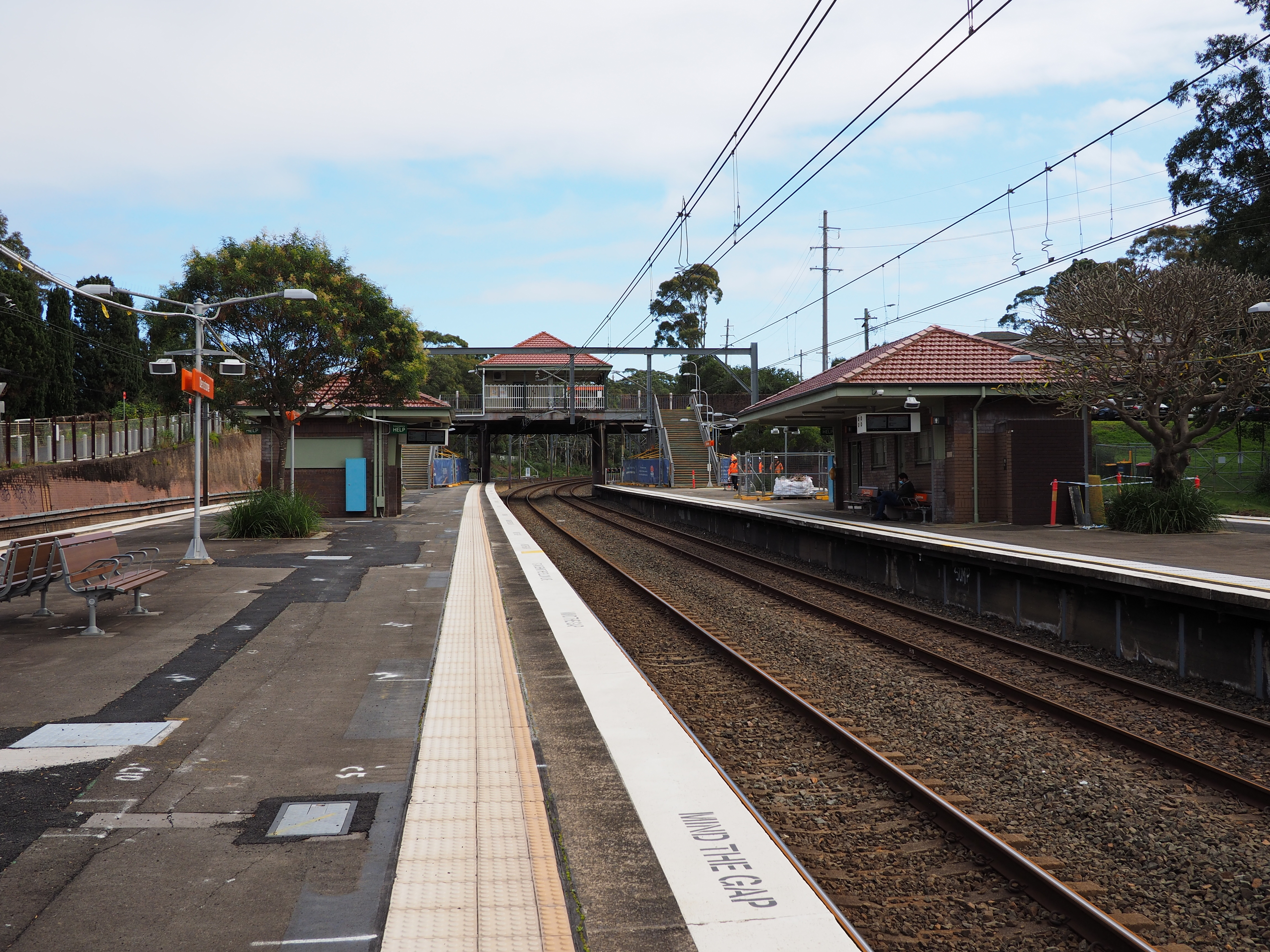
- Denistone station in 2022

General information
- Location: West Parade, Denistone; Sydney, New South Wales; Australia
- Coordinates: 33°47′59″S 151°05′15″E
- Elevation: 48 metres (157 ft)
- Owner: Transport Asset Manager of NSW
- Operator: Sydney Trains
- Line: Main North
- Distance: 20.16 km (12.53 mi) from Central
- Platforms: 4 (2 island)
- Tracks: 4

Construction
- Structure type: Ground
- Accessible: Yes

Other information
- Status: Weekdays: Staffed: 6am to 2pm: Weekends and public holidays: Unstaffed
- Station code: DST
- Website: Transport for NSW

History
- Opened: 26 September 1937 (88 years ago)
- Electrified: Yes (from 1926)

Passengers
- 2025: 276,319 (year); 757 (daily) (Sydney Trains)
- Rank: 179

Services
Preceding station	Sydney Trains	Following station
Eastwood towards Hornsby	Northern Line	West Ryde towards Gordon via Central
Location

Denistone railway station is a suburban railway station located on the Main North line, serving the Sydney suburb of Denistone. It is served by Sydney Trains T9 Northern Line services.

== History ==
Denistone station opened on 26 September 1937 with two side platforms. However, they were built with provision to be converted to island platforms at a later date. The western platform was converted on 24 October 1978, and the eastern platform on 27 November 1989 when extra lines were opened.

It contains one of Sydney's smaller commuter car-parks. The station is located on a steep 1 in 40 gradient.

The station was earmarked for closure in 2001 due to low patronage but the plan was strongly opposed by the community who eventually won their appeal for it to stay open.

In early 2019 planning for an upgrade to the station commenced with the project set to be completed in 2023.

This upgrade involves two new lifts being built, one for each island platform. The upgrades were completed in September 2023.

== Services ==
=== Platforms ===
Platform	Line	Stopping pattern	Notes
1	T9	Southbound services to Gordon via Strathfield & North Sydney	
2	T9	Southbound services to Gordon via Strathfield & North Sydney	
3	T9	Northbound services to Hornsby	
4	T9	Northbound services to Hornsby	
