= Eastwood railway station =

Railway station in Sydney, New South Wales, Australia

Eastwood
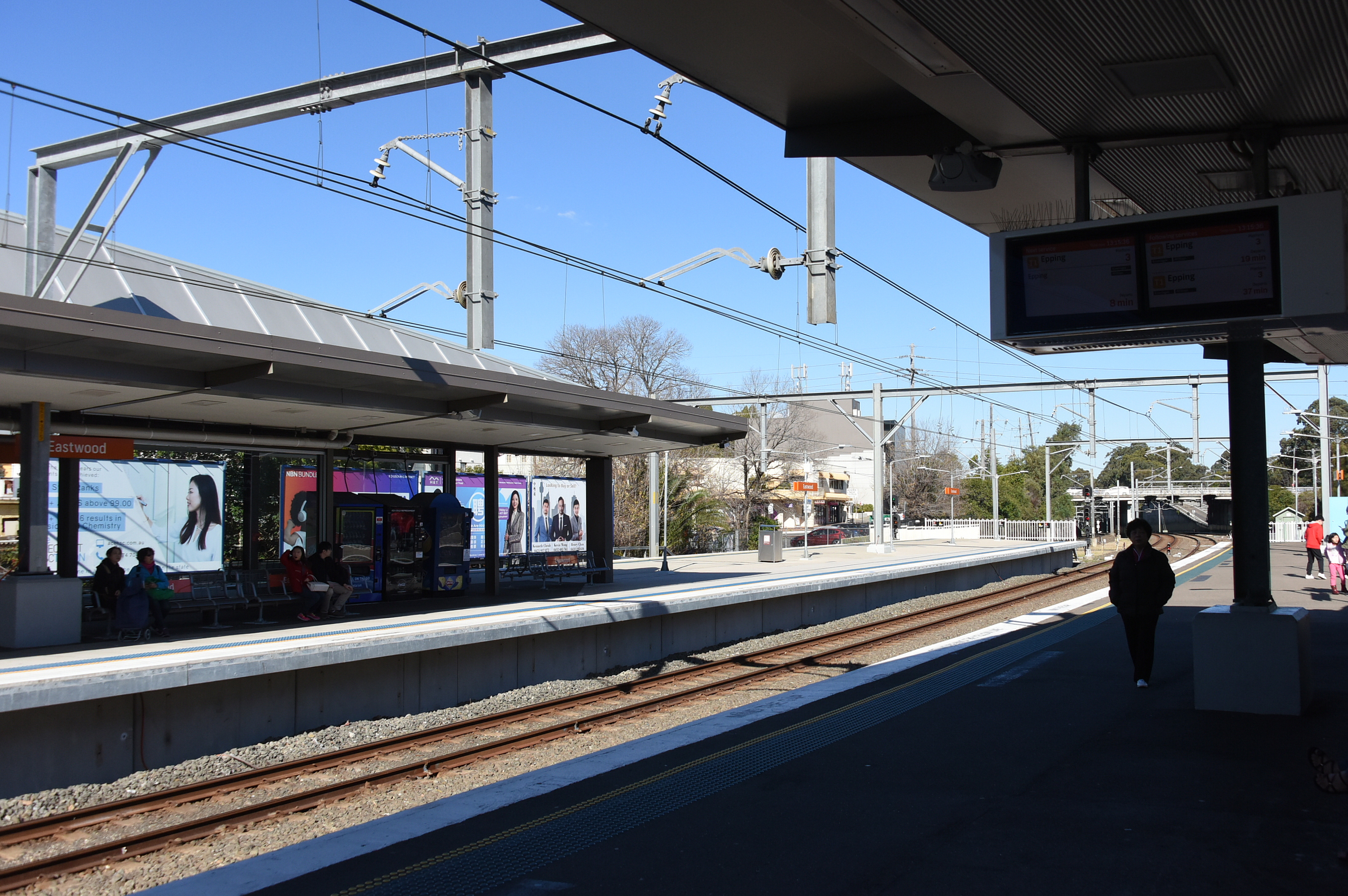
- Northbound view from Platform 3 in July 2018

General information
- Location: West Parade, Eastwood; Sydney, New South Wales; Australia
- Coordinates: 33°47′25″S 151°04′56″E
- Elevation: 69 metres (226 ft)
- Owner: Transport Asset Manager of NSW
- Operator: Sydney Trains
- Line: Main North
- Distance: 21.39 km (13.29 mi) from Central
- Platforms: 4 (2 island)
- Tracks: 4
- Connections: Bus

Construction
- Structure type: Ground
- Accessible: Yes

Other information
- Status: Weekdays: Staffed: 6am–10pm: Weekends and public holidays: Staffed: 6am–10pm
- Station code: EWD
- Website: Transport for NSW

History
- Opened: 17 October 1886 (140 years ago)
- Electrified: Yes (from 1926)
- Former names: Dundas (1886–1887)

Passengers
- 2025: 3,912,085 (year); 10,718 (daily) (Sydney Trains)
- Rank: 46

Services
| Preceding station | Sydney Trains | Following station |
|---|---|---|
| Epping towards Hornsby | T9 Northern Line | Denistone towards Gordon via Central |
Location

Eastwood railway station is a suburban railway station located on the Main North line, serving the Sydney suburb of Eastwood. It is served by Sydney Trains T9 Northern Line services.

== History ==
The station opened as Dundas on 17 September 1886 on the single track line. It was renamed Eastwood on 1 September 1887. The line through Eastwood was subsequently duplicated and has since been quadruplicated. In 2004, the platforms were extended towards Epping to allow 8-car V sets to service the platforms.

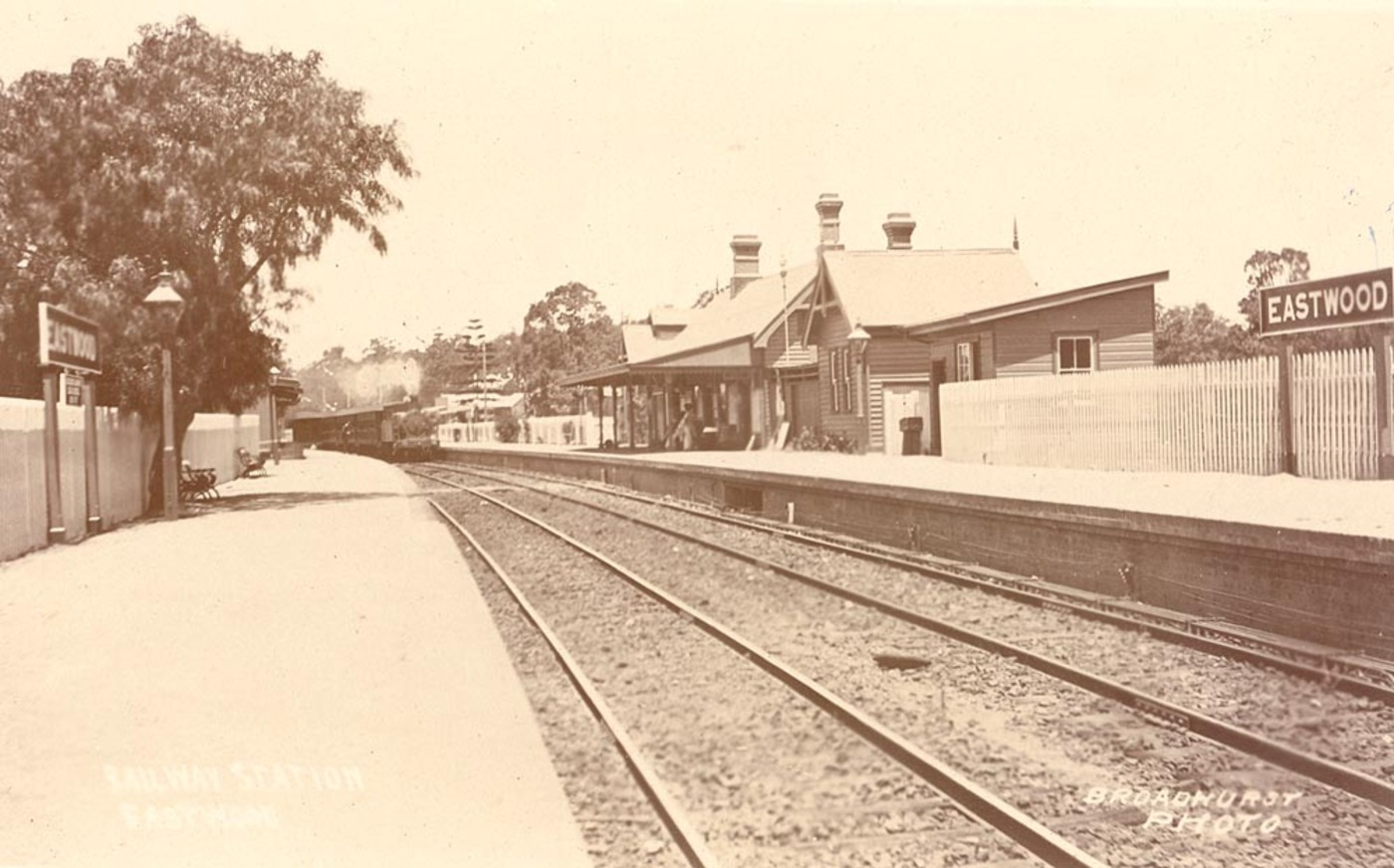
Eastwood station in the early 20th century

The station subway is accessible by non-paying members of the public, although this was separated from the station concourse by a fence. In February 2007, the fence was removed to allow construction of smartcard readers for the Tcard system.

In March 2006 it was revealed, that asbestos fibre had been disturbed by contractors installing cabling for the Tcard project in the roof of the ticketing office at the station. The station offices were temporarily closed and replaced by a temporary booking office in the station carpark.

In June 2008, an upgrade to the station including lifts was complete.

Intercity Central Coast & Newcastle Line trains previously also served the station until the 30 September 2018 timetable change, when the service was altered to no longer stop here.

== Services ==
=== Platforms ===
| Platform | Line | Stopping pattern | Notes |
| 1 | T9 Northern Line | Southbound services to Gordon via Strathfield & North Sydney; 8 weekday morning peak and 8 weekday afternoon peak services to Central | |
| 2 | T9 Northern Line | Southbound services to Gordon via Strathfield & North Sydney | |
| 3 | T9 Northern Line | Northbound services to Hornsby | |
| 4 | T9 Northern Line | Northbound and weekday evening peak services to Hornsby | |

=== Transport links ===
Busways operates seven different bus routes via Eastwood station, under contract to Transport for NSW:

Stand A

- 515: to Ryde
- 544: to Macquarie Centre
- 544: to Auburn
- 545: to North Ryde via Macquarie Centre
- 545: to Parramatta Station via Telopea

Stand B

- 521: to Parramatta Station via Park Rd
- 541: to Epping Station

Stand C

- 545: to North Ryde via Macquarie Centre
- N80: to Hornsby Station
- Rail Replacement Services to Hornsby Station

Stand D

- 545: to Parramatta Station via Telopea
- N80: to City Town Hall

Stand E

- 551: to Marsfield via Vimiera Rd
- Rail Replacement Services to Strathfield Station

== Trackplan ==
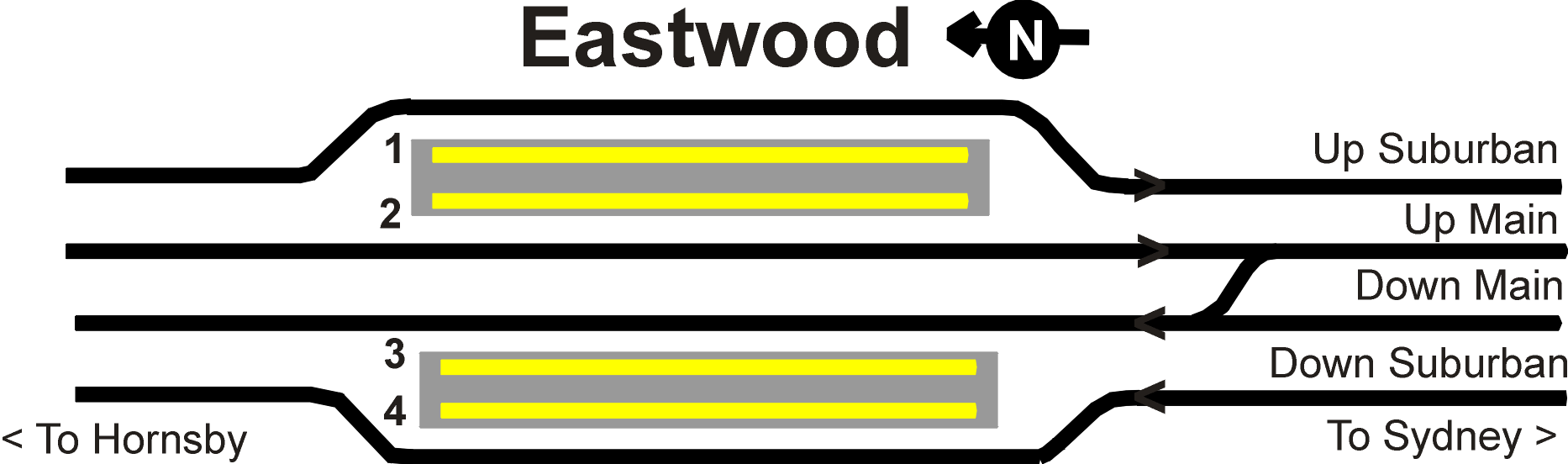
Track layout
