= McMahons Point =

- Suburb
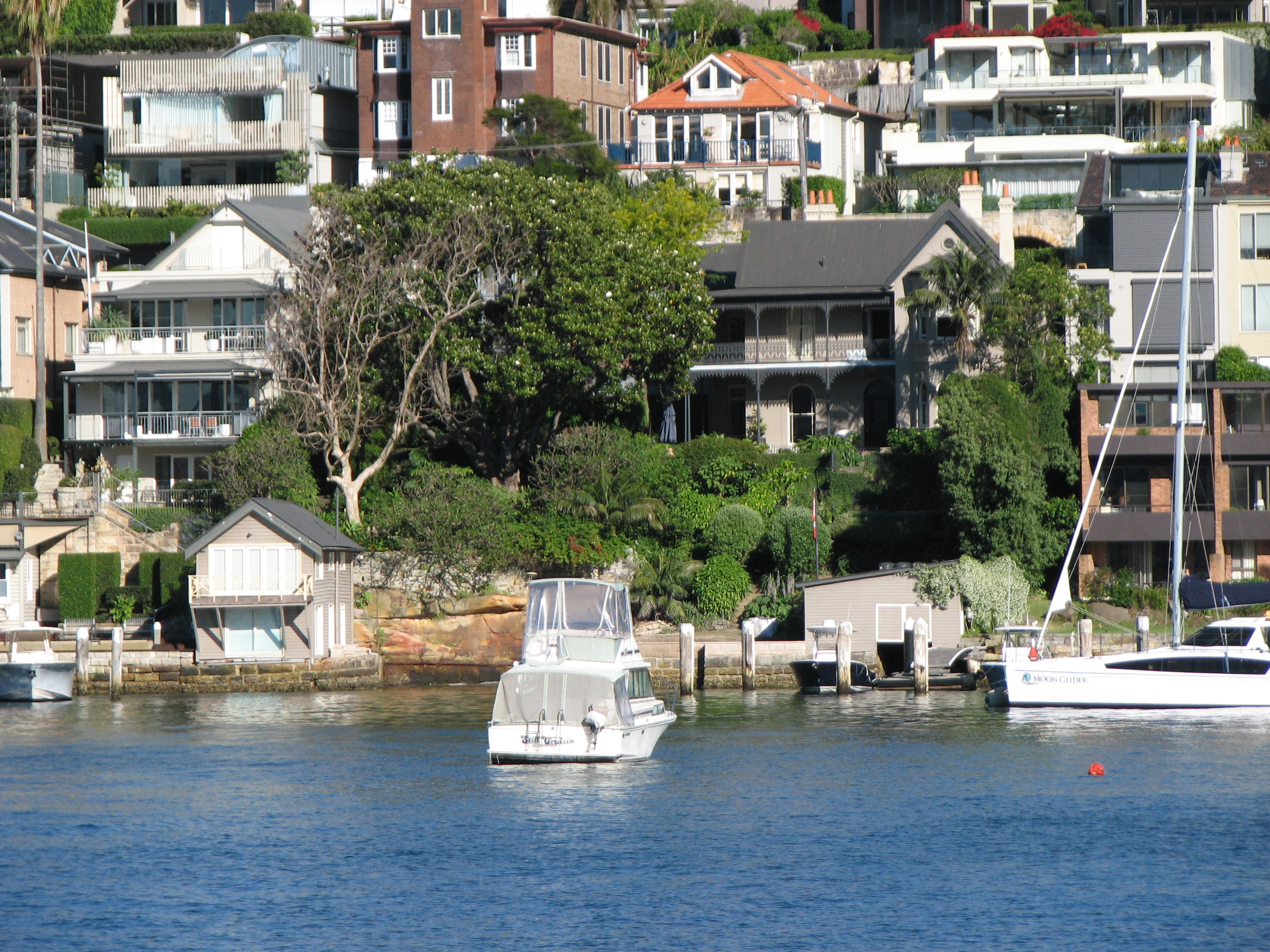
- McMahons Point, New South Wales

- Interactive map of McMahons Point
- Country: Australia
- State: New South Wales
- City: Sydney
- LGA: North Sydney Council
- Location: 3 km (1.9 mi) N of Sydney CBD

Government
  - State electorate: North Shore
  - Federal division: Warringah

Area
  - Total: 0.3 km^{2} (0.12 sq mi)
- Elevation: 41 m (135 ft)

Population
  - Total: 2,315 (SAL 2021)
- Postcode: 2060
Suburbs around McMahons Point
Waverton	North Sydney	Lavender Bay
Greenwich	McMahons Point	Milsons Point
Goat Island	Millers Point	Dawes Point

McMahons Point is a harbourside suburb on the lower North Shore of Sydney, New South Wales, Australia. McMahons Point is located 3 kilometres (1.9 mi) north of the Sydney central business district, in the local government area of North Sydney Council. McMahons Point sits on the peninsula flanked by Berrys Bay to the west and Lavender Bay to the east. The lower tip of the peninsula is known as Blues Point, which offers expansive views of Port Jackson.

Once predominantly working-class, it is now among Sydney's most exclusive localities. McMahons Point is primarily a medium-to-high-density residential area and is bordered by the surrounding suburbs of Waverton, North Sydney and Lavender Bay. Real estate north of Sydney Harbour in this collection of villages is set at a premium due to the area's low crime rate, cafes, restaurants, pubs, parks, accessibility to bus, train and ferry networks plus expansive views of the Sydney City CBD.

== History ==
McMahon's Point is named after Michael McMahon, a 19-year old Irish farm labourer who arrived in Sydney on 14 February 1848 with his brother James (24). Two years later he married Angelina Faning (of St Helier, Jersey, Channel Islands) and they had several children.

Michael McMahon became a successful and wealthy manufacturer of brushes and combs and in 1864 built the McMahon family home on the headland. He became mayor of the borough of Victoria (later North Sydney) in 1890. He and his wife Angelina and many of their family are buried in the Catholic Section of Gore Hill Cemetery. However their many descendants are established in Australia, New Zealand, Canada and the US and the McMahon family name has become part of the famous harbour where he built his home.

The original occupants of this region were the Cammeraygal. These people lived along the foreshores and in bushland, cliffs and rock shelters prior to European settlement.

Land in this area was originally settled and farmed by James Milson, a Napoleonic War veteran, in 1806. Further grants were subsequently made in 1817 to Billy Blue, a Jamaican convict turned Sydney Harbour waterman, which remained within his family until the 1850s. Subsequently, the estate was progressively subdivided, with the earliest developments occurring on the northern end. Blues Point Road had been gazetted from 1839 as a thoroughfare from the ferry wharf to the St Leonards township. Most of the middle and southern sections of the peninsula were subdivided by the 1870s. A tram line was extended to McMahons Point in 1909, further stimulating development, particularly along Blues Point Road.

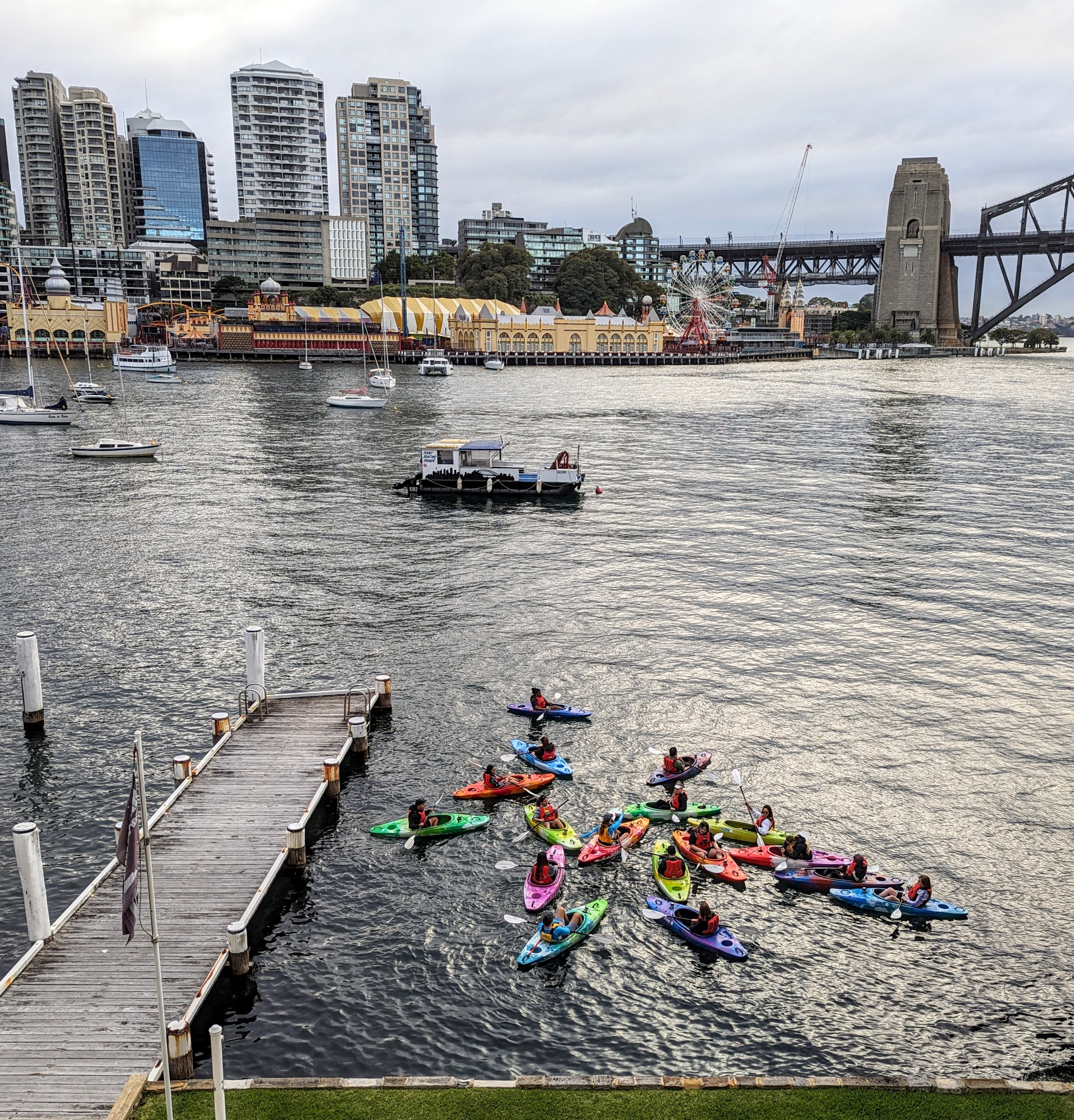
Kayak class on Lavender Bay near the ferry wharf

Large numbers of passenger and vehicular ferries travelled between Blues Point/McMahons Point and the city at the turn of the century. When the Sydney Harbour Bridge opened in 1932, the wharves of McMahons and Blues Point provided services every 10–15 minutes and served six million passengers per year. The opening of the harbour bridge immediately rendered the bulk of these ferries redundant and, in 1935, small ferries operated by Hegarty Ferries took over the former runs of the larger craft of Sydney Ferries Limited to McMahons Point. The tram service was replaced by buses in 1933.

In July 1890, the boroughs of St Leonards, East St Leonards and Victoria (incorporating McMahons Point) merged to form the borough of North Sydney. Foreshores were popular for boat building and other maritime activity through the latter half of the nineteenth century and well into the twentieth. In 1957, much of McMahons Point was to be rezoned as 'waterfront industrial' by North Sydney Council, but a group formed by residents and architects, led by Harry Seidler, argued for a residential vision. Seidler proposed a 29-building apartment development in gardens. This redevelopment was in turn opposed by a new council and residents; only two towers were built - Blues Point Tower and Harbour Master.

A stretch of railway line dating from 1893 runs through the suburb's north-west and emerges from a tunnel at an off-peak storage depot in Lavender Bay. It no longer carries passengers as the North Shore railway line was diverted in 1932 with stations at Milsons Point and North Sydney after the Harbour Bridge opened.

== Heritage listings ==
McMahons Point has a number of heritage-listed sites, including:

- 11-11a Bayview Point: Ildemere

== Population ==
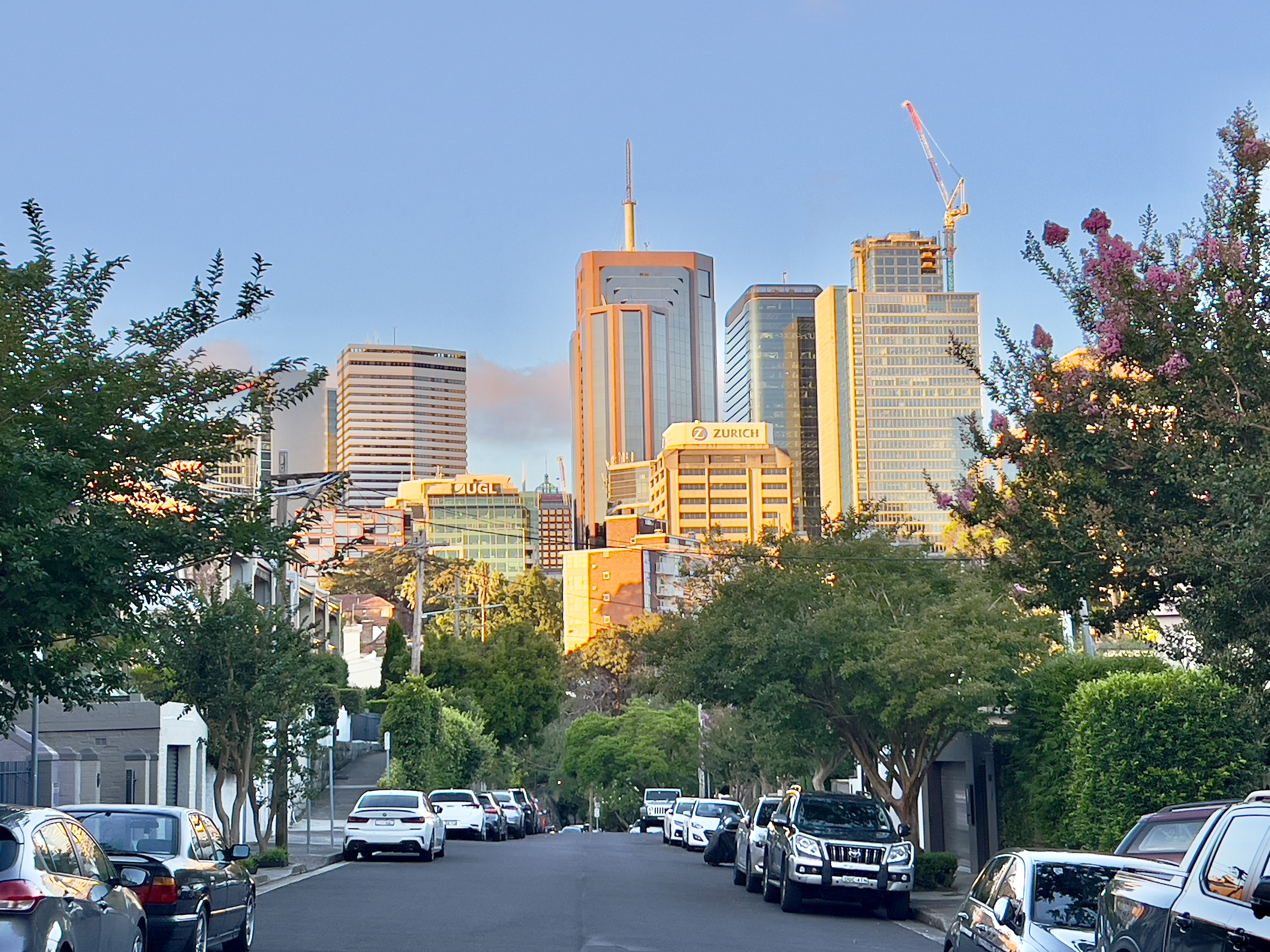
Residential street

In the 2021 Census, there were 2,315 people in McMahons Point. 60.9% of people were born in Australia. The next most common countries of birth were England at 7.7%, New Zealand at 2.7%, United States of America 2.3%, China 2.0% and South Africa 2.0%. 79.6% of people spoke only English at home, the next most common languages spoken at home were Mandarin 2.4%, French 1.6%, Cantonese 1.4%, Spanish 1.1% and Italian 1.0%. The most common responses for religion were No Religion 48.3%, Catholic 19.4% and Anglican 12.7%.

== Commercial area ==
At the northern end of Blues Point Road (adjacent to the North Sydney central business district), there is a concentration of businesses primarily associated with advertising/marketing, publishing, media, computing, engineering, architecture and creative arts. This precinct is also home to many al fresco street cafés and restaurants and some speciality retail stores.

== Transport ==
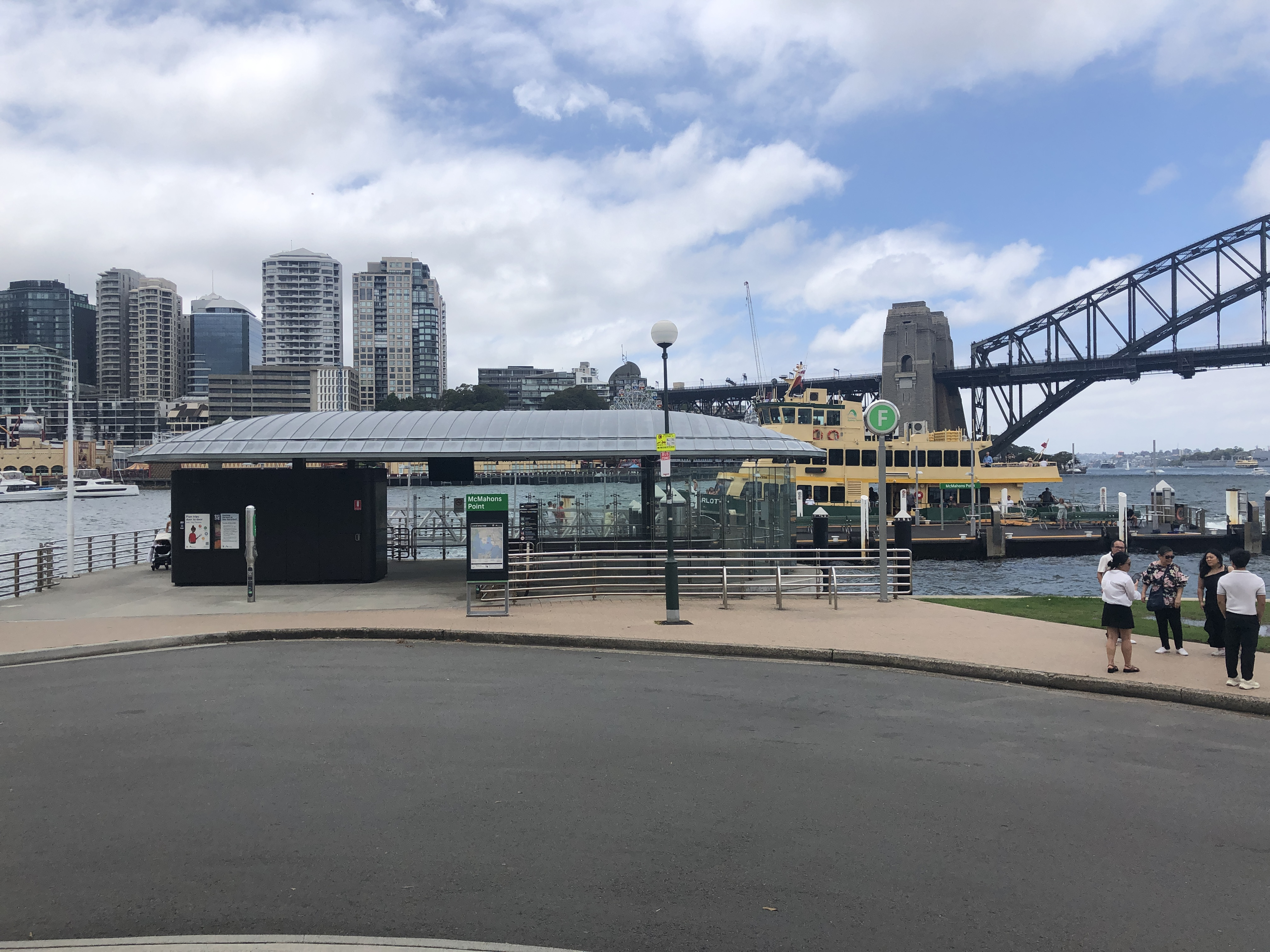
McMahons Point ferry wharf in 2024

The suburb is served by F4 Pyrmont Bay ferry services and F3 Parramatta River ferry services (F3 Peak only), trains (from Waverton, North Sydney and Milsons Point} on the North Shore railway line of the Sydney Trains network, with Busways bus routes 254 and 291 terminating at McMahons Point ferry wharf.
