= Waverton, New South Wales =

Waverton
- Suburb
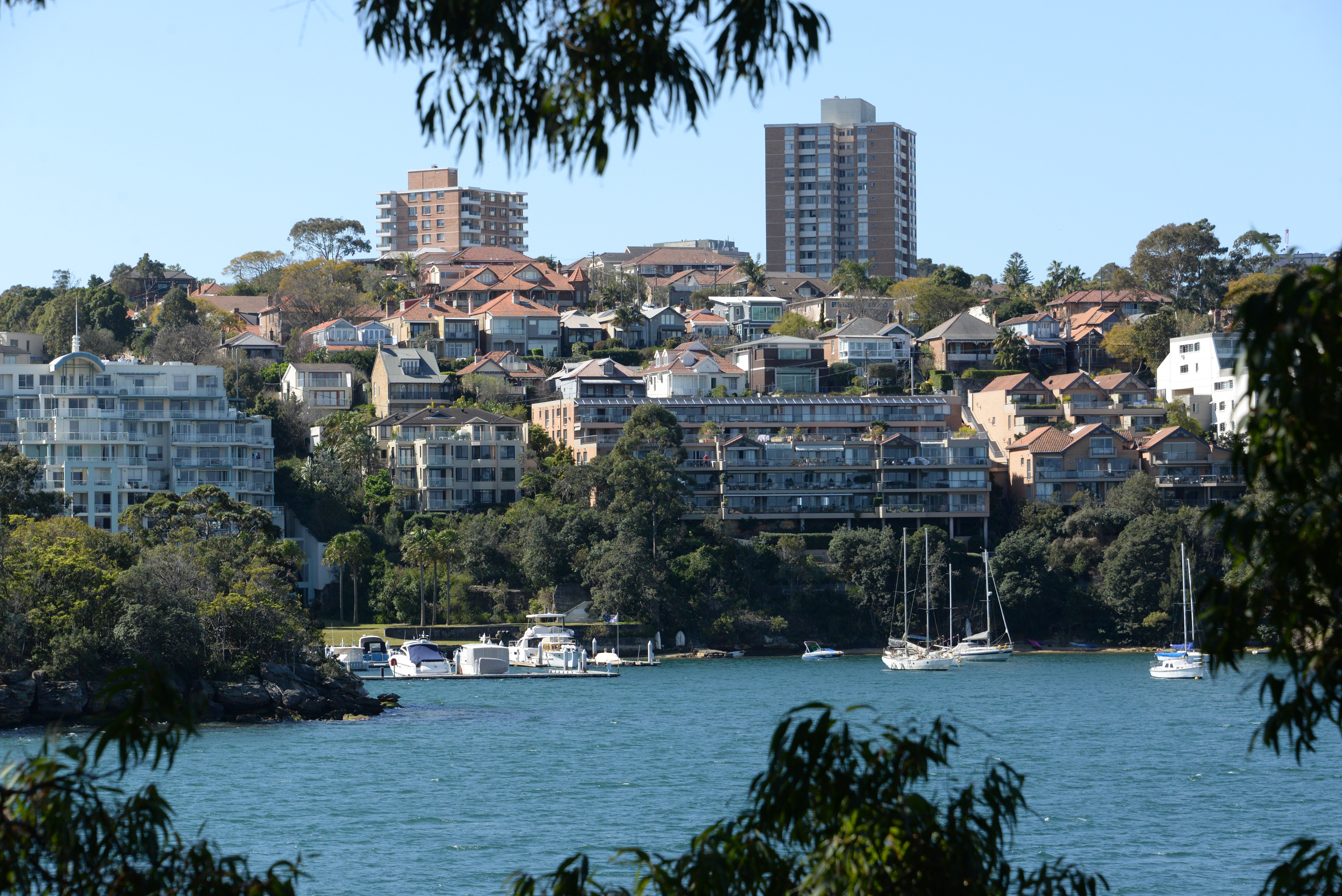
- Waverton, New South Wales

- Interactive map of Waverton
- Country: Australia
- State: New South Wales
- City: Sydney
- LGA: North Sydney Council
- Location: 4 km (2.5 mi) north of Sydney CBD
- Established: 1929

Government
  - State electorate: North Shore
  - Federal division: Warringah

Area
  - Total: 0.8 km^{2} (0.31 sq mi)
- Elevation: 42 m (138 ft)

Population
  - Total: 2,981 (2021 census)
  - Density: 3,730/km^{2} (9,700/sq mi)
- Postcode: 2060
Suburbs around Waverton
Wollstonecraft	Crows Nest	North Sydney
Greenwich	Waverton	North Sydney
Birchgrove	Goat Island	McMahons Point

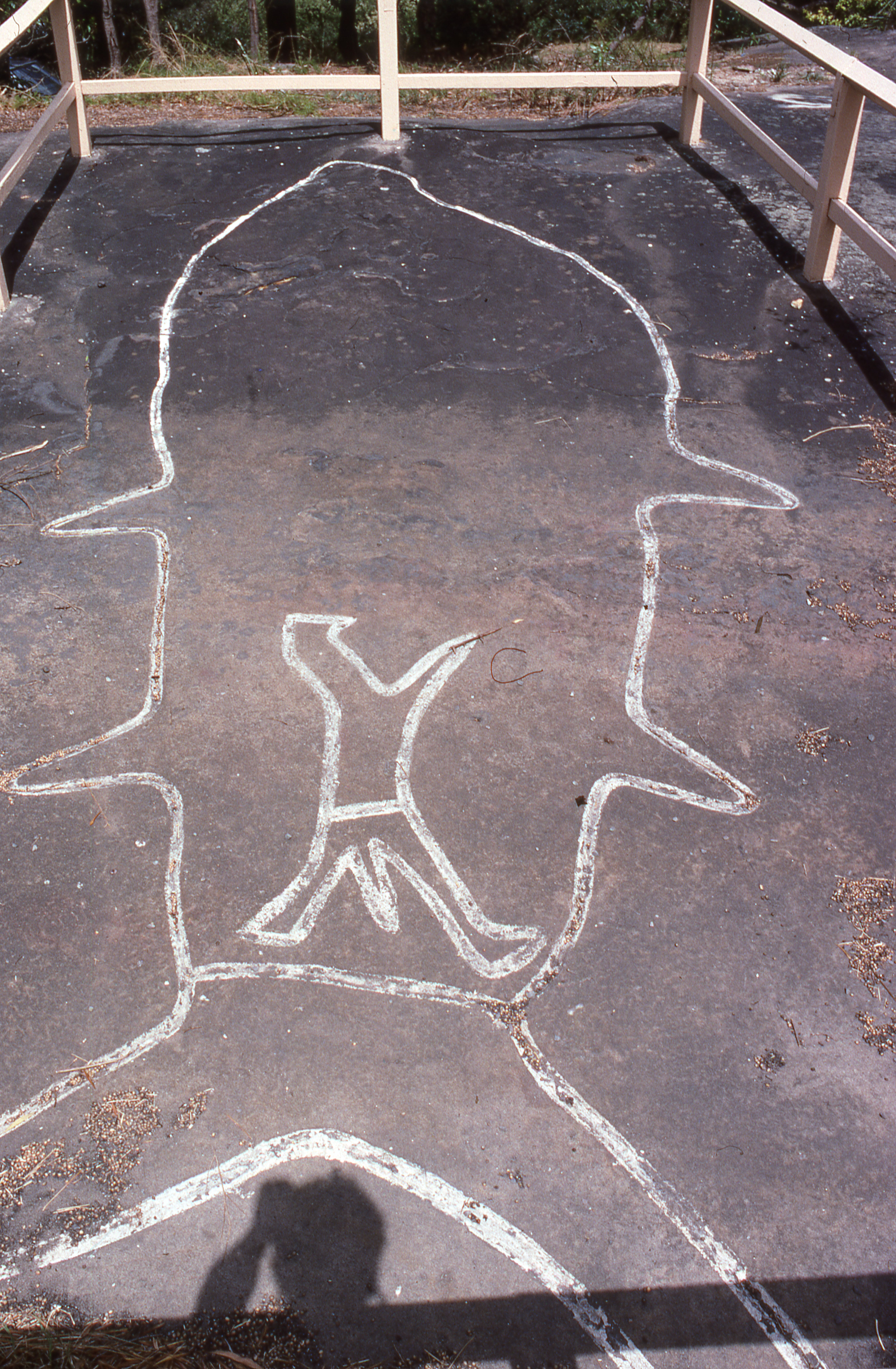
Aboriginal whale carving in the Waverton Peninsula Reserve, as it appeared in the 1980s (white paint was used to accentuate the grooves, but the carving has since been restored to its natural state)

Waverton is a harbour-side suburb on the lower North Shore of Sydney, New South Wales, Australia. Waverton is four kilometres north of the Sydney central business district, in the local government area of North Sydney.

== History ==
Waverton was named in 1929 after the Waverton Estate of an early resident, Richard Old. The land once belonged to William Carr, who named it after an English village connected to his family.

The North Shore railway line was extended south from St Leonards to Milsons Point in 1893. The station in this area for nearly forty years was known as Bay Road, after the thoroughfare that crosses the railway line. The local progress association recommended a change and Waverton was chosen in 1929.

== Heritage listings ==
Waverton has a number of heritage-listed sites, including:

- North Shore railway: Waverton railway station
- The Coal Loader, located on the west side of the peninsula, was established from 1913 to 1917. One of the oldest coal loaders in Sydney Harbour, it was originally a steam ship bunkering station, delivering coal from the Hunter Valley to ships in the harbour. It has been restored and is a popular spot on weekends.

== Transport ==
Waverton railway station is on the North Shore railway line of the Sydney Trains network.

Busways operates one bus route through Waverton, 265: Lane Cove to North Sydney via Wollstonecraft.

== Commercial area ==
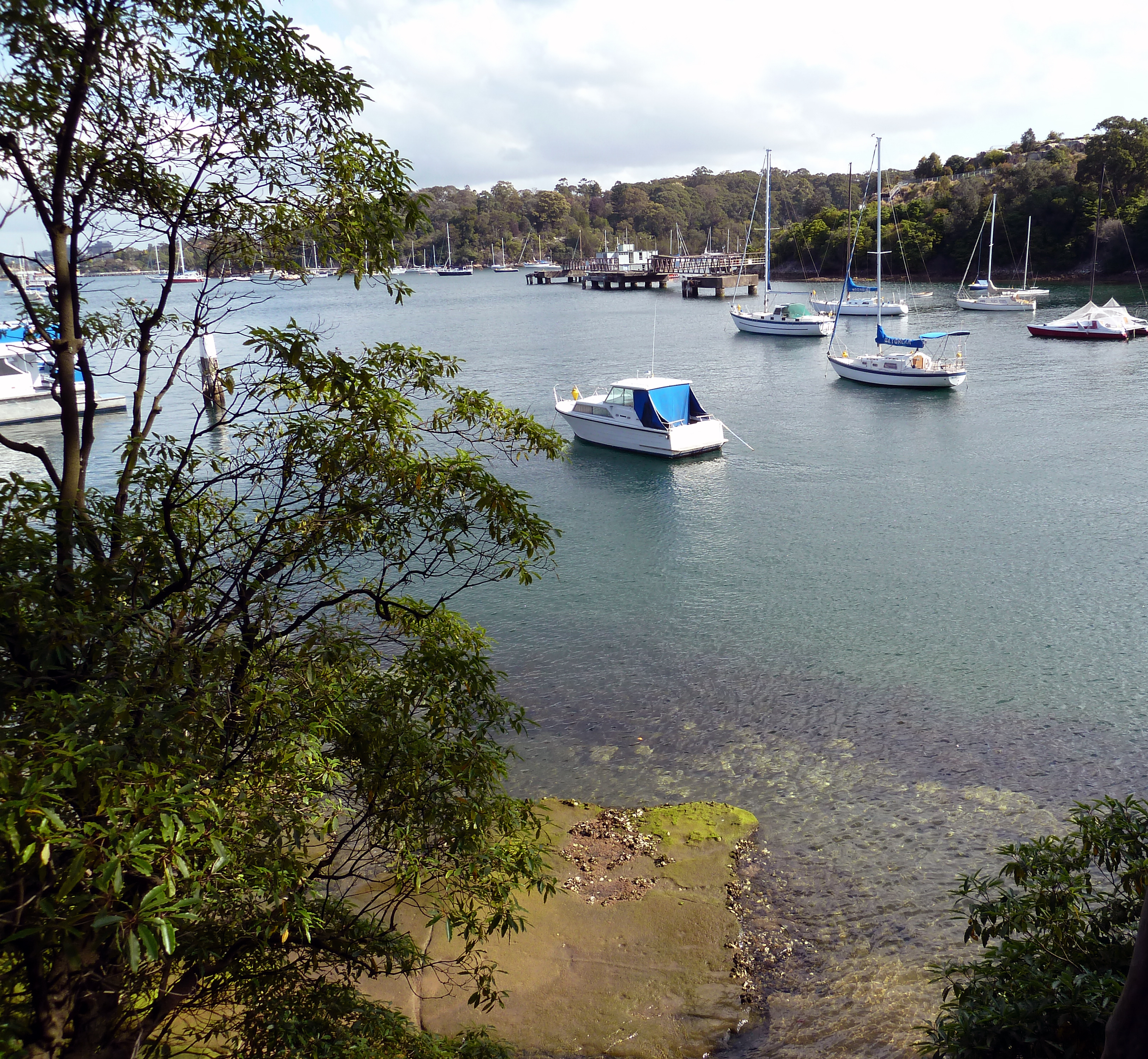
Berrys Bay

Waverton has a village-like collection of shops around the railway station, including an IGA supermarket, bottle shop, butcher, chemist and several restaurants and cafes. The naval base HMAS Waterhen is located on Balls Head Road.

== Recreation ==
Balls Head Reserve, the bushland peninsula, is a popular picnic destination especially when there are harbour fireworks such as on New Year's Eve. Its one-way road system also forms part of a favoured route for walkers and joggers, and contains many adjacent bushwalking paths.

Waverton Park, on the banks of Berrys Bay, with views of Sydney Harbour, is another recreation focal point.

The suburb is also home of training ships Cape Don, Sycamore and Young Endeavour berthed at the coal loader facility and HMAS Waterhen respectively.

The Cape Don is also a popular maritime museum.
