= Wollstonecraft railway station =

Railway station in Sydney, New South Wales, Australia

Wollstonecraft
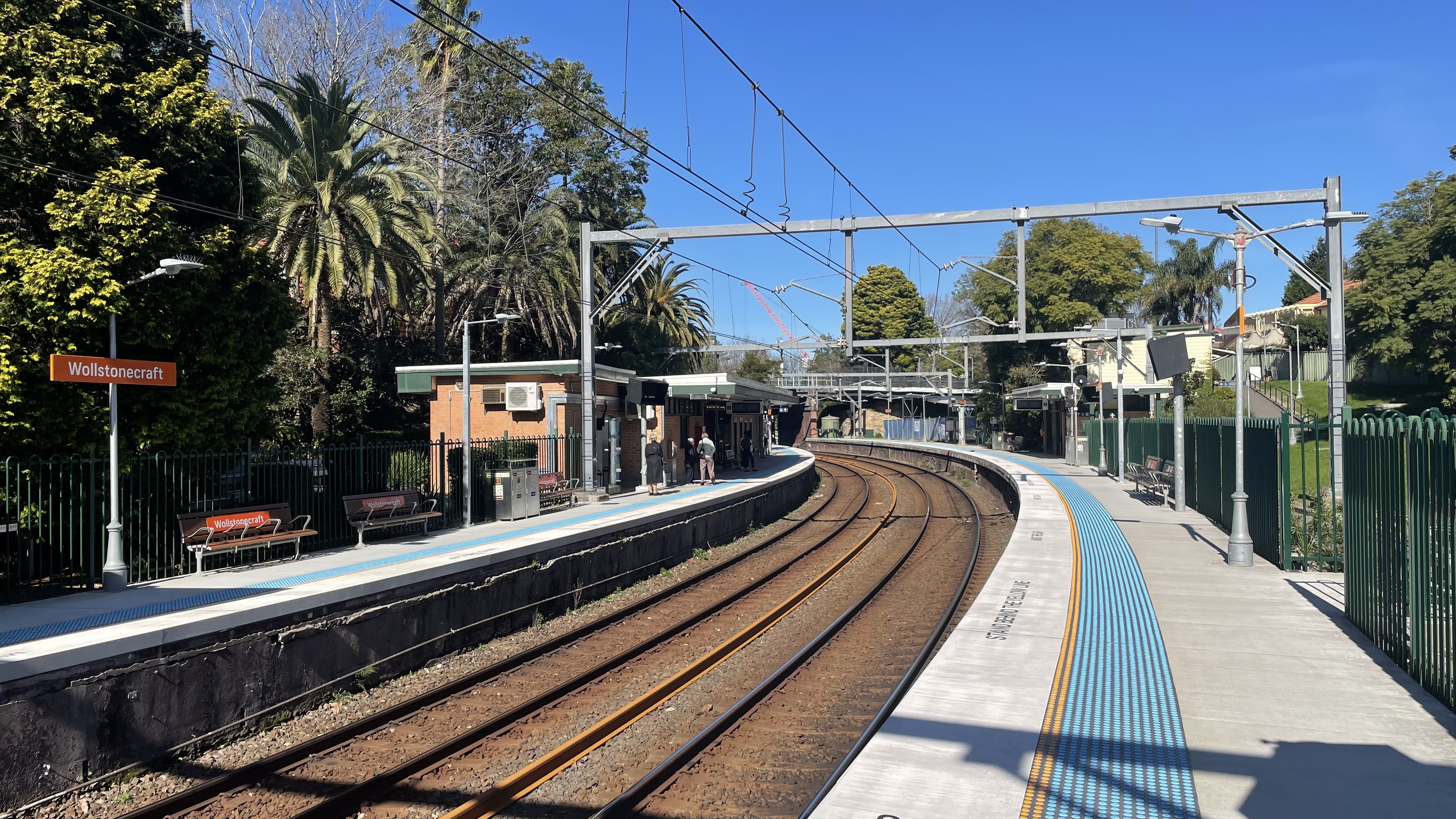
- Southbound view from Platform 2, July 2022

General information
- Location: Shirley Road, Wollstonecraft; Australia
- Coordinates: 33°49′55″S 151°11′30″E
- Elevation: 57 metres (187 ft)
- Owner: New South Wales Government via Transport Asset Manager of New South Wales
- Operator: Sydney Trains
- Line: North Shore
- Distance: 7.18 kilometres (4.46 mi) from Central
- Platforms: 2 (2 side)
- Tracks: 2
- Connections: Bus

Construction
- Structure type: Ground
- Accessible: Yes

Other information
- Status: Weekdays: Staffed: 6am to 7pm: Weekends and public holidays: Staffed: 8am to 4pm
- Station code: WSC
- Website: Transport for NSW

History
- Opened: 1 May 1893
- Rebuilt: 1980s
- Former names: Edwards Road (1893–1900)

Passengers
- 2023: 1,134,480 (year); 3,108 (daily) (Sydney Trains, NSW TrainLink)

Services
Preceding station	Sydney Trains	Following station
Waverton towards Emu Plains or Richmond	North Shore & Western Line	St Leonards towards Berowra
Waverton via Strathfield towards Hornsby	Northern Line	St Leonards towards Gordon
Preceding station	Intercity Trains	Following station
Waverton towards Central	Central Coast & Newcastle Line (peak hour services)	St Leonards towards Wyong
Location

Wollstonecraft railway station is a suburban railway station located on the North Shore line, serving the Sydney suburb of Wollstonecraft. It is served by Sydney Trains T1 North Shore & Western Line and T9 Northern Line services and intercity Central Coast & Newcastle Line services.

== History ==
Wollstonecraft station opened on 1 May 1893 when the North Shore line opened from St Leonards to Milsons Point. Originally named Edwards Road, named after J. G Edwards, it was renamed Wollstonecraft on 1 September 1900. The original buildings were replaced in the 1980s.

The platform is located on a sharp 200-metre radius curve, leading to complaints from residents about the squeal from train wheels.

In May 2022, an upgrade to the station was opened with accessibility upgrades including new bridges and lifts, raising the station platform and drainage works. Tendering for the upgrade started in mid-2020, with Downer being awarded to manage contractor contracts, with the work contracts being then awarded to RJS Infrastructure.

== Services ==
=== Platforms ===
Platform	Line	Stopping pattern	Notes
1	North Shore & Western Line	Services to Penrith, Emu Plains & Richmond via Central & Strathfield	
1	Northern Line (Sydney)	Services to Epping & Hornsby via Central & Strathfield	
1	Central Coast & Newcastle Line	6 Morning peak hour services to Sydney Central	
2	North Shore & Western Line	Services to Lindfield, Gordon, Hornsby & Berowra	
2	Northern Line (Sydney)	Services to Gordon	
2	Central Coast & Newcastle Line	6 Evening peak hour services to Gosford & Wyong via Gordon & Hornsby	

=== Transport links ===
Busways operates one bus route via Wollstonecraft station, under contract to Transport for NSW:

Milner Crescent:

- 265: Lane Cove to North Sydney
