= Waverton railway station, Sydney =

Railway station in Sydney, New South Wales, Australia

Waverton
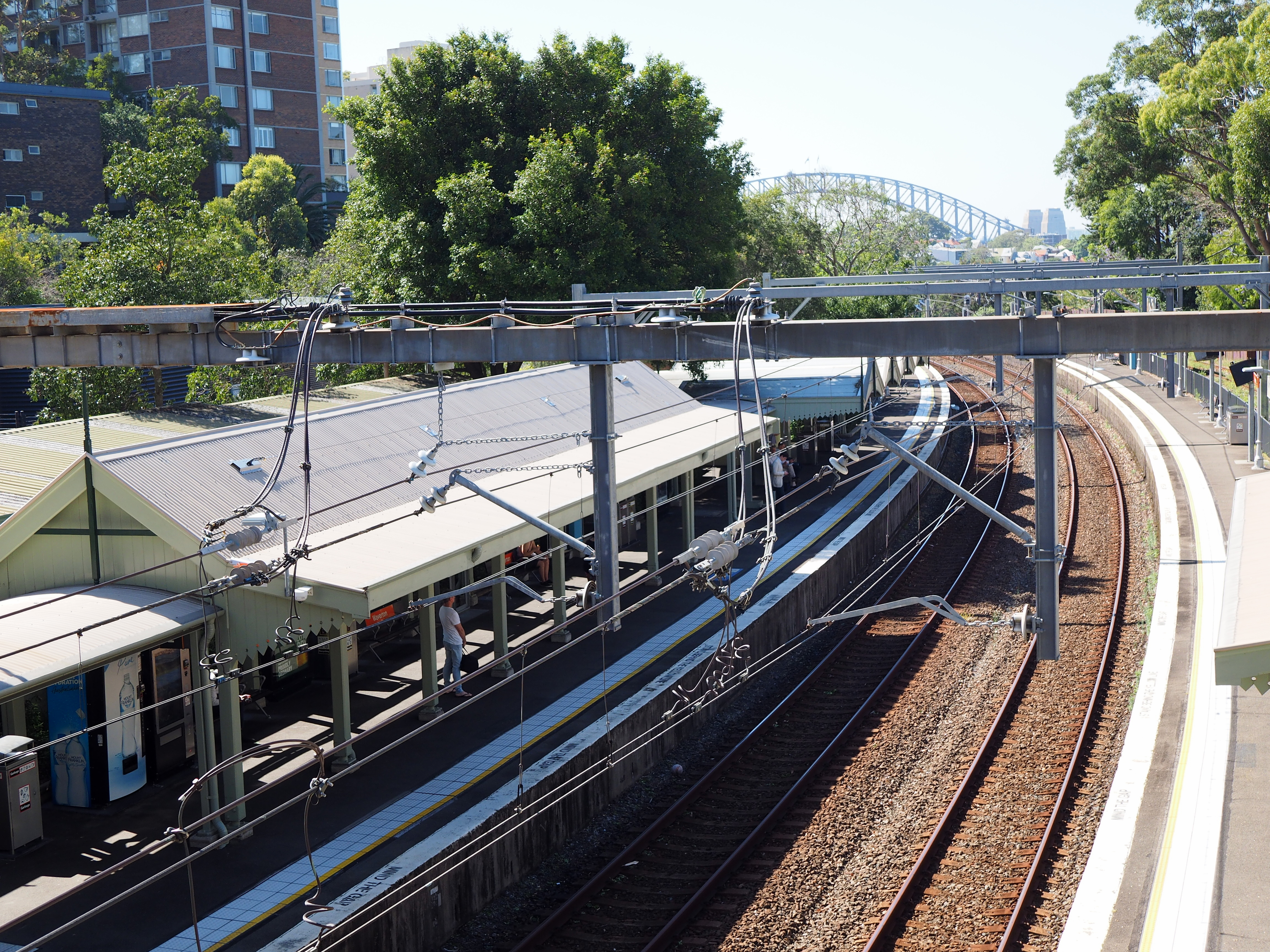
- Southbound view from station concourse looking at station platforms, December 2020

General information
- Location: Bay Road, Waverton; New South Wales; Australia
- Coordinates: 33°50′16″S 151°11′51″E
- Elevation: 40 metres (130 ft)
- Owner: New South Wales Government via Transport Asset Manager of New South Wales
- Operator: Sydney Trains
- Line: North Shore
- Distance: 6.11 km (3.80 mi) from Central
- Platforms: 2 (2 side)
- Tracks: 3
- Connections: Bus

Construction
- Structure type: Ground
- Accessible: Yes
- Architect: New South Wales Department of Railways

Other information
- Status: Weekdays: Staffed: 6am to 7pm: Weekends and public holidays: Staffed: 8am to 4pm
- Station code: WVT
- Website: Transport for NSW

History
- Opened: 1 May 1893 (133 years ago)
- Electrified: Yes; 1927
- Former names: Bay Road (1895–1929)

Passengers
- 2023: 1,039,210 (year); 2,847 (daily) (Sydney Trains, NSW TrainLink)

Services
Preceding station	Sydney Trains	Following station
North Sydney towards Emu Plains or Richmond	North Shore & Western Line	Wollstonecraft towards Berowra
North Sydney via Strathfield towards Hornsby	Northern Line	Wollstonecraft towards Gordon
Preceding station	Intercity Trains	Following station
North Sydney towards Central	Central Coast & Newcastle Line (peak hour services)	Wollstonecraft towards Wyong

New South Wales Heritage Register
- Official name: Waverton Railway Station group
- Type: State heritage (complex / group)
- Designated: 2 April 1999
- Reference no.: 1284
- Type: Railway Platform / Station
- Category: Transport – Rail
- Builders: New South Wales Department of Railways
Location

Waverton railway station is a heritage-listed suburban railway station located on the North Shore line, serving the Sydney suburb of Waverton in New South Wales, Australia. It is served by Sydney Trains T1 North Shore & Western Line and T9 Northern Line services and intercity Central Coast & Newcastle Line services. The station is located on Bay Road, Waverton, in the North Sydney Council local government area of New South Wales, Australia. It was designed and built by New South Wales Department of Railways. It is also known as Waverton Railway Station group. The station was added to the New South Wales State Heritage Register on 2 April 1999.

== History ==
Waverton railway station is located on the North Shore line, between Wollstonecraft and North Sydney railway stations. The North Shore of Sydney can be defined as a relatively narrow strip of land extending from Milsons Point to Waitara, a distance of approximately 20 kilometres (12 mi).

In 1887, tenders were called for construction of a branch line extending south from Hornsby to the North Shore. The 16.8 km section between Hornsby and St Leonards was opened on 1 January 1890. Stations provided at the opening of the line included Chatswood and St Leonards. A single line was constructed at the time. The line between St Leonards and Milsons Point (the terminus at the edge of the harbour) was completed 1 May 1893.

Waverton Railway Station was opened on 1 May 1895. At the time, the station was named Bay Road but on 20 May 1929, Bay Road was renamed Waverton - the name it carries today.

The area was scarcely settled in 1893, but a committee of inquiry found that the route for the line recommended was the best to give a good grade for the railway to the harbourside, hence the route opening up new areas for settlement. The line between St Leonards and Milsons Point (the terminus) was built as double track and both Wollstonecraft and Waverton stations were built to suit the duplicated track from the outset.

At the time of opening, Waverton railway station consisted of two side platforms (for Up and Down North Shore lines), with a small timber station building on each of the platforms. Bay Road tunnel (and Lavender Bay tunnel) were both built during construction of the line between St Leonards and Milsons Point and opened for service as double track tunnels in 1893. After leaving the previous station (Wollstonecraft), the North Shore line passes through a series of curves before passing through the relatively short Bay Road tunnel ('S' curve within the tunnel), then a rock cutting before entering Waverton station. The rock cutting is spanned by a bridge carrying a local road (Bay Road). The Booking Office for Waverton Railway Station was built on the overhead bridge with steps leading down to each of the platforms at the time of opening. After Waverton, the line then proceeded to the original Milsons Point station at Lavender Bay.

Electrification of the North Shore line was opened in 1927, with full electric services in 1928. Automatic signalling followed and most signal boxes on the line were closed. The signalling in the vicinity of Waverton was then controlled by North Sydney signal box.

With the opening of the Sydney Harbour Bridge in 1932 and construction of new stations at North Sydney and Milsons Point on a much higher level (to suit the bridge arrangements), the trackwork at Waverton was substantially altered. The original line which was laid down the grade, through the Lavender Bay tunnel to the original Milsons Point station at Lavender Bay became a branch line. The original terminus sidings at Milsons Point was then re-used as off peak storage sidings for the suburban electric cars, and is still in use today. To suit this new arrangement and allow electric car sets to either re-enter service after storage at the sidings, or for car sets to proceed to the sidings, a new dead-end siding was laid in behind the existing Down main platform at Waverton, but at a slightly higher level. Trains from the storage sidings would proceed into the dead-end, reverse and proceed through points toward North Sydney, whereas trains coming out of service would enter the dead-end siding from North Sydney, reverse and proceed down to Lavender Bay. This arrangement is still in use today.

The 1895-built overhead Booking Office was replaced in 1993, with the design of the original structure and original features such as steps being repeated in the new building.

The station received an accessibility upgrade which included lifts on each platform at some point between October 1994 and September 1998. It was one of the first low patronage stations in Sydney to receive an easy access upgrade, along with Pennant Hills.

The station received unusual attention in January 2007, when part of the Platform 2 face was seen to have an apparition of Jesus Christ on it. Church leaders are unconvinced but remaining open-minded about the apparition, which has been explained as a combination of worn away paint and moss. People visited the station to see the apparition, requiring station staff to ensure that no observer is hit by a passing train.

== Description ==
=== Buildings ===
Overhead Booking Office – 1993 replica of 1893 building

=== Context ===
Waverton Railway Station consists of two platforms, platform shelters, new stairs and lifts, and an overhead booking office.

=== Overhead booking office (1993) ===
The present building was rebuilt in 1993 substantially in the form and design of the original 1893 structure. The building fronts Bay Rd and spans across both railway tracks and is a single storey weatherboard building with corrugated-iron gabled roof with timber finials and gablets. The streetside verandah is supported on timber posts with decorative cast iron valance.

=== Condition ===
As at 10 September 2008, the station building was good.

=== Modifications and dates ===
Waverton Booking Office remains on the bridge much as it was built in 1893. Apart from a number of shelters on the platforms, there are no other railway buildings at Waverton station. Lifts have been added to the station arrangements in recent years.

== Services ==
=== Platforms ===
Platform	Line	Stopping pattern	Notes
1	North Shore & Western Line	Services to Penrith, Emu Plains & Richmond via Central & Strathfield	
1	Northern Line (Sydney)	Services to Epping & Hornsby via Central & Strathfield	
1	Central Coast & Newcastle Line	6 Morning peak hour services to Sydney Central	
2	North Shore & Western Line	Services to Lindfield, Gordon, Hornsby & Berowra	
2	Northern Line (Sydney)	Services to Gordon	
2	Central Coast & Newcastle Line	6 Evening peak hour services to Gosford & Wyong via Gordon & Hornsby	

=== Transport links ===
Busways operates one bus route via Waverton station, under contract to Transport for NSW:

Bay Rd:

- 265: Lane Cove to North Sydney

Waverton station is served by two NightRide routes:

- N90: Hornsby station to Town Hall station
- N91: Bondi Junction to Macquarie Park

== Gallery ==
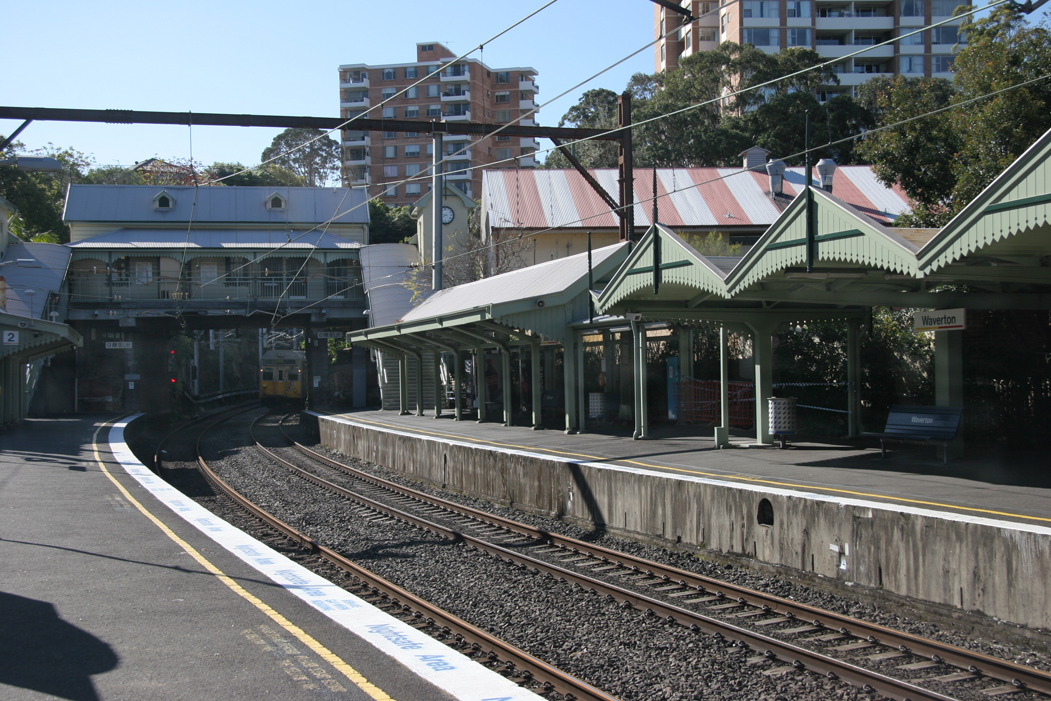
Station platforms and concourse building in September 2006

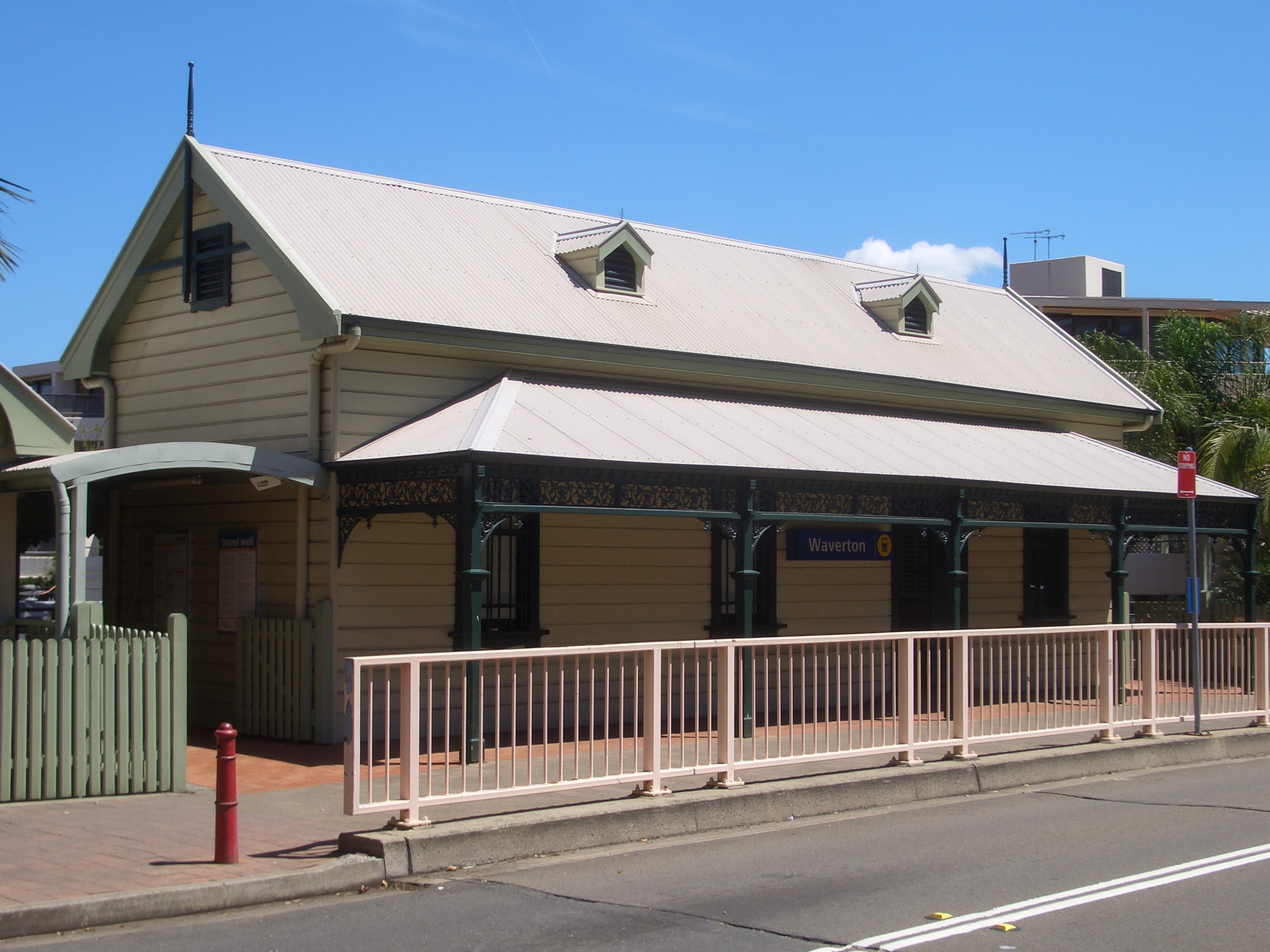
Waverton railway station's booking office

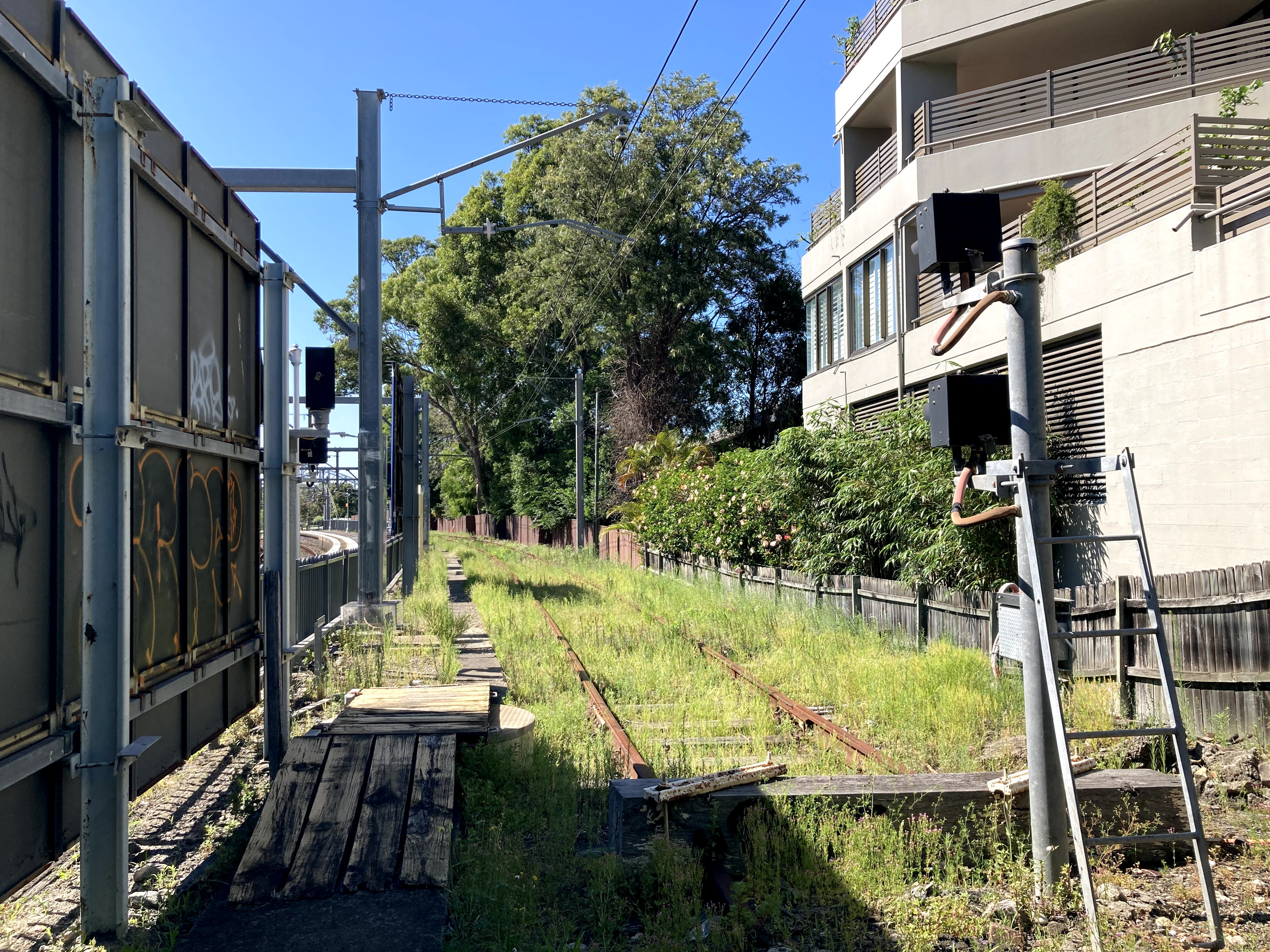
A siding adjacent to the northbound platform in 2020

== Heritage listing ==
As at 8 May 2013, Waverton Railway Station Building has significance for its aesthetic contribution to the historic character of the North Shore Line as a whole. The current overhead booking office was rebuilt in 1993, substantially in the form and detail of the original 1893 structure and makes an important contribution to the streetscape and surrounding setting.

Waverton railway station was listed on the New South Wales State Heritage Register on 2 April 1999 having satisfied the following criteria.

The place is important in demonstrating the course, or pattern, of cultural or natural history in New South Wales.

The place has historical significance for its associations with the opening of the Short North Line (connecting the North Shore to the harbour) and the resulting phase of increased development in the surrounding area in the late 19th century.

The place is important in demonstrating aesthetic characteristics and/or a high degree of creative or technical achievement in New South Wales.

Waverton Railway Station has significance for its aesthetic contribution to the historic character of the North Shore Line as a whole. The current overhead booking office was rebuilt in 1993, substantially in the form and detail of the original 1893 structure and makes an important contribution to the streetscape and surrounding setting.

The place has strong or special association with a particular community or cultural group in New South Wales for social, cultural or spiritual reasons.

The place has the potential to contribute to the local community's sense of place and can provide a connection to the local community's history.

== See also ==
- List of railway stations in Sydney
