= Wollstonecraft, New South Wales =

Suburb of Sydney, New South Wales

Wollstonecraft
- Suburb
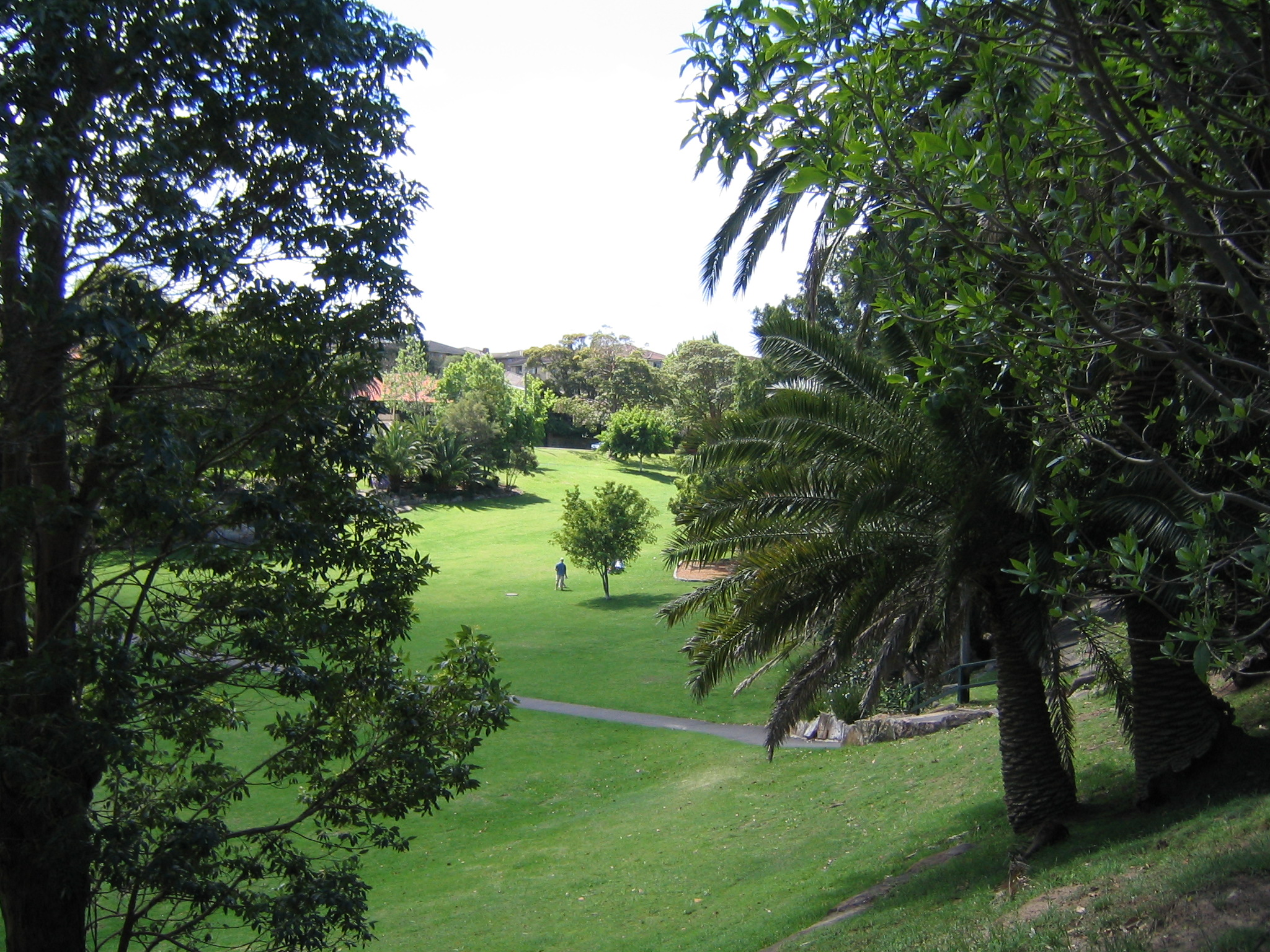
- Brennan Park

- Interactive map of Wollstonecraft
- Coordinates: 33°50′01″S 151°11′29″E
- Country: Australia
- State: New South Wales
- City: Sydney
- LGA: North Sydney Council
- Location: 4 km (2.5 mi) north of Sydney CBD

Government
  - State electorate: North Shore
  - Federal division: Warringah

Area
  - Total: 1.2 km^{2} (0.46 sq mi)
- Elevation: 61 m (200 ft)

Population
  - Total: 8,115 (2021 census)
  - Density: 6,760/km^{2} (17,500/sq mi)
- Postcode: 2065
Suburbs around Wollstonecraft
St Leonards	St Leonards	Crows Nest
Greenwich	Wollstonecraft	North Sydney
Greenwich	Waverton	North Sydney

Wollstonecraft (UK: /ˈwʊlstənkrɑːft/ WUUL-stən-krahft, US: /-kræft/ -kraft) is a harbourside suburb on the lower North Shore of Sydney, New South Wales, Australia, 4 kilometres north of the Sydney central business district, in the local government area of North Sydney Council.

== History ==
Wollstonecraft was named after Edward Wollstonecraft, the first settler to receive a land grant of 500 acres (200 hectares) in the area, in 1821. Wollstonecraft left England to seek fortune for himself and his sister Elizabeth and to escape the notoriety of his aunt, Mary Wollstonecraft, author of the book A Vindication of the Rights of Woman.

Edward Wollstonecraft's business associate, Alexander Berry, was another prominent resident in the area, and namesake of Berry Island, a harbour-side location in Wollstonecraft.

The area is part of the traditional lands of the Cammeraygal people of the Eora nation.

As of 2019 Wollstonecraft is ranked as the 6th most liveable suburb in Sydney out of the 569 on Domain.

== Population ==
In the 2021 Census, there were 8,115 people in Wollstonecraft. 56.4% of people were born in Australia. The next most common countries of birth were England 6.4%, China 3.9%, India 2.7%, New Zealand 2.6% and Hong Kong 2.4%. 71.4% of people spoke only English at home. Other languages spoken at home included Mandarin 4.3%, Cantonese 4.1%, Japanese 1.6% and Spanish 1.5%. The most common responses for religion were No Religion 48.5%, Catholic 19.3%, Anglican 10.1 and Buddhism 2.7%.

Historical Population (1991 – 2021)
1991	1996	2001	2006	2011	2016	2021
5696	6355	7572	7580	8012	8323	8115

== Natural Reserves and Parks ==
- Badangi Reserve – Badangi Reserve is a small protected reserve with one main path connecting adjacent Berry Island and Wondakiah up to Bridge End road near the trainline
- Berry Island – The most well known park in the suburb which has a large open grass strip next to the harbour and a loop bush track with a lookout overlooking the inner harbour as well as Indigenous rock engravings further along the trail.
- Gore Cove Reserve – Long waterside bush trail up Berry's creek from Berry Island up to Smoothey park and Wollstonecraft railway station.
- Brennan Park – Popular park next to Waverton and the train line with a large playground and open space.
- Smoothey Park
- Oyster Cove Reserve
- Harry Howard Reserve
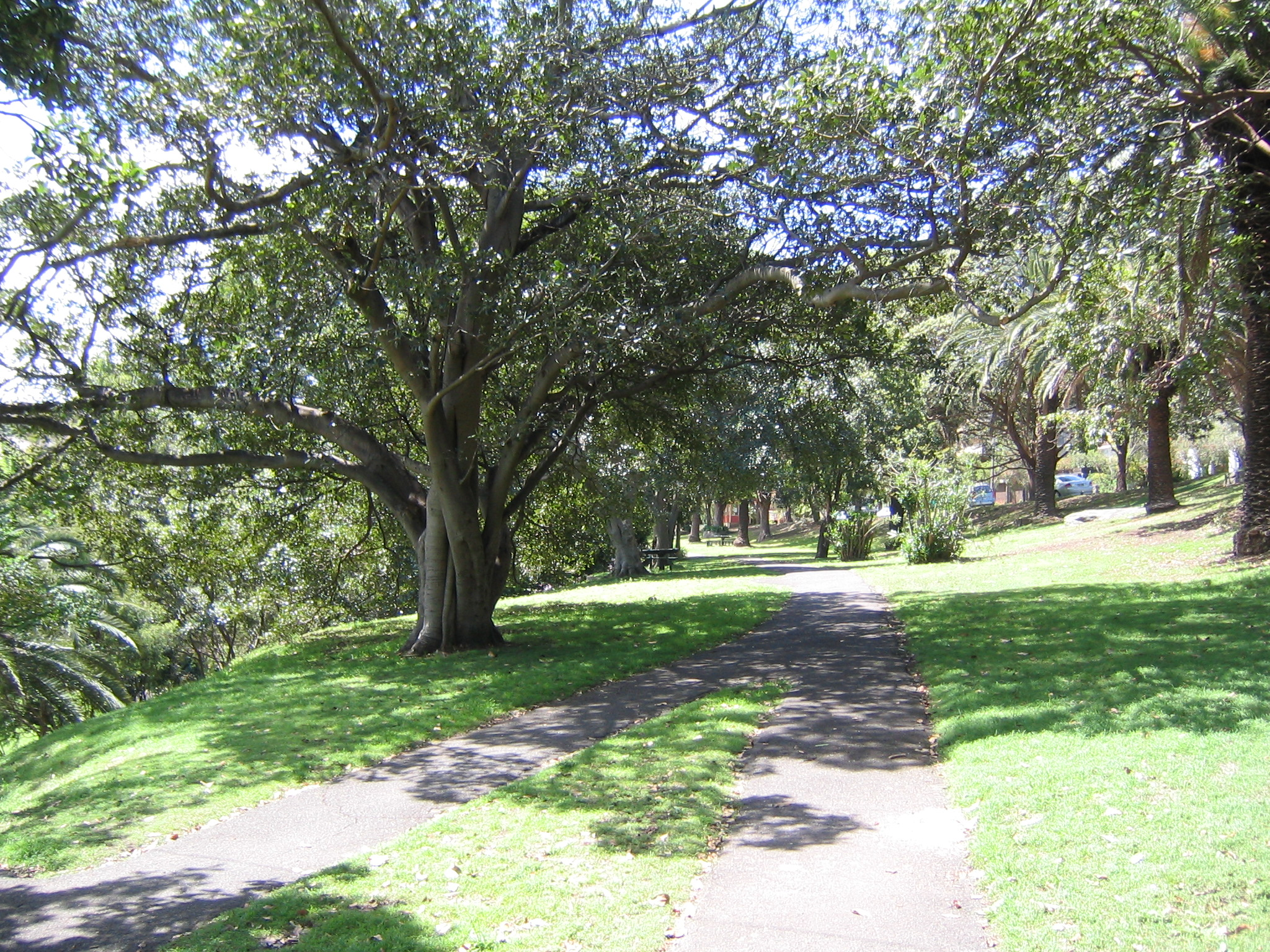
Brennan Park

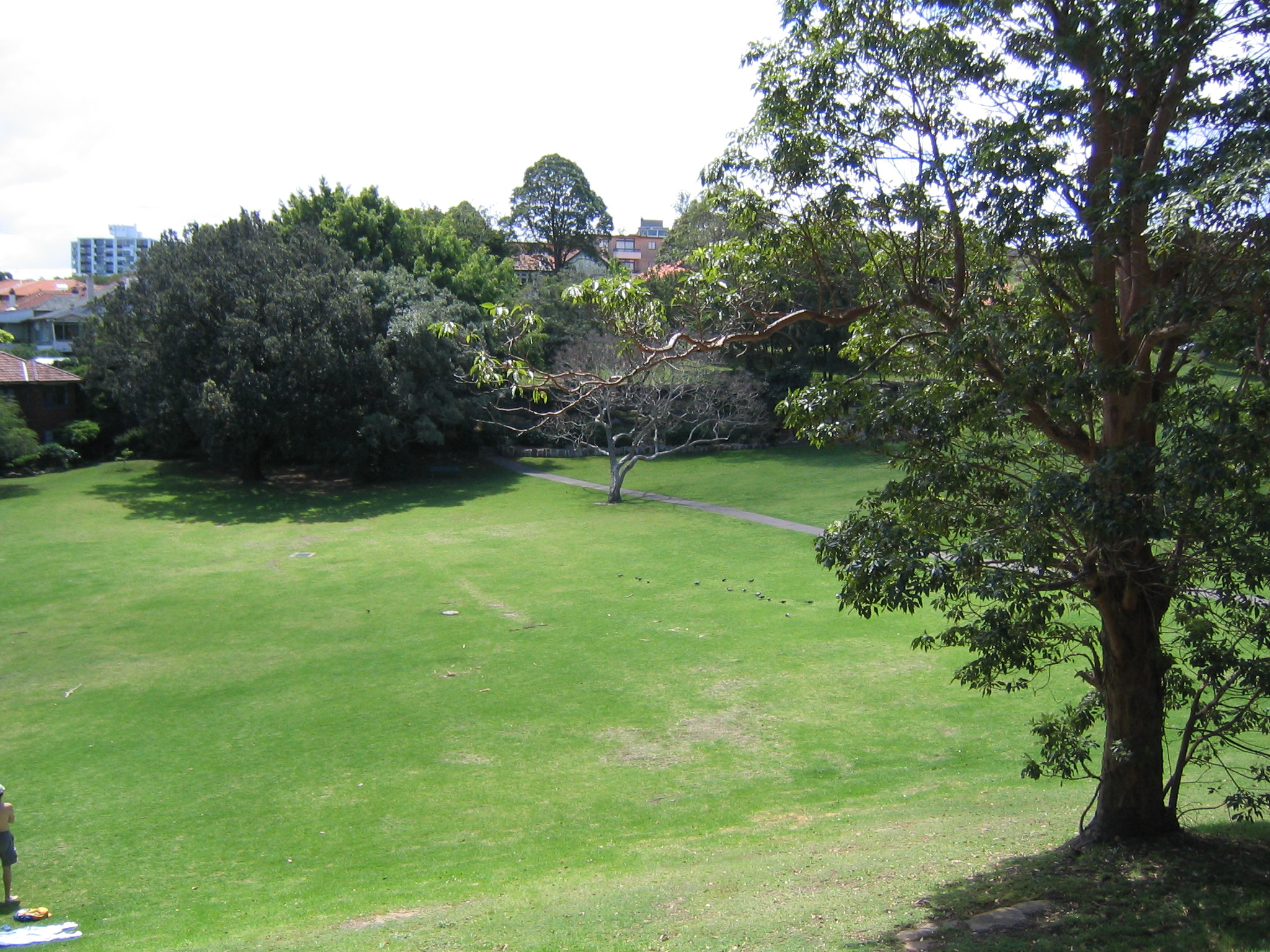
View over Brennan Park

== Transport ==
Wollstonecraft railway station is on the North Shore railway line.

== Notable residents ==
- John Howard, former Prime Minister of Australia.

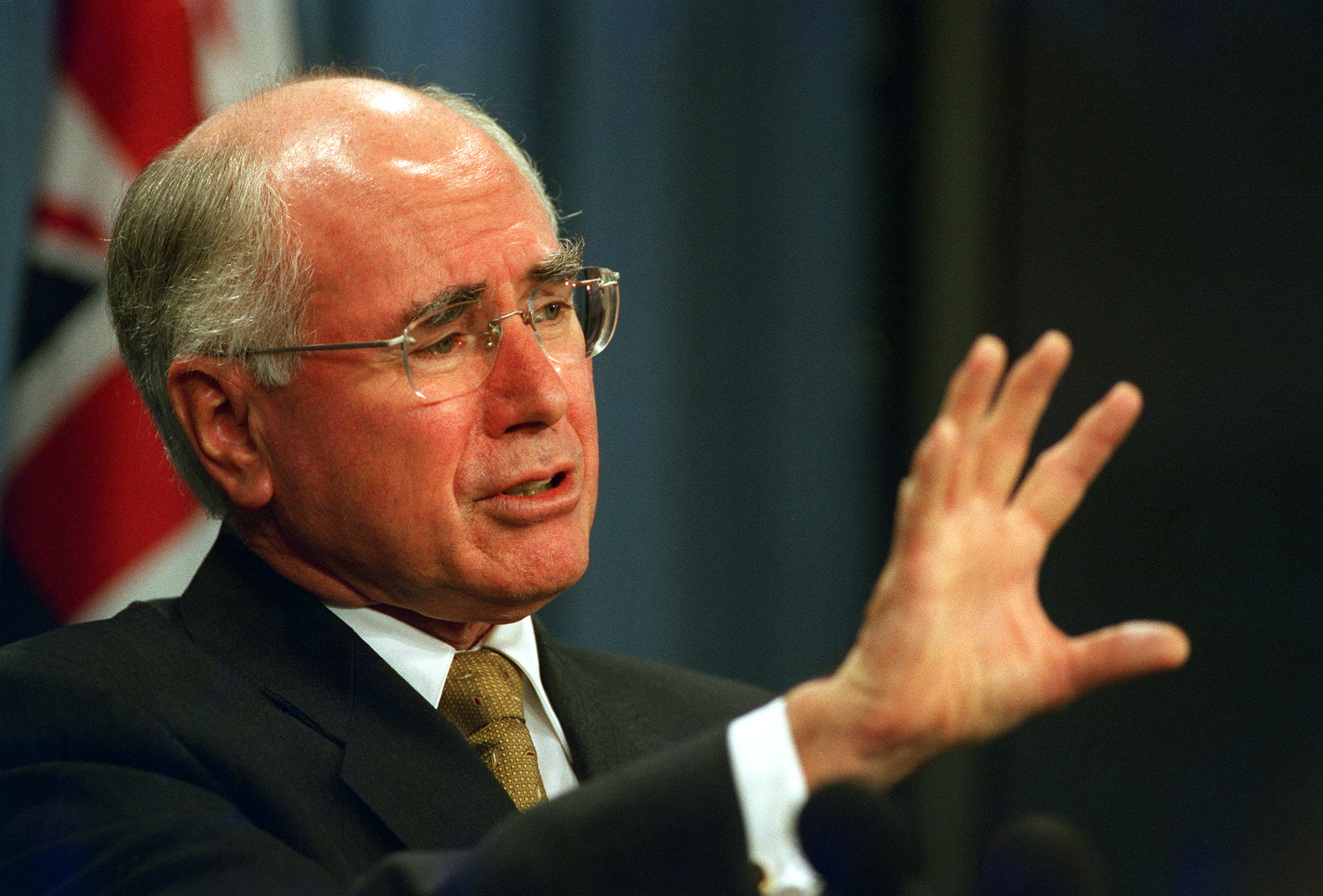
John Howard
