= Artarmon railway station =

Railway station in Sydney, New South Wales, Australia

Artarmon
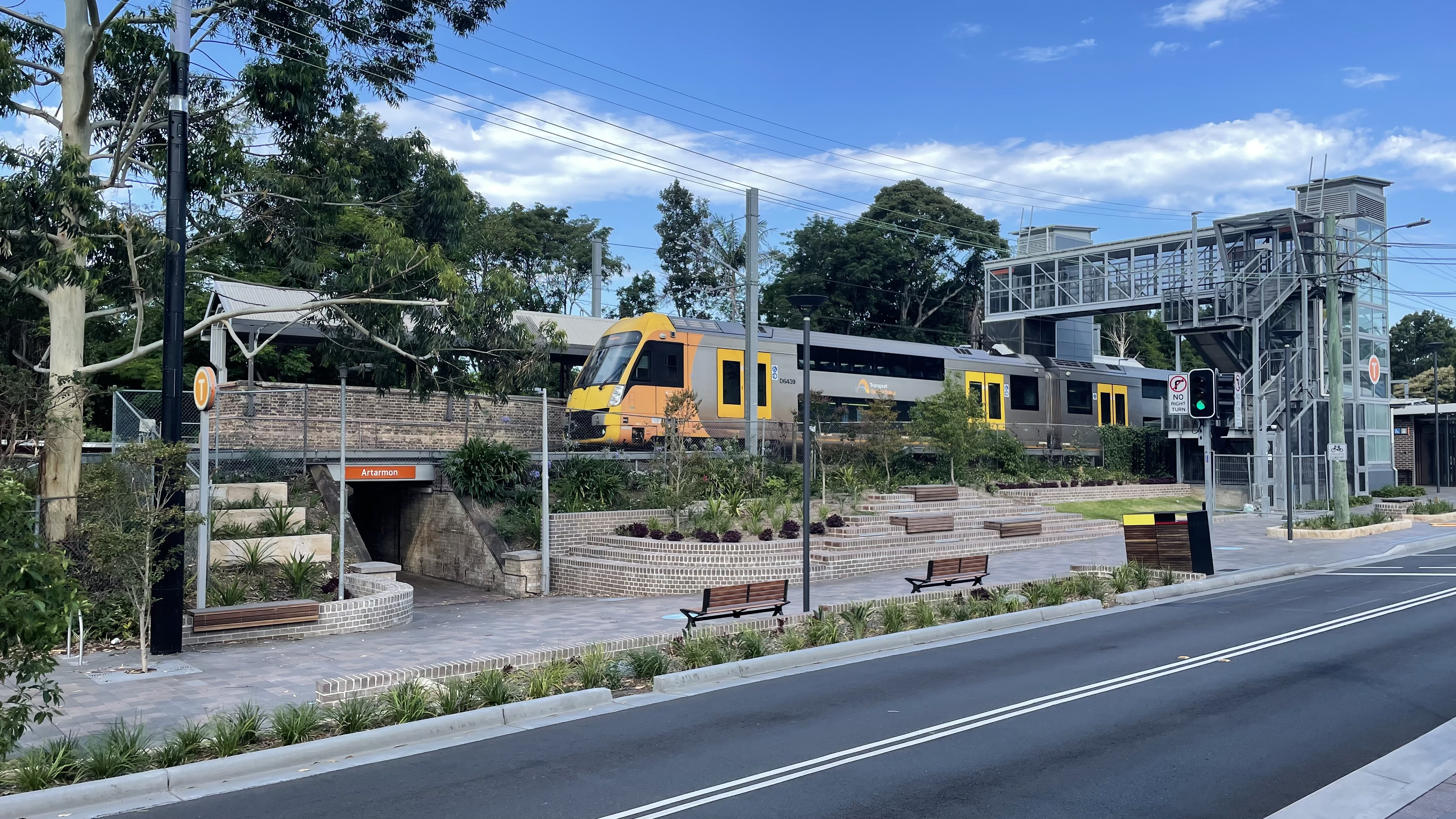
- Hampden Road entrance

General information
- Location: Hampden Road, Artarmon, New South Wales, Australia
- Coordinates: 33°48′31″S 151°11′06″E
- Elevation: 85 metres (279 ft)
- Owner: New South Wales Government via Transport Asset Manager of New South Wales
- Operator: Sydney Trains
- Line: North Shore
- Distance: 10.30 km (6.40 mi) from Central
- Platforms: 2 (1 island)
- Tracks: 2
- Connections: Bus

Construction
- Structure type: Ground
- Accessible: Yes

Other information
- Status: Weekdays: Staffed: 6am to 10pm: Weekends and public holidays: Staffed: 6am to 7pm
- Station code: ATO
- Website: Transport for NSW

History
- Opened: 6 July 1898 (128 years ago)
- Rebuilt: 7 October 1900
- Electrified: Yes (1927)

Passengers
- 2025: 2,250,278 (year); 6,165 (daily) (Sydney Trains, NSW TrainLink)
- Rank: 70

Services
Preceding station	Sydney Trains	Following station
St Leonards towards Emu Plains or Richmond	North Shore & Western Line	Chatswood towards Berowra
St Leonards via Strathfield towards Hornsby	Northern Line	Chatswood towards Gordon
Preceding station	Intercity Trains	Following station
St Leonards towards Central	Central Coast & Newcastle Line (peak hour services)	Chatswood towards Wyong
Location

Artarmon railway station is a suburban railway station located on the North Shore line, serving the Sydney suburb of Artarmon. It is served by Sydney Trains T1 North Shore & Western Line and T9 Northern Line services and intercity Central Coast & Newcastle Line services.

== History ==
A temporary Artarmon station opened on 6 July 1898, before the present station opened on 7 October 1900. It was named after an original Crown grant where the station is now. In April 2015, work commenced on the construction of a new footbridge that will include lifts at the northern end of the platform. The footbridge has since been finished in the same year.

== Services ==
=== Platforms ===
Platform	Line	Stopping pattern	Notes
1	T1	Services to Penrith, Emu Plains & Richmond via Central & Strathfield	
1	T9	Services to Epping & Hornsby via Central & Strathfield	
1	CCN	6 Morning peak hour services to Sydney Central	
2	T1	Services to Lindfield, Gordon, Hornsby & Berowra	
2	T9	Services to Gordon	
2	CCN	6 Evening peak hour services to Gosford & Wyong via Gordon & Hornsby	

=== Transport links ===
Artarmon station is served by two NightRide routes:

Hampden St:

- N90: Hornsby station to Town Hall station
- N91: Bondi Junction to Macquarie Park

== Gallery ==
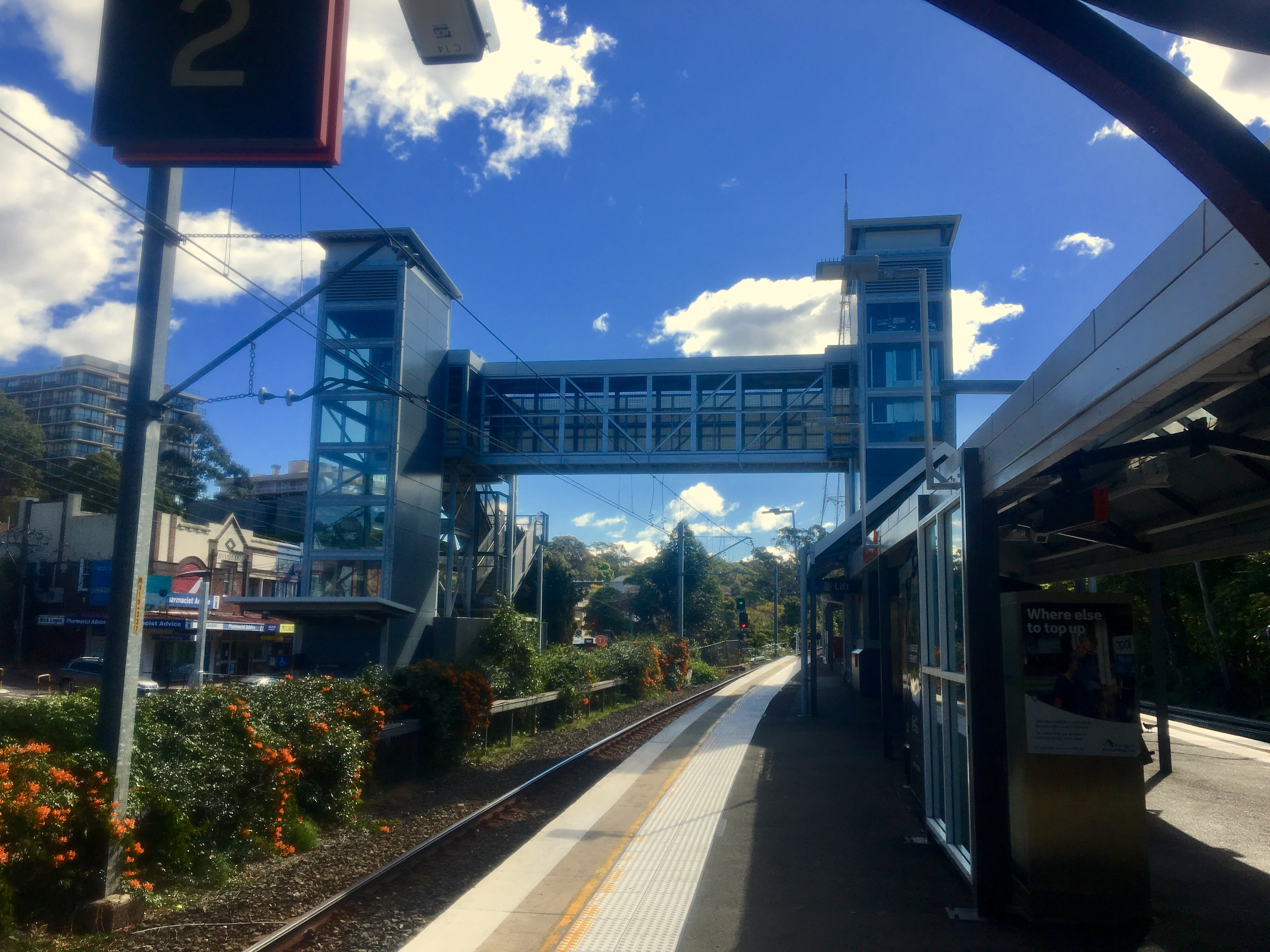
The accessible footbridge providing station access
