= Milsons Point railway station =

Railway station in Sydney, New South Wales, Australia

Milsons Point
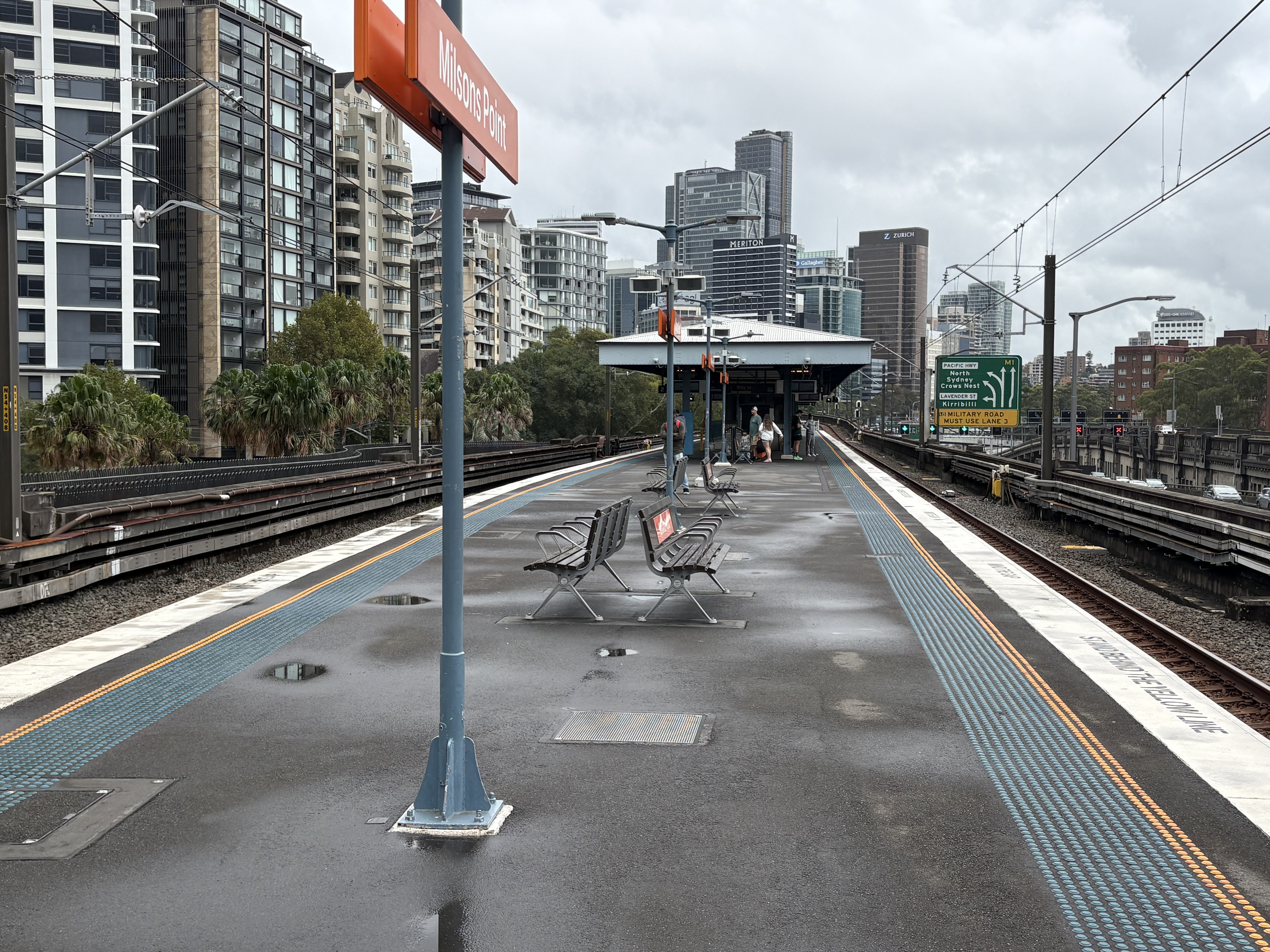
- Northbound view from the platforms in April 2026

General information
- Location: Alfred Street, Milsons Point, New South Wales; Australia
- Coordinates: 33°50′46″S 151°12′42″E
- Elevation: 48 metres (157 ft)
- Owner: Transport Asset Manager of New South Wales
- Operator: Sydney Trains
- Line: North Shore
- Distance: 4.44 km (2.76 mi) from Central
- Platforms: 2 (1 island)
- Tracks: 2
- Connections: Bus; Milsons Point

Construction
- Structure type: Elevated
- Accessible: Yes
- Architect: Sydney Harbour Bridge Branch NSW Department of Public Works

Other information
- Status: Staffed
- Station code: MPT
- Website: Transport for NSW

History
- Opened: 1 May 1893 (133 years ago)
- Rebuilt: 19 March 1932
- Electrified: Yes (1927)

Passengers
- 2025: 4,011,728 (year); 10,991 (daily) (Sydney Trains)
- Rank: 44

Services
| Preceding station | Sydney Trains | Following station |
|---|---|---|
| Wynyard towards Emu Plains or Richmond | North Shore & Western Line | North Sydney towards Berowra |
| Wynyard via Strathfield towards Hornsby | Northern Line | North Sydney towards Gordon |
| Preceding station | Intercity Trains | Following station |
| Wynyard towards Central | Central Coast & Newcastle Line (peak hour services) | North Sydney towards Gosford or Wyong |

New South Wales Heritage Register
- Official name: Milsons Point Railway Station group; Sydney Harbour Bridge
- Type: State heritage (complex / group)
- Designated: 2 April 1999
- Reference no.: 1194
- Type: Railway Platform / Station
- Category: Transport – Rail
- Builders: Sydney Harbour Bridge Branch Department of Public Works
Location

Milsons Point railway station is a heritage-listed suburban railway station located on the North Shore line, serving the Sydney suburb of Milsons Point. It is served by Sydney Trains T1 North Shore & Western Line and T9 Northern Line services and intercity Central Coast & Newcastle Line services. The station is elevated and is accessible via both stairs and a lift. It was designed and built by the Sydney Harbour Bridge Branch of the NSW Department of Public Works. The property was added to the New South Wales State Heritage Register on 2 April 1999.

== History ==
The original station on the day it closed to traffic

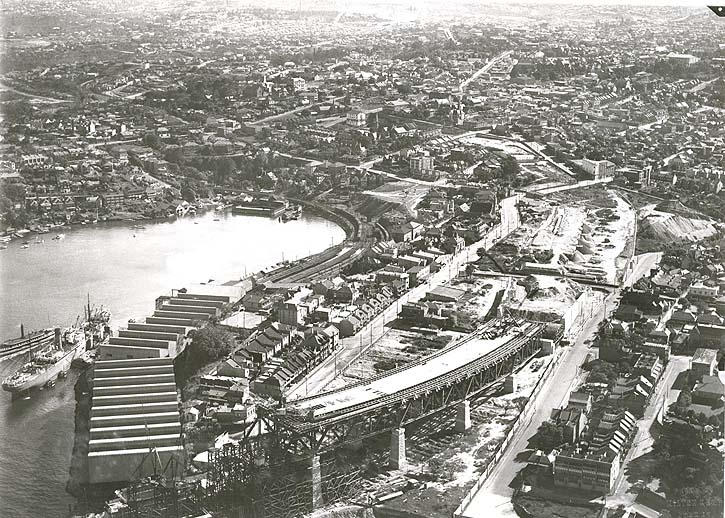
Aerial view of construction of the northern approach to the Sydney Harbour Bridge. The original railway alignment and construction work on the realignment for extension across the bridge can both be seen.

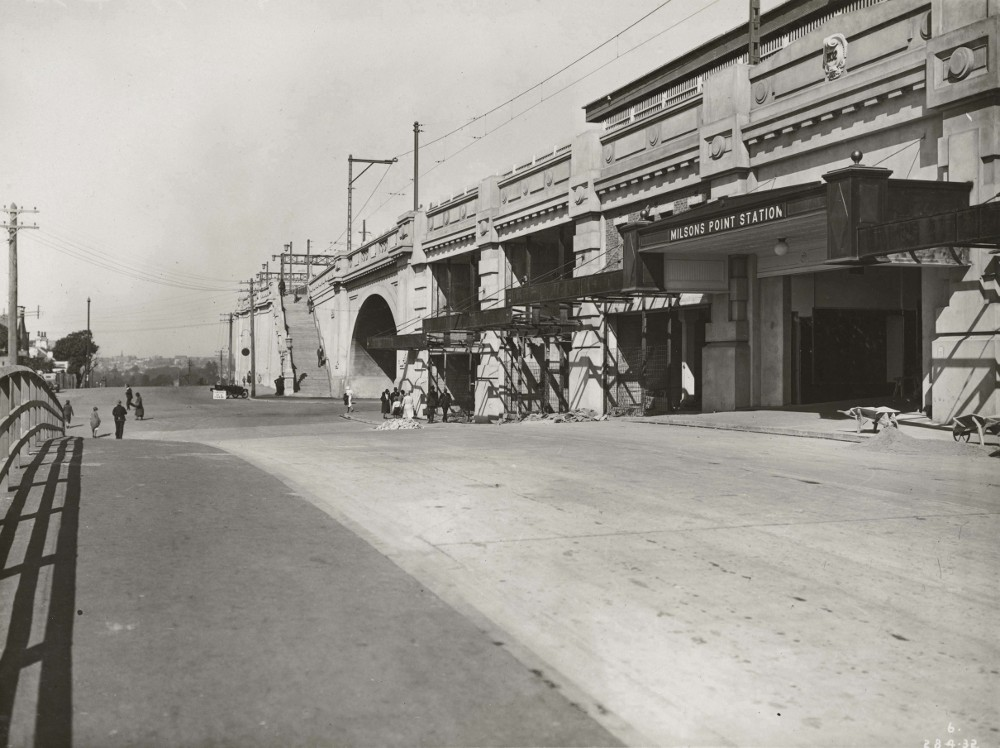
Eastern entrance

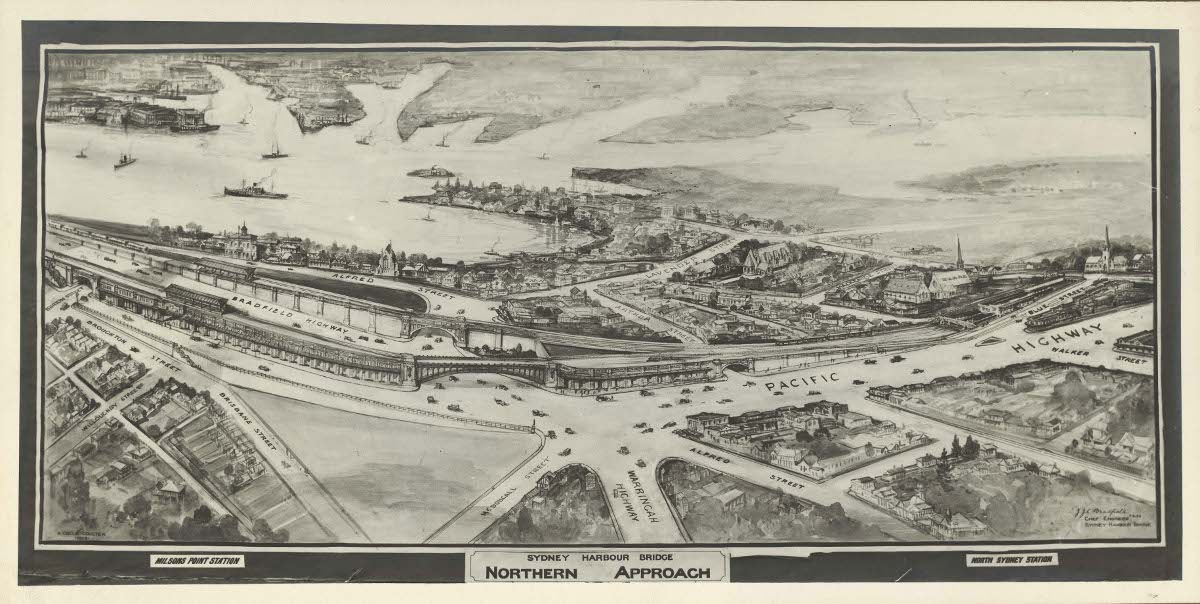
Sketch showing both pairs of platforms at Milsons Point

In 1815, government architect Francis Greenway, in a report to Governor Macquarie, proposed the building of a bridge from Dawes Point at the city's edge to the northern shore. The original Milsons Point station was not in its present location, but on the edge of Sydney Harbour approximately on the site of the present northern pylon of the Sydney Harbour Bridge and the North Sydney Olympic Pool. This location enabled passengers from the North Shore to transfer directly from steam trains to ferries to reach Circular Quay. It opened as the southern terminus of the North Shore railway line on 1 May 1893. when extended from its previous terminus at St Leonards (opened from Hornsby 1 January 1890). The site, squeezed between the rock cliffs and the edge of Sydney Harbour was cramped, with two side platforms, one of which was built on piles partly over the water's edge, and three tracks between, including a centre road. Immediately adjoining it to the west was the colonnaded Milsons Point ferry wharf for the ferry service to Circular Quay in the Sydney central business district and tram terminus for the North Sydney cable tramway (opened 22 May 1886) and subsequently electrified from 11 February 1900.

Concrete had been extensively used for foundations and walls since the 1890s. By 1910, reinforced concrete was in use, but not for superstructures directly supporting railway tracks. The Bellevue Street underbridge at Glebe was the first to use it for this purpose, in 1919.

In 1915, to enable a start on the construction of the Sydney Harbour Bridge between Milsons Point and Dawes Point, the Government instructed the Railway Commissioners to vacate the station and a new four platform, station was constructed at the site of the boundary fence between the present-day Luna Park and Lavender Bay Sidings. This station was in operation for just seven weeks, from 30 May 1915 to 18 July 1915, as the inconvenience to passengers transferring between ferries and trains was unacceptable. Due to later overcrowding, a third platform was added on 12 December 1920 by removing the centre road track and laying a new track on inland side of the new platform 2. This station remained in use until the site was requisitioned to allow construction of the Sydney Harbour Bridge.

It was not until 1922 that legislation was passed and acted upon, authorising the construction of a bridge. Tenders were invited in 1923 in accordance with general plans and specification prepared by Dr John Bradfield, Chief Engineer, Sydney Harbour Bridge and Railway Construction. The plans and specification provided the alternatives of a cantilever or an arch bridge. Twenty proposals were received from six different companies of various types of design. The tender of Dorman Long & Co Ltd, of Middlesbrough, England, for an arch bridge was accepted, the design being substantially in accordance with one of Dr Bradfield's proposals. The detailed design was carried out by the contractor's consulting engineer, Sir Ralph Freeman, and the fabrication and construction were under the direct charge of Mr Lawrence Ennis, a director of the firm. The design and construction of the bridge were supervised at all stages by Dr Bradfield and his staff.

=== Temporary station ===
From 27 April 1924, a new temporary station was brought into use, approximately 300 metres (980 ft) back along the line on the site of the present Lavender Bay car sidings, just beyond the present Luna Park amusement park. It was linked to the street by stairs and three escalators, and to a new adjacent ferry wharf. The escalators at Milsons Point were the first installed in Australia, one of which was transferred to Town Hall station when the temporary station closed. The tram line was also relocated to terminate adjacent to the entrance to the new station in Glen Street. First work on the bridge commenced in 1924 with construction of the bridge approaches and the approach spans. Construction of the approach spans was undertaken concurrently with erection of the steelwork for the actual bridge structure. The building of the approaches on the north side included the construction of North Sydney Station, Milsons Point Station and a number of underbridges to carry the railway. The approaches were designed and built by the Sydney Harbour Bridge Branch of the Public Works Department and the Metropolitan Railway Construction Branch of the NSW Government Railways. The northern approaches were built using spoil from the excavation of the North Sydney station site to build a ramp up to the main bridge level. Retaining walls of concrete, built by Monier Concrete, were built along Broughton and Alfred Streets and Bradfield and Pacific Highways.

The line from Hornsby to Milsons Point was electrified from 2 August 1927.

=== Current station ===
The Milsons Point station was constructed between 1929 and 1932 as part of the northern approaches. It was initially called Kirribilli Station, but was changed to Milsons Point before its opening. By June 1931 the station platform had been completed and a portion of the platform awnings had also been erected. The railway decking had advanced as far as Milsons Point, tracks had begun to be laid and the transoms delivered for installation. By January 1932 the platforms had been covered with asphalt, the brickwork of the shops in the arcade below the station was completed as was the tiling, the laying of magnesite flooring in the station office, terrazzo flooring in the lavatories, the erection of the metal awnings at the Alfred Street and Broughton Street entrances, terracotta facing to the station and installation of gates and barriers. Trackwork was completed and ballast laid along the tracks at the same time.

On 19 March 1932, the Milsons Point station was officially opened as part of the larger bridge opening celebrations to roadway, railway and pedestrian traffic by the then Premier, Jack Lang. As part of the construction of the Sydney Harbour Bridge and relocation of the North Shore Line to extend across the bridge into the city, a new Milsons Point station was built on the northern approach to the bridge and opened on 19 March 1932. This station was in two parts: two platforms each side of the roadway. The western platforms were connected to the North Shore line with the eastern pair used for a tramway service between Wynyard and the northern suburbs. The tramway and the associated platforms at Milsons Point were removed in 1958 as part of the conversions of lanes 7 and 8 of the Harbour Bridge to become the Cahill Expressway.

The station was upgraded and received a lift connecting the platform and underneath concourse at some point between July 1995 and September 1998.

== Description ==
=== Buildings ===
The complex comprises platform office and shelter (1932), platform faces (1932), subway entrances (1932), concourse (1932), walls and abutments (1932), and the Burton Street Underbridge (1932).

==== Platform office and platform (1932) ====
Platform structures include a platform office and shelter awnings over. The platform office retains timber double-hung sash windows. The island platform configuration is accessed via concrete stairs and a lift installed in 2006.

==== Entrances (1932) ====
The Alfred Street entrance retains its 1932 decorative awning and original light fittings either side. The Broughton Street awning has been replaced (date unknown) with a modern awning that extends over the entrances to shops that face Broughton Street. Above each entrance is fixed a cartouche with "1932" written on it.

==== Concourse (1932) ====
The concourse level includes station managers office, ticket and booking offices, amenities and a series of small shop outlets on the northern side. Access is via covered subway entrance ways in Alfred and Broughton streets. The stairs and walls of the concourse are tiled in cream-coloured ceramic tiles with maroon bands as top courses. The concourse includes a number of small shop fronts used for take away and small businesses, with shops facing Broughton Street. These were included in the original 1932 layout.

==== Walls and abutments (1932) ====
The external walls and abutments are finished in rendered concrete in keeping with the overall bridge design.

==== Burton Street Under-bridge (1932) ====
The south end of the Station group area includes the Burton Street Under-bridge 4.340 kilometres (2.697 mi), a high arch reinforced concrete underbridge constructed as part of the northern approaches to the Sydney Harbour Bridge and a similar design as the neighbouring Fitzroy Street Underbridge 4.250 kilometres (2.641 mi). The northern end is defined by the Lavender Street Underbridge. This is a reinforced concrete bridge with open spandrels. It is a unique design among the Sydney Harbour Bridge approach under-bridges. These underbridges are dealt with as individual items on separate listings

=== Condition ===
The station building, platform and under-bridge are in good condition. Some small cracks are visible in the external render around both the Alfred and the Broughton Street entrances. The Milsons Point Station group is largely intact and retains a high level of integrity.

=== Modifications and dates ===
- c. 1980s: Shop and entrance awnings replaced on Broughton Street side
- c. 2006: Platform elevator installed.
- N.d: Internal walls in the concourse, stairways and subway areas painted.

=== Further information ===
Historic photos of the station construction in 1932 indicate that the fasciae of the station platform shelter are original, as is the decorative awning for the Alfred Street entrance. Tiles are as specified in Bradfield's colour scheme for the city railway.

== Services ==
=== Platforms ===
| Platform | Line | Stopping pattern | Notes |
| 1 | North Shore & Western Line | Services to Penrith, Emu Plains & Richmond via Central & Strathfield | |
| 1 | Northern Line (Sydney) | Services to Epping & Hornsby via Central & Strathfield | |
| 1 | Central Coast & Newcastle Line | 6 Weekday Morning peak hour services to Sydney Central | |
| 2 | North Shore & Western Line | Services to Lindfield, Gordon, Hornsby & Berowra | |
| 2 | Northern Line (Sydney) | Services to Gordon | |
| 2 | Central Coast & Newcastle Line | 6 Weekday Evening peak hour services to Gosford & Wyong | |

=== Transport links ===
Busways operates five bus routes via Milsons Point station:

- 209: to East Lindfield
- 269: to McMahons Point wharf
- 286: to Denistone East (PM peak hour only)
- 287: to Ryde (PM peak hour only)
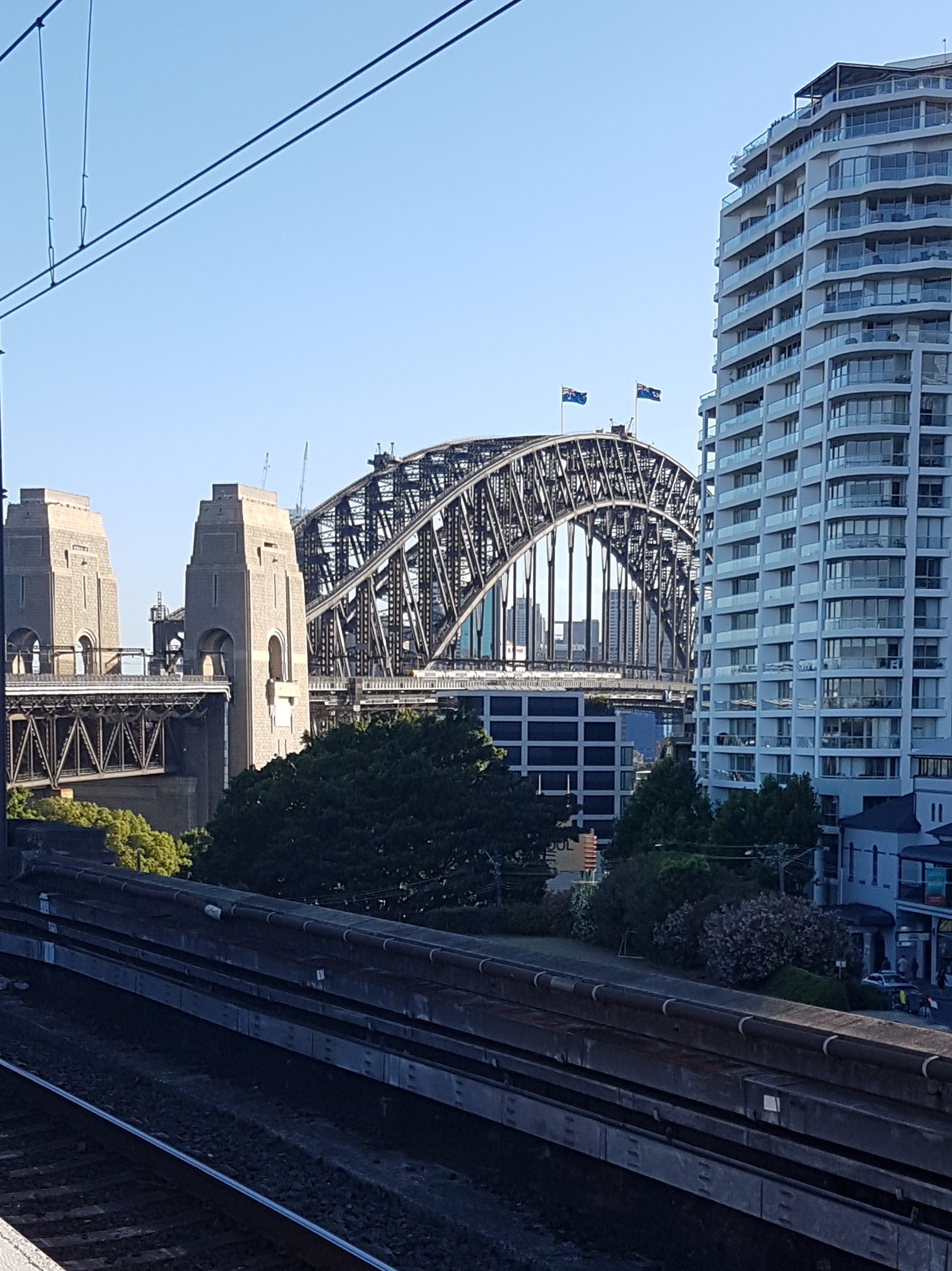
- View of the Sydney Harbour Bridge from platform 2 of Milsons Point Station
  290: to Epping

CDC NSW operates one weekday peak hour bus service from Milsons Point station:

- 622: to Dural via Cherrybrook

Keolis Downer Northern Beaches operates five bus routes via Milsons Point station:

- 150X: to Manly
- 154X: to Dee Why
- 228: to Clifton Gardens
- 229: to Beauty Point
- 230: to Mosman Bay wharf

== Heritage listing ==
As at 25 October 2010, Milsons Point station has state historical significance as an essential component of the northern approaches to the Sydney Harbour Bridge. The form and detail of the subway and tunnels in particular are significant as part of the overall design and specifications for the bridge as set down by Chief Engineer JJC Bradfield. The Milsons Point station retains a number of original features and decorative elements from its original construction phase including the platform building and entrance way awning from the Alfred Street side.

Milsons Point railway station was listed on the New South Wales State Heritage Register on 2 April 1999 having satisfied the following criteria.

The place is important in demonstrating the course, or pattern, of cultural or natural history in New South Wales.

Milsons Point Station has state historical significance as an essential component of the northern approaches of the Sydney Harbour Bridge and as a linking station in JJC Bradfield's city railway network. The station is unusual on the NSW system for being constructed by the specially created Sydney Harbour Bridge Branch of the Department of Public Works rather than NSW Government Railways.

The place has a strong or special association with a person, or group of persons, of importance of cultural or natural history of New South Wales's history.

Milsons Point Station is significant for its association with JJC Bradfield, chief engineer and designer for the Sydney Harbour Bridge and his wider Sydney Harbour Bridge and city railway network scheme.

The place is important in demonstrating aesthetic characteristics and/or a high degree of creative or technical achievement in New South Wales.

Milsons Point Station has aesthetic significance for its retention of the original design's decorative features such as the Alfred Street awning, Alfred Street light fittings and cream and maroon tiling on the platform access stairs. The use of reinforced concrete for the construction of the station building is an early example of this construction technique on a large scale.

The place has a strong or special association with a particular community or cultural group in New South Wales for social, cultural or spiritual reasons.

The place has the potential to contribute to the local community's sense of place and can provide a connection to the local community's history.

The place possesses uncommon, rare or endangered aspects of the cultural or natural history of New South Wales.

Milsons Point Station is the only intact station built as part of the construction of the Sydney Harbour Bridge. It retains original features of the 1932 design which have been completely removed from its sister station at North Sydney.

The place is important in demonstrating the principal characteristics of a class of cultural or natural places/environments in New South Wales.

Milsons Point Station is a representative externally of the Sydney Harbour Bridge architectural style and internally representative of the City Underground finishes as displayed in Museum and St James Stations.

== See also ==
- List of railway stations in Sydney
