= St Leonards railway station =

Railway station in Sydney, New South Wales, Australia

St Leonards
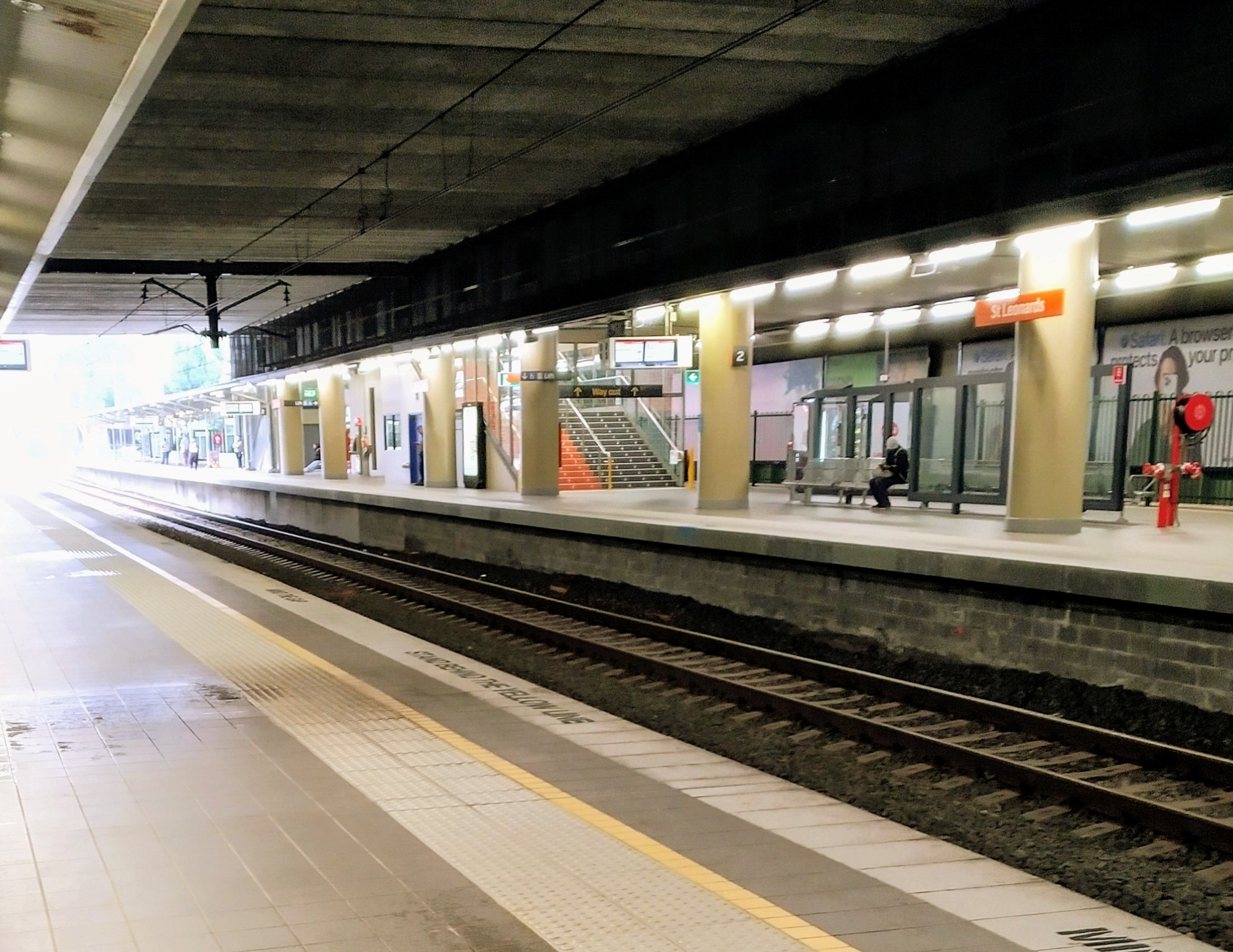
- View looking north from Platform 3, June 2024

General information
- Location: Pacific Highway, St Leonards, New South Wales; Australia
- Coordinates: 33°49′20″S 151°11′39″E
- Elevation: 90 metres (300 ft)
- Owner: Transport Asset Manager of New South Wales
- Operator: Sydney Trains
- Line: North Shore
- Distance: 8.41 km (5.23 mi) from Central
- Platforms: 2 (2 side)
- Tracks: 2
- Connections: Bus

Construction
- Structure type: Ground

Other information
- Status: Weekdays: Staffed: 6am–10pm: Weekends and public holidays: Staffed: 6am–10pm
- Station code: SNL
- Website: Transport for NSW

History
- Opened: 1 January 1890; 136 years ago
- Rebuilt: August 1989; February 2000
- Electrified: Yes; 1927

Passengers
- 2025: 5,620,959 (year); 15,400 (daily) (Sydney Trains)
- Rank: 28

Services
| Preceding station | Sydney Trains | Following station |
|---|---|---|
| Wollstonecraft towards Emu Plains or Richmond | North Shore & Western Line | Artarmon towards Berowra |
| Wollstonecraft via Strathfield towards Hornsby | Northern Line | Artarmon towards Gordon |
| Preceding station | Intercity Trains | Following station |
| Wollstonecraft towards Central | Central Coast & Newcastle Line (peak hour services) | Artarmon towards Wyong |
Location

St Leonards railway station is a suburban railway station located on the North Shore line, serving the Sydney suburb of St Leonards including the nearby Artarmon Industrial Area and Gore Hill. It is served by Sydney Trains T1 North Shore & Western Line and T9 Northern Line services and intercity Central Coast & Newcastle Line services.

== History ==
St Leonards station opened on 1 January 1890 as the terminus station of the North Shore line from Hornsby. On 1 May 1893, the line was extended south to Milsons Point.

In August 1989, the station was relocated to a temporary station south of the Pacific Highway to allow the site to be redeveloped. After the redevelopment encountered financial problems and remained dormant for a number of years, the new station was not completed until February 2000 as part of The Forum shopping plaza development.

The new station was built with two island platforms to allow extra lines to be laid as part of a plan to quadruple the line, which was never completed.

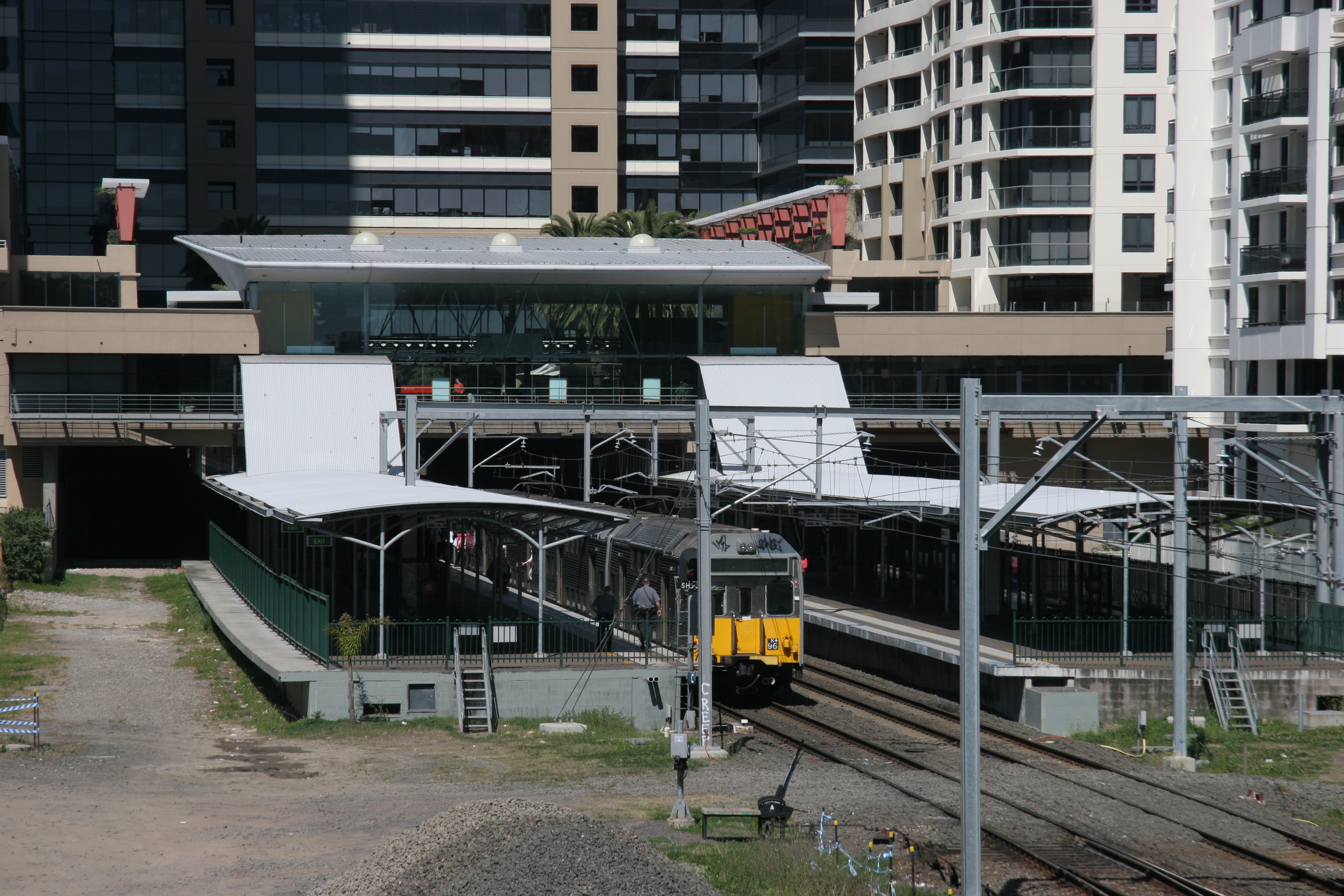
Southbound view of the station with the unused platform 1 closest to the left, September 2006

There is an unwired siding linked to the up track. It is equipped with catch points, and is 205m long (of which 168m is usable, enough to stable an 8-car suburban train). The points are manually operated by a lever next to the track. This also means the signals, which are controlled from Homebush Control Centre, cannot permit a movement to or from the siding. Additionally, as the points cannot be controlled by the signaller, any driver on the up track passing a signal at stop must proceed with caution, making sure there are no trains moving in or out of the siding. Although long enough for an 8 car suburban train, it is not electrified and generally used for track work vehicles on occasions.

== Services ==
=== Platforms ===
| Platform | Line | Stopping pattern | Notes |
| 2 | North Shore & Western Line | Services to Penrith, Emu Plains & Richmond via Central & Strathfield | |
| 2 | Northern Line (Sydney) | Services to Epping & Hornsby via Central & Strathfield | |
| 2 | Central Coast & Newcastle Line | 6 Morning peak hour services to Sydney Central | |
| 3 | North Shore & Western Line | Services to Lindfield, Gordon, Hornsby & Berowra | |
| 3 | Northern Line (Sydney) | Services to Gordon | |
| 3 | Central Coast & Newcastle Line | 6 Evening peak hour services to Gosford & Wyong via Gordon & Hornsby | |

=== Transport links ===
Busways operates eight bus routes via St Leonards station, under contract to Transport for NSW:

- 119: North Sydney to Gore Hill
- 252: North Sydney to Gladesville
- 254: McMahons Point wharf to Riverview
- 265: North Sydney to Lane Cove
- 286: Milsons Point to Denistone East (peak hours only)
- 287: Milsons Point to Ryde (peak hours only)
- 290: City Erskine St to Epping
- 291: McMahons Point wharf to Epping

CDC NSW operates two bus routes via St Leonards station, under contract to Transport for NSW (all peak hours only):

- 612X: Milsons Point to Riley T-way
- 622: Milsons Point to Dural

Keolis Downer Northern Beaches operates two bus routes via St Leonards station, under contract to Transport for NSW:

- 114: Balmoral to Royal North Shore Hospital
- 144: Manly to Chatswood station

St Leonards station is served by two NightRide routes:

- N90: Hornsby station to Town Hall station
- N91: Macquarie Park station to Town Hall
