= Milsons Point (Lavender Bay sites) railway stations =

Former railway station in Sydney, Australia

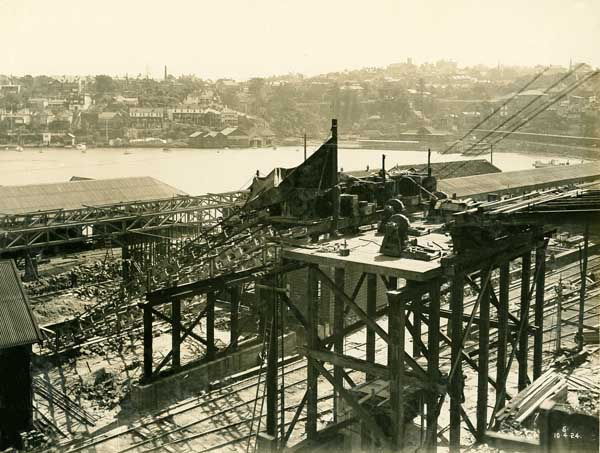
The second Lavender Bay railway station, under construction in 1924

The first Lavender Bay railway station was opened on 30 May 1915 at a site 300 metres north of the original Milsons Point station on the North Shore line on the edge of Lavender Bay. The station was created by building platforms beside the existing lines. An overbridge was constructed leading to a new ferry wharf. Southbound trains used to drop their passengers at Lavender Bay station and then proceed to Milsons Point railway station to reverse.

Passengers discovered that it was easier to stay on the train until it reached Milsons Point and then alight. The walk from Milsons Point platforms was almost level because it was a terminal station. The ferry company was also unhappy about servicing two wharves. On 18 July 1915, after a mere seven weeks, the service reverted to Milsons Point station.

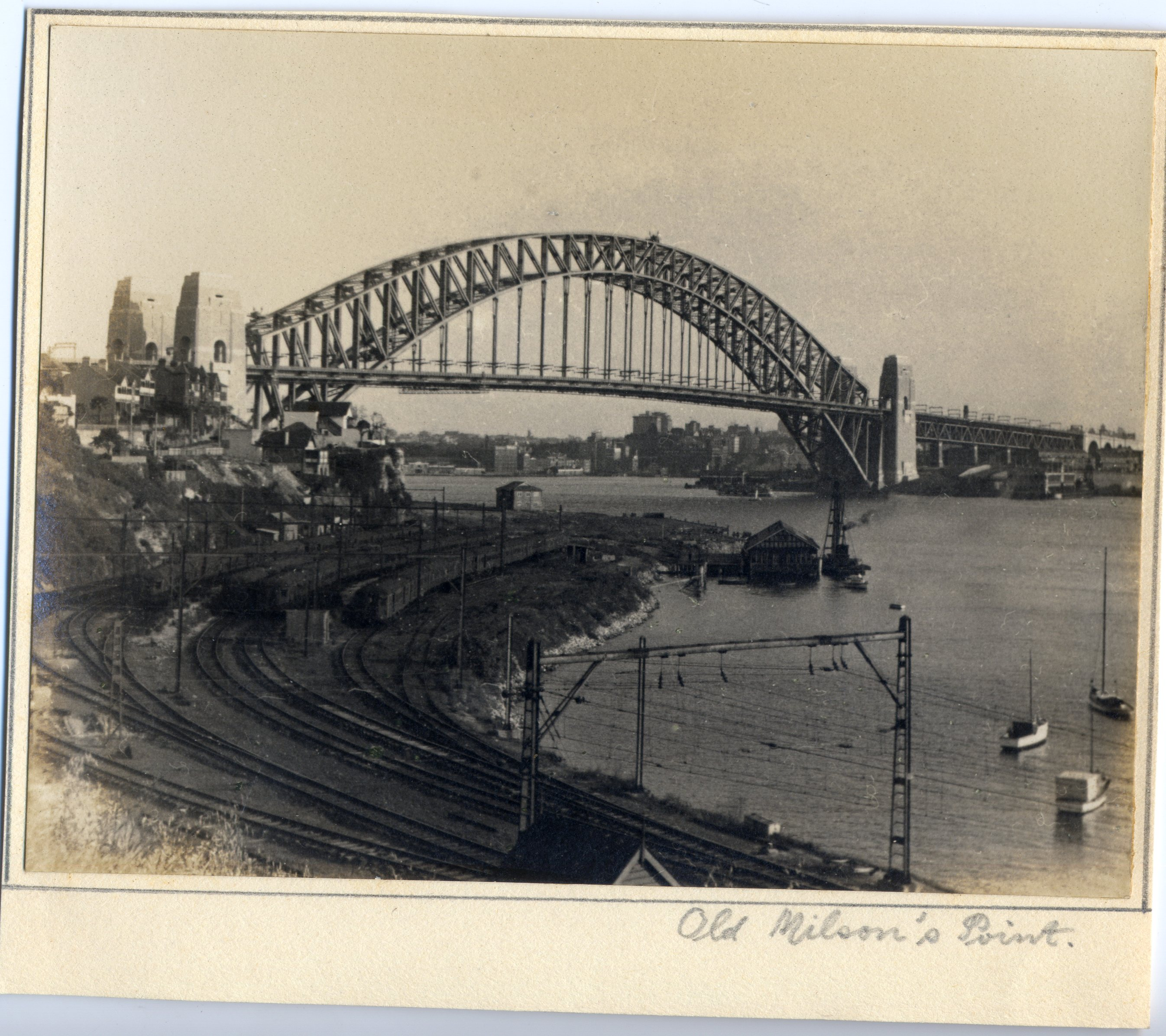
The site after the completion of the Harbour Bridge

The second Lavender Bay Station was a redesign of the first station, and came into use on 27 April 1924. This station was necessary because a contract had been let for the construction of the Sydney Harbour Bridge and the Milsons Point land was required for workshops associated with the construction. The second Lavender Bay station was a terminus as the lines to Milsons Point were actually removed. Thus it was a more passenger-friendly version of its predecessor. The electric tram terminus was also moved to Glen Street on the cliff above the station. Lifts and escalators, the first in Australia, were installed.

After the Sydney Harbour Bridge opened on 19 March 1932, North Shore line services were diverted to the new stations at North Sydney and Milsons Point and onward over the bridge into the city. Ferry services were greatly reduced and rail services ceased to Lavender Bay. The station became the "North Sydney Car Sidings", with the track used for storage of rolling stock between the morning and afternoon peak periods.
