= North Shore railway line =

Railway line in Australia

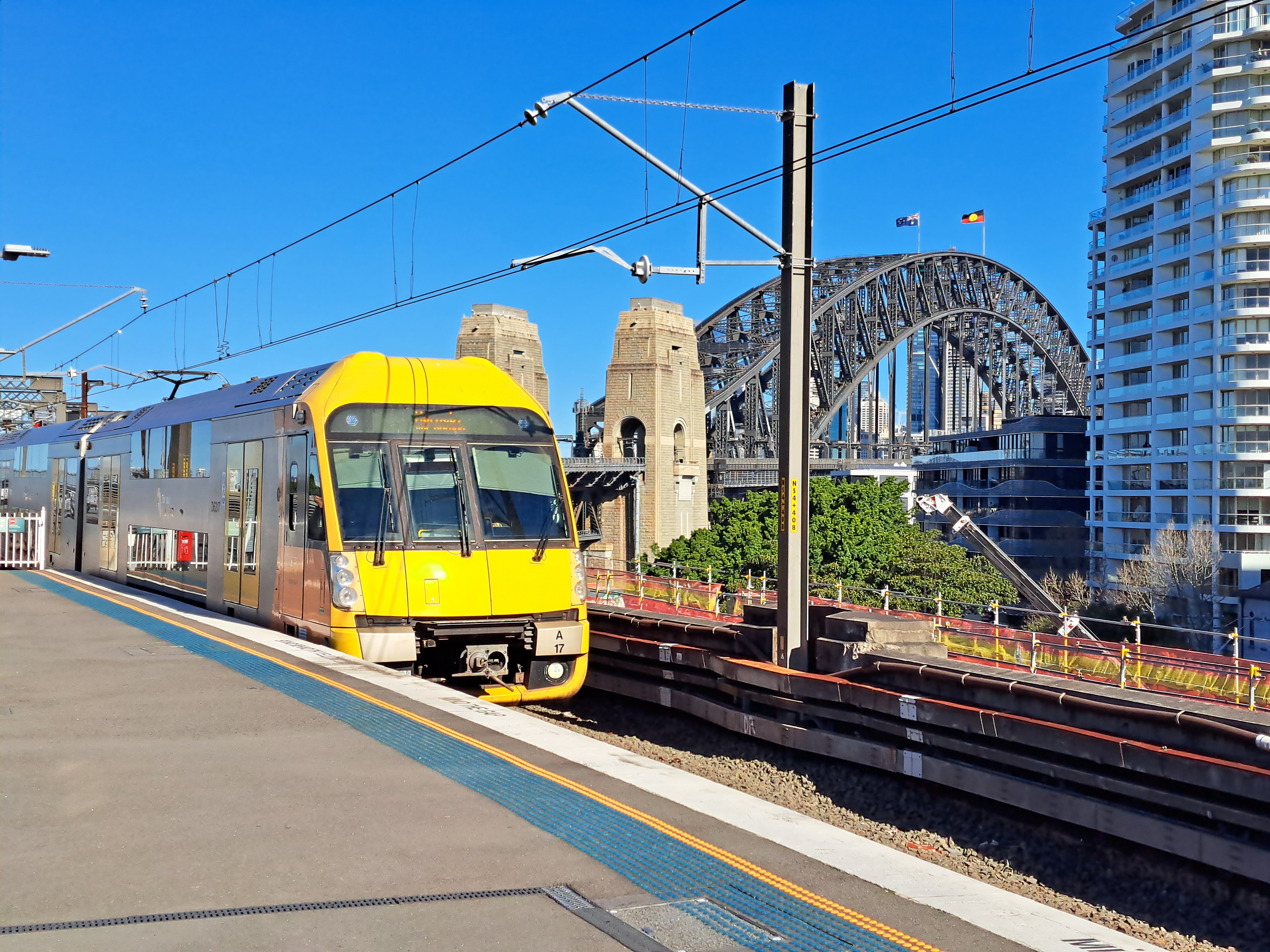
- A Waratah A set at Milsons Point.

Overview
- Termini: Central; Hornsby
- Stations: 20

Technical
- Line length: 25
- Track gauge: 1,435 mm (4 ft 8 1/2 in) standard gauge
- Electrification: 1,500 V DC overhead catenary

The North Shore railway line is a railway line serving the North Shore in Sydney, New South Wales, Australia. The North Shore line extends from Sydney Central station through the western limb of the City Circle, across the Sydney Harbour Bridge and through the North Shore area to Hornsby where it joins the Main North Line. Services on the line are primarily provided by the T1 North Shore & Western Line and T9 Northern Line, with some services to Wyong during peak hours.

== History ==
A train travels through Lavender Bay on the original alignment between Milsons Point and Waverton

As early as 1874, people dreamed of a railway in the North Shore. In that year, a petition was made for a line from Pearce's Corner (Wahroonga) to Sydney Harbour. When one local was approached, he said: "If I live to be as old as Methuselah, I will never see a railway". In 1875, a committee was formed at the Greengate Hotel (Killara). The Public Works Department was opposed, saying "either then or now, the line would run from nowhere to nowhere". In 1879, surveyors proved that a line between Pearce's Corner and Blue's Point was practical. In September of that year, the records of that survey were destroyed in the Garden Palace fire. In that year, Sir Henry Parkes tried to win votes in St Leonards by advocating a railway line and Harbour Bridge. There was much controversy where the line should terminate, and didn't go ahead. In 1884, it was proposed that a new line to Falcon Street (Crows Nest) would be built, and tenders were called, but the first accepted tenderers, Morton and Hardy, withdrew, and eventually the tender of E. Pritchard and Co. was accepted, and the line terminated at the present St Leonards station.

Completed in May 1889, the North Shore Line was opened on 1 January 1890 as a single track between Hornsby and St Leonards. No Sunday service was given until the line was extended to the Sydney Harbour foreshore at Milsons Point on 1 May 1893. Transport between this original Milsons Point station and central Sydney was by ferry boat.

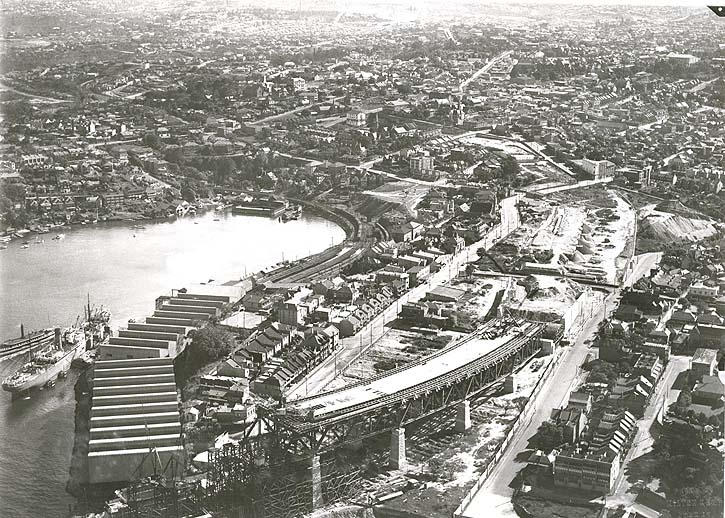
Aerial view of construction of the northern approach to the Sydney Harbour Bridge. The original railway alignment and construction work on the realignment for extension across the bridge can both be seen.

In the meantime agitation and preparation for the extension of the line to the harbour went on, and in a Parliamentary debate it was stated by Bruce Smith, Minister for Public Works: "The North Shore was peculiarly adapted for the establishment of fresh suburbs as the climate was exceptionally favourable, and if only means of communication was afforded, a large population would spring up there." Dibbs doubted its commercial value, said the work was farcical, and would be a sham and a failure. The Parliamentary Standing Committee on Public Works in 1889 did not report favourably on the scheme for extension to Milsons Point, but in 1890 an amended scheme was approved. Tenders for the construction to Milsons Point were let in April 1891, to O. McMaster, but the line was not opened till 1 May 1893. A passenger on the first train from the Point says those on board struck matches in the Lavender Bay tunnel, and a banquet was held in a marquee at Turramurra, where the Hillview now stands.

New intermediate stations were built at Waitara (20 May 1895), Warrawee (1 August 1900), Killara (10 July 1899), and Artarmon (6 July 1898). As early as 1901, a station was called for Beechworth Road (Pymble), but the Railway Commissioner at the time said that "the movement is slightly premature" and was never built. Most of the North Shore line was duplicated between 1900 and 1909. In 1927 the line was converted to electric operation using a 1500 volt DC, overhead supply. The construction works for the Sydney Harbour Bridge necessitated truncation of the southern terminus from Milsons Point to Lavender Bay.

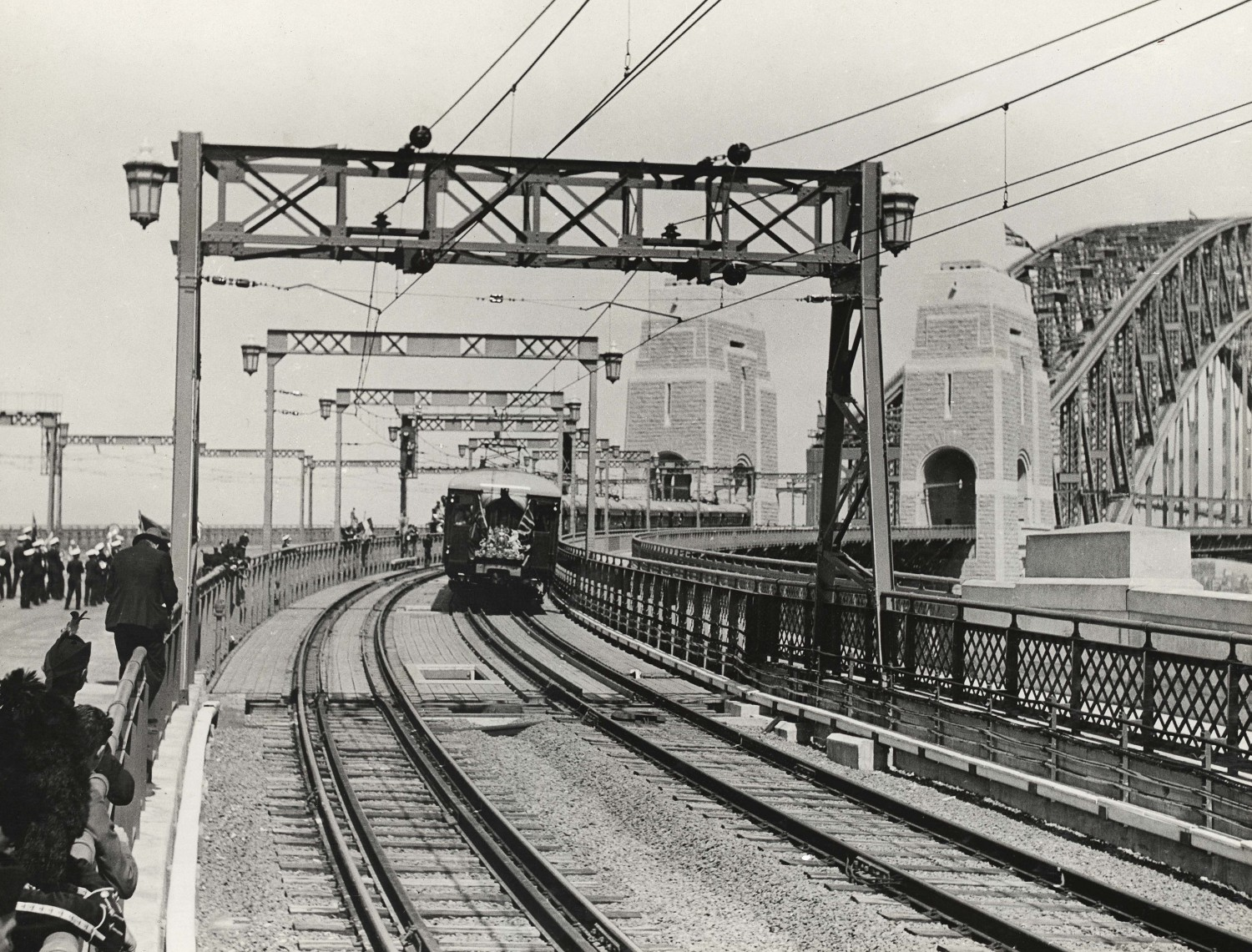
First passenger train crossing the Sydney Harbour bridge, 19 March 1932

When the Sydney Harbour Bridge was opened on 19 March 1932 a new Milsons Point station (on the bridge approach) came into operation and the North Shore Line was extended through it and over the Sydney Harbour Bridge to link with the underground lines of central Sydney. The result is that the two ends of the North Shore Line link to the Sydney railway system at Central and Hornsby.

After 1932 the original Lavender Bay station became a storage depot for electric trains, and the line connecting Lavender Bay to the North Shore line was reduced to single track. This line joins the current North Shore line at Waverton station.

In 2009, a second connection to the Main Northern line was added with the opening to the Epping to Chatswood railway line. This connecting line was removed and incorporated into the Sydney Metro in 2019.

The North Shore Line is now a major commuter artery between the North Shore and central Sydney. In early years, Old Milsons Point, Bay Road, St Leonards, Chatswood, Lindfield, Gordon, Pymble, Turramurra, Wahroonga and Hornsby stations had goods yards. All but St Leonards, Chatswood and Hornsby yards had disappeared by mid-twentieth century, and the latter three did not survive into the late twentieth century.

== Route ==
The North Shore line officially starts at Central, with a junction with the Main Suburban line south of the Flying Junctions. The line runs through Central, then goes underground alongside the City Circle, with stations at Town Hall and Wynyard. There is a crossover north of Wynyard allowing southbound trains to terminate when there is trackwork in the City Circle. After Wynyard, the line emerges onto the western side of the Sydney Harbour Bridge. On the other side of the bridge is Milsons Point station. The line continues for a short distance to North Sydney station, which has 4 platforms. The outer two tracks are for through services, while the inner two tracks are loop lines for terminating trains.

After North Sydney, the line snakes its way through Sydney's lower North Shore, passing Waverton, Wollstonecraft, St Leonards and Artamon stations. At Waverton is the small junction with the Lavender Bay line, providing access to Lavender Bay/North Sydney Sidings. This section of line also has the sharpest curve on Sydney's suburban network, at Wollstonecraft of 10 chains (200 m). At Chatswood, there are 4 platforms, with the inner two used by Sydney Metro Northwest and formerly to enter the Epping to Chatswood rail link.

The line continues up the North Shore region, with stations at Roseville, Lindfield, Killara, Gordon, Pymble, Turramurra, Warrawee, Wahroonga and Waitara. Lindfield has an additional bay platform in the centre, used to terminate trains from the south. A similar arrangement exists at Gordon, where the centre platform is connected to a loop line that can terminate trains in both directions. After Waitara, the line proceeds to Hornsby, where there is a junction with the Main Northern Line and Hornsby Maintenance Centre.

== See also ==
- Railways in Sydney
