= Canley Vale railway station =

Railway station in Sydney, New South Wales, Australia

Canley Vale
- Northbound view of the platforms in September 2018

General information
- Location: Railway Parade, Canley Vale; Sydney, New South Wales; Australia
- Coordinates: 33°53′13″S 150°56′37″E
- Elevation: 14 metres (46 ft)
- Owner: Transport Asset Manager of NSW
- Operator: Sydney Trains
- Line: Main Southern
- Distance: 30.98 km (19.25 mi) from Central
- Platforms: 2 (2 side)
- Tracks: 2
- Connections: Bus

Construction
- Structure type: Ground
- Accessible: Yes

Other information
- Status: Weekdays: Staffed: 6am to 7pm: Weekends and public holidays: Staffed: 8am to 4pm
- Station code: CVE
- Website: Transport for NSW

History
- Opened: 15 April 1878 (148 years ago)
- Electrified: Yes (from 1930)

Passengers
- 2025: 1,236,801 (year); 3,388 (daily) (Sydney Trains)
- Rank: 113

Services
Preceding station	Sydney Trains	Following station
Cabramatta towards Leppington	Leppington & Inner West Line	Fairfield towards City Circle
Cabramatta towards Leppington	Cumberland Line	Fairfield towards Richmond
Location

Canley Vale railway station is a suburban railway station located on the Main Southern line, serving the Sydney suburb of Canley Vale. It is served by Sydney Trains T2 Leppington & Inner West Line and T5 Cumberland Line services.

== History ==
Canley Vale station opened in April 1878. Canley Vale station is included in Transport for NSW's Transport Access Program which will see lifts built onto the current footbridge, toilets, an upgraded station entrance and improvements to CCTV, wayfinding and lighting. The upgrade to Canley Vale was complete in November 2021 and included new lifts and a kiss-and-ride feature.

== Services ==
=== Platforms ===
Platform	Line	Stopping pattern	Notes
1	T2	services to Central & the City Circle	
1	T5	services to Blacktown, Schofields and Richmond	
2	T2	services to Leppington	
2	T5	services to Leppington weekend services to Liverpool	

=== Transport links ===
Transit Systems operates one bus route via Canley Vale station, under contract to Transport for NSW:

- 817: Cabramatta station and Fairfield station

Canley Vale station is served by one NightRide route:

- N50: Liverpool station to Town Hall station
