= Warwick Farm railway station =

Railway station in Sydney, New South Wales, Australia

Warwick Farm
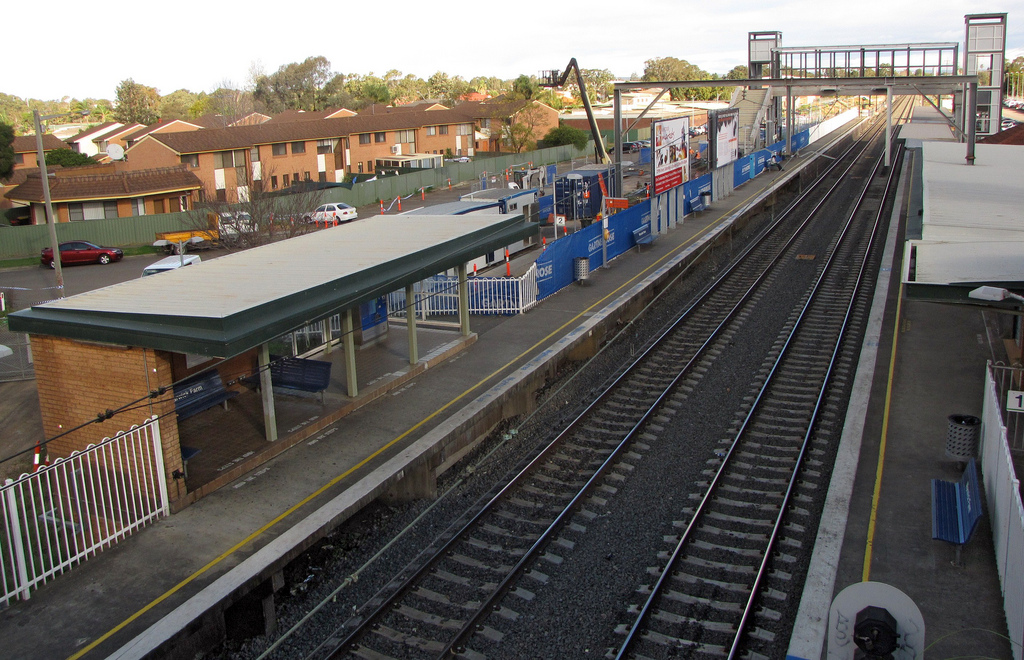
- Southbound view of station platforms in August 2010

General information
- Location: Remembrance Drive, Warwick Farm; Sydney, New South Wales; Australia
- Coordinates: 33°54′48″S 150°56′06″E
- Elevation: 10 metres (33 ft)
- Owner: Transport Asset Manager of NSW
- Operator: Sydney Trains
- Line: Main Southern
- Distance: 28.43 km (17.67 mi) from Central
- Platforms: 2 (2 side)
- Tracks: 3
- Connections: Bus

Construction
- Structure type: Ground
- Accessible: Yes

Other information
- Status: Weekdays: Staffed: 6am to 7pm: Weekends and public holidays: Staffed: 8am to 4pm
- Station code: WKF
- Website: Transport for NSW

History
- Opened: 18 March 1889 (137 years ago)
- Rebuilt: 1943 (83 years ago)
- Electrified: Yes (from 1930)

Passengers
- 2023: 1,198,680 (year); 3,284 (daily) (Sydney Trains, NSW TrainLink)

Services
Preceding station	Sydney Trains	Following station
Liverpool towards Leppington	T2 Leppington & Inner West Line	Cabramatta towards City Circle
Liverpool Terminus	T3 Liverpool & Inner West Line	Cabramatta towards City Circle
Liverpool towards Leppington	T5 Cumberland Line	Cabramatta towards Richmond
Location

Warwick Farm railway station is a suburban railway station located on the Main Southern line, serving Warwick Farm, a suburb of Sydney, Australia. It is served by Sydney Trains T2 Leppington & Inner West Line, T3 Liverpool & Inner West Line and T5 Cumberland Line services.

== History ==
The original Warwick Farm station opened on 18 March 1889 as a private platform for William Forrester near the former level crossing on the Hume Highway. It was relocated to its present location in 1943 when nearby Warwick Farm Racecourse was used as a military camp.

Previously, a 1.6-kilometre branch line to Warwick Farm Racecourse branched off from the Main South line north of the station, and carried special racecourse trains on race days. The branch opened in June 1889, closed in August 1990 and was removed in December 1991.

The Southern Sydney Freight Line opened immediately to the east of the station in January 2013. As part of its construction, a footbridge with lifts and stairs was constructed. Previously, crossing the railway line required passengers to use the Hume Highway bridge. Platform 2 was very narrow and was widened during the works.

The station briefly received national attention in April 2024 after an unusual incident where a thoroughbred wandered onto the station platform. It was one of four escaped racehorses from a Warwick Farm stable complex, who were released by an unknown person. The horses were recaptured and returned to their stables shortly after.

=== 2026 train fire ===
On 15 April 2026, at 4:45 pm AEDT (UTC+10), a freight train's roof caught fire near Warwick Farm station during the peak hour. Firefighting services were rushed to the scene while train services running between Fairfield and Liverpool on the T2 and T5, and services on the T3 between Villawood and Liverpool, were shut down and halted, with some services cancelled.

== Services ==
=== Platforms ===
Platform	Line	Stopping pattern	Notes
1	T2 Leppington & Inner West Line	services to Central & the City Circle via Granville	
1	T3 Liverpool & Inner West Line	services to Central & the City Circle via Regents Park	
1	T5 Cumberland Line	services to Blacktown, Schofields and Richmond	
2	T2 Leppington & Inner West Line	services to Leppington	
2	T3 Liverpool & Inner West Line	services to Liverpool	
2	T5 Cumberland Line	services to Leppington weekend services to Liverpool	

=== Transport links ===
Transit Systems NSW operates one bus route via Warwick Farm station, under contract to Transport for NSW:

- 904: Fairfield station to Liverpool station

Warwick Farm station is served by one NightRide route:

- N50: Liverpool station to Town Hall station
