= Cabramatta railway station =

Railway station in Sydney, New South Wales, Australia

Cabramatta
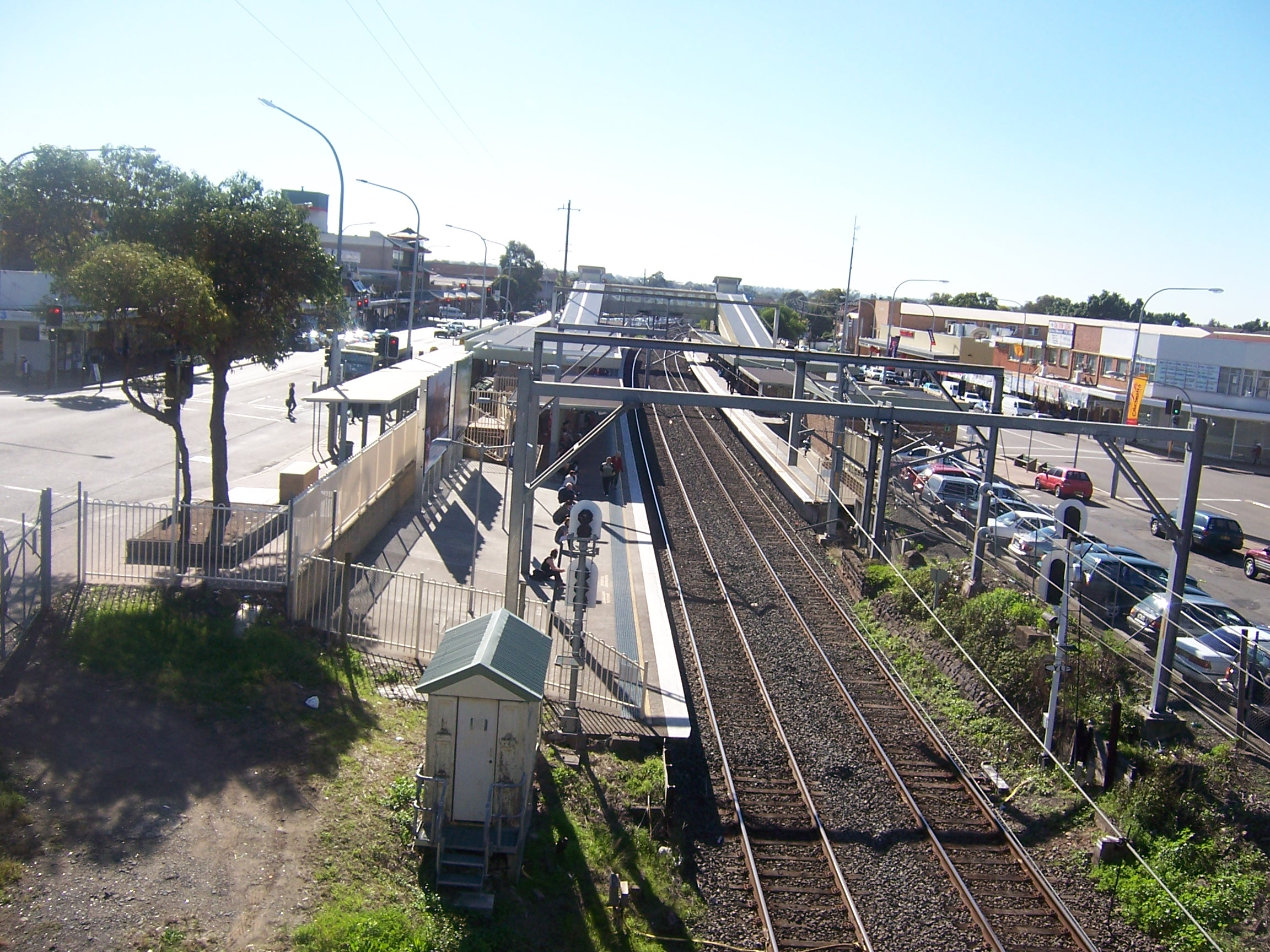
- Northbound view of the station in April 2008, prior to the Southern Sydney Freight Line being added to the right

General information
- Location: Railway Parade, Cabramatta; Sydney, New South Wales; Australia
- Coordinates: 33°53′42″S 150°56′20″E
- Elevation: 20 metres (66 ft)
- Owner: Transport Asset Manager of NSW
- Operator: Sydney Trains
- Line: Main Southern
- Distance: 31.98 km (19.87 mi) from Central
- Platforms: 2 (2 side)
- Tracks: 3
- Connections: Bus

Construction
- Structure type: Ground
- Accessible: Yes

Other information
- Status: Staffed
- Station code: CAB
- Website: Transport for NSW

History
- Opened: 1870 (156 years ago)
- Electrified: Yes (from 1930)

Passengers
- 2025: 4,250,243 (year); 11,645 (daily) (Sydney Trains)
- Rank: 41

Services
Preceding station	Sydney Trains	Following station
Warwick Farm towards Leppington	T2 Leppington & Inner West Line	Canley Vale towards City Circle
Warwick Farm towards Liverpool	T3 Liverpool & Inner West Line	Carramar towards City Circle
Warwick Farm towards Leppington	T5 Cumberland Line	Canley Vale towards Richmond
Former services
Preceding station	Former services	Following station
Warwick Farm Racecourse Terminus	Warwick Farm Racecourse Line (1889–1977, 1979–1990)	Terminus
Location

Cabramatta railway station is a suburban railway station located on the Main Southern line, serving the Sydney suburb of Cabramatta. It is served by Sydney Trains T2 Leppington & Inner West Line, T3 Liverpool & Inner West Line and T5 Cumberland Line services.

== History ==
Cabramatta station opened in 1870 on the Granville to Liverpool section of the Main South line. On 8 October 1924, Cabramatta line became a junction station when another branch of the Main Southern line opened from Sefton, joining the existing line just north of the station.

In April 1996, the junction was upgraded from a low speed one with an 80 km/h (49.7 mph) speed limit. To make the higher speeds possible, the track centres have been widened from 4 m (13.12 ft) at the platforms to about 12 m (39.37 ft) at the diamond crossing at the heart of the junction. Longer points were installed.

The station received lifts as part of an easy access upgrade in 2004.

As part of the Southern Sydney Freight Line project, a third line was built behind the eastern side of the station. Due to limited space, an overhead concourse was constructed to replace a building on platform 2. The new concourse opened in 2011, the line in December 2013.

== Services ==
=== Platforms ===
Platform	Line	Stopping pattern	Notes
1	T2 Leppington & Inner West Line	services to Central & the City Circle via Granville	
1	T3 Liverpool & Inner West Line	services to Central & the City Circle via Regents Park	
1	T5 Cumberland Line	services to Blacktown, Schofields and Richmond	
2	T2 Leppington & Inner West Line	services to Leppington	
2	T3 Liverpool & Inner West Line	services to Liverpool	
2	T5 Cumberland Line	services to Leppington weekend services to Liverpool	

=== Transport links ===
Transit Systems operates five bus routes via Cabramatta station, under contract to Transport for NSW:

- 805: to Liverpool station
- 807: to Cecil Park
- 815: to Mount Pritchard
- 816: to Greenfield Park
- 817: to Fairfield station

Cabramatta station is served by one NightRide route:

- N50: Liverpool station to Town Hall station
