= Wynyard railway station, Sydney =

Heritage-listed railway station in Sydney, New South Wales, Australia

Wynyard
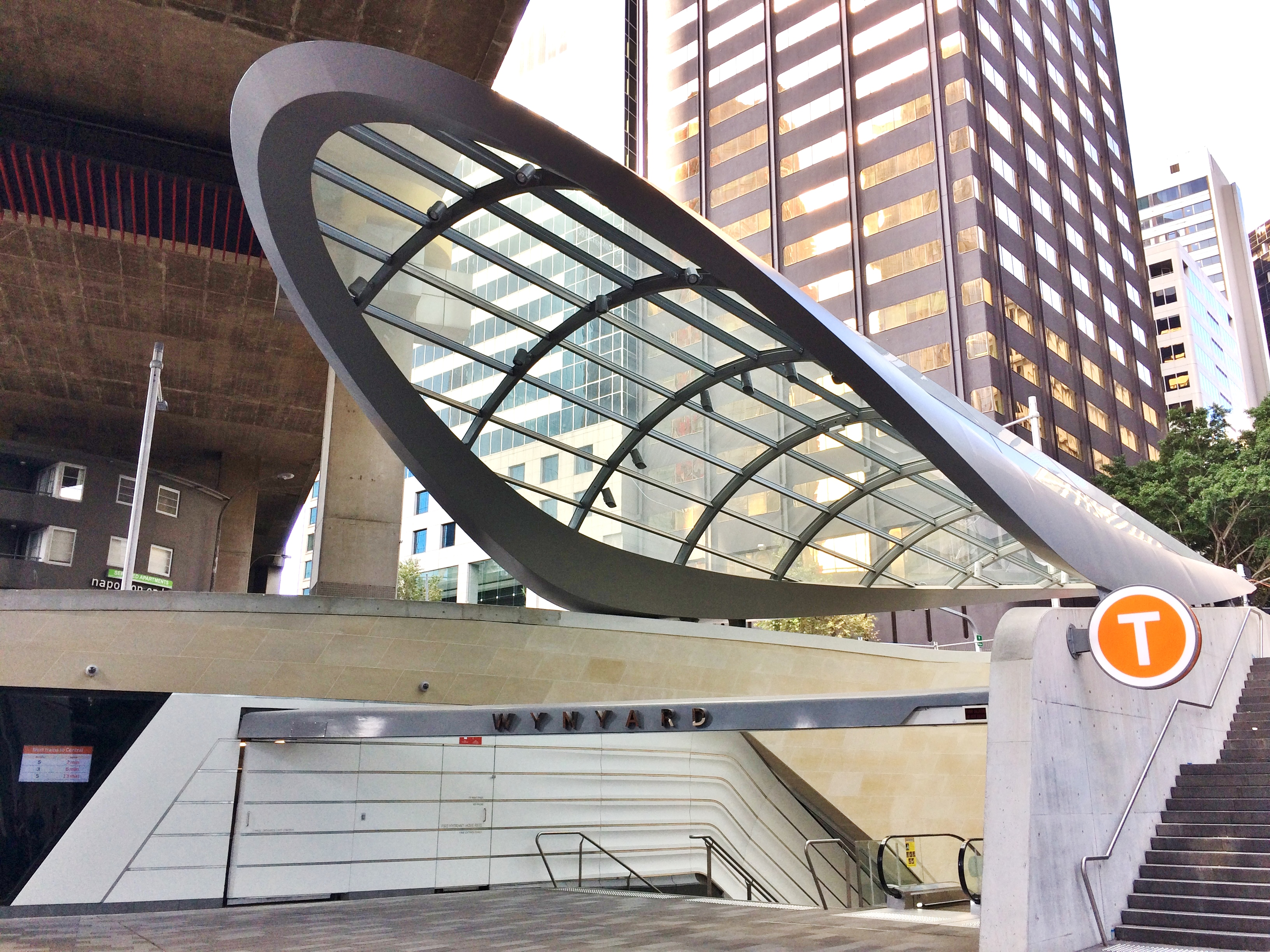
- Wynyard Walk entrance, April 2017

General information
- Location: York Street, Sydney, New South Wales, Australia
- Coordinates: 33°51′57″S 151°12′20″E
- Owner: New South Wales Government via Transport Asset Manager of New South Wales
- Operator: Sydney Trains
- Line: City Circle
- Distance: 2.05 km (1.27 mi) from Central (clockwise)
- Platforms: 4 (2 island)
- Tracks: 4
- Connections: Bus; Barangaroo; Wynyard; Barangaroo

Construction
- Structure type: Underground
- Platform levels: 2
- Accessible: Yes
- Architect: John Bradfield (designer)

Other information
- Status: Staffed

History
- Opened: 28 February 1932

Passengers
- 2023: 33,502,020 (year); 91,786 (daily) (Sydney Trains, NSW TrainLink)

Services
Preceding station	Sydney Trains	Following station
Town Hall towards Emu Plains or Richmond	North Shore & Western Line	Milsons Point towards Berowra
Town Hall towards Parramatta or Leppington	Leppington & Inner West Line	Circular Quay as the Airport & South Line towards Macarthur or Revesby
Town Hall towards Liverpool	Liverpool & Inner West Line clockwise only	Circular Quay towards City Circle
Town Hall as the Inner West & Leppington Line towards Parramatta or Leppington	Airport & South Line	Circular Quay towards Macarthur or Revesby
Town Hall via Strathfield towards Hornsby	Northern Line	Milsons Point towards Gordon
Preceding station	Intercity Trains	Following station
Milsons Point towards Gosford or Wyong	Central Coast & Newcastle Line (peak hour services)	Town Hall towards Central
Route map
- City Circle route map
Location

Wynyard railway station (/ˈwɪnjərd/) is a heritage-listed underground commuter rail station located in the north-west precinct of the Sydney central business district, in New South Wales, Australia. The station opened on 28 February 1932 to coincide with the opening of the Sydney Harbour Bridge.

== History ==
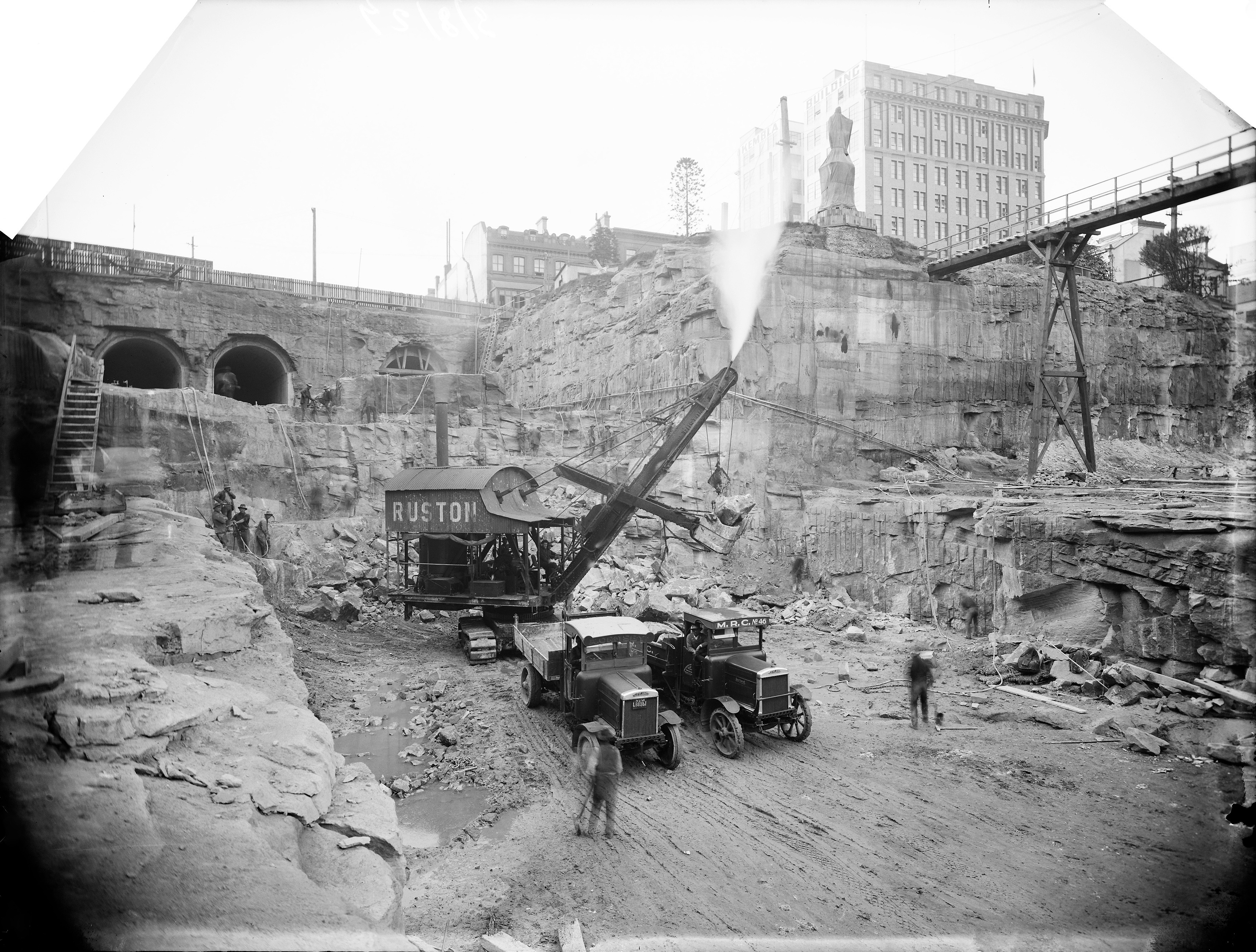
Building Sydney Rail Network, c. 1926, Arthur Ernest Foster

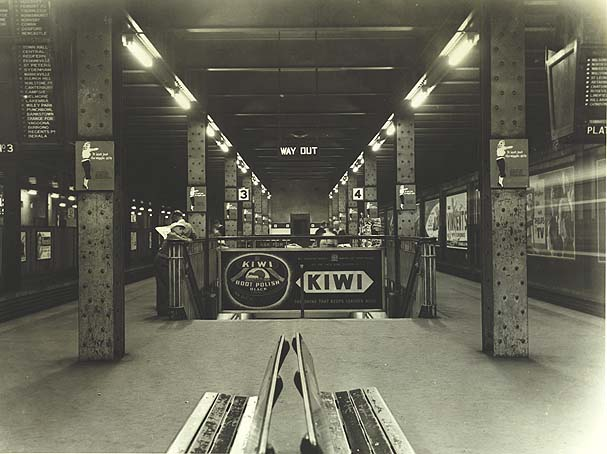
Wynyard railway station, 1940s

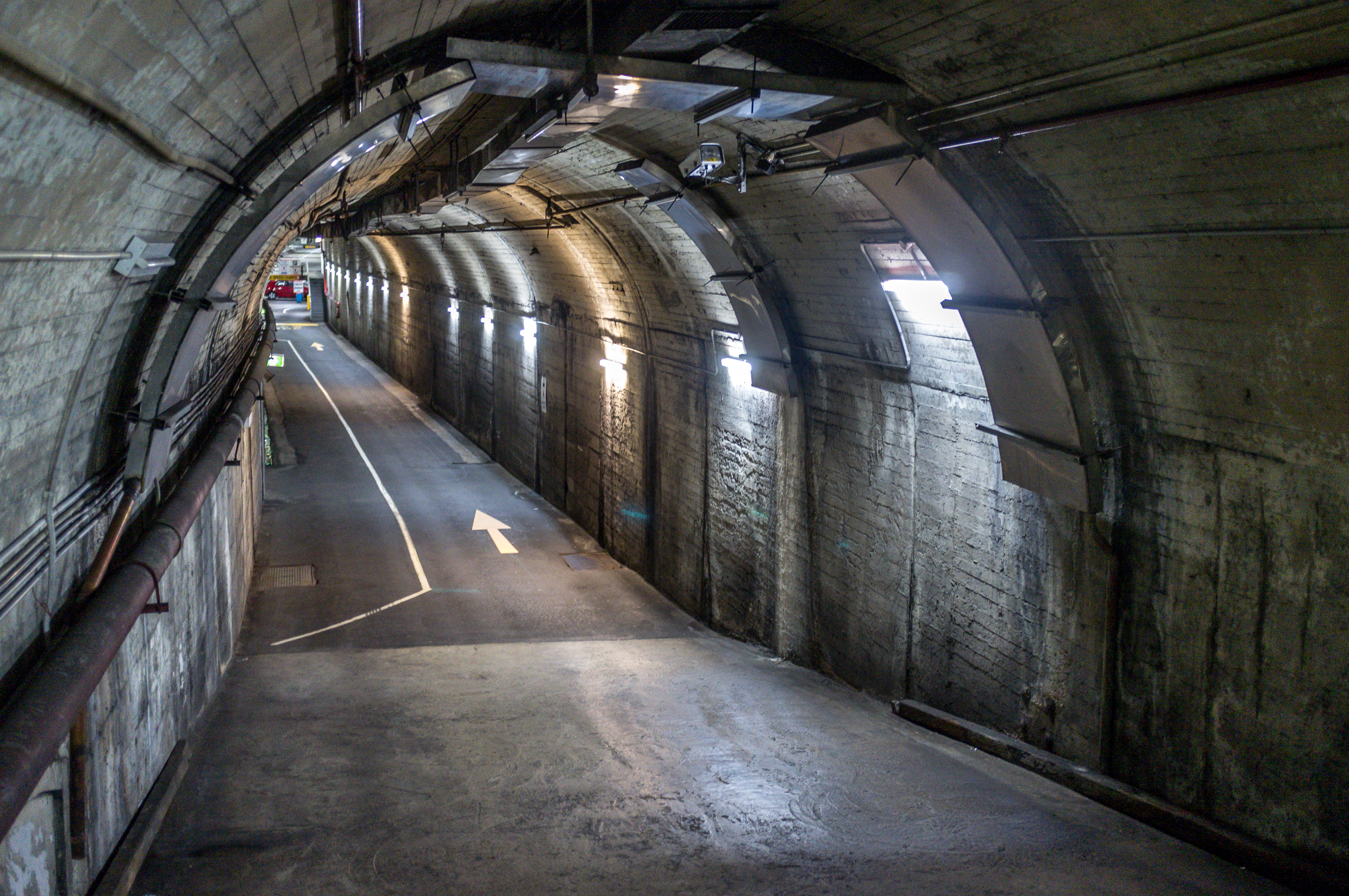
Former tram tunnels leading to disused platforms 1 and 2

The station opened on 28 February 1932. Wynyard was originally constructed with six platforms (the existing four platforms are still numbered from 3 to 6), with platforms 1–4 located on the upper level and platforms 5 and 6 on the lower level. The original intention was that platforms 1 and 2, located adjacent to platforms 3 and 4, would eventually serve the eastern pair of railway tracks across the Harbour Bridge for a proposed railway line to the Northern Beaches. In the interim, with construction yet to begin on the Northern Beaches line due to lack of funds, they were used as a terminus for North Shore tram services on Sydney's tram network, operating from the bridge's opening in 1932 until 1958. A feature of these lines was Australia's only underground tram terminus. On 22 January 1956, the lines from platforms 5 and 6 were extended to Circular Quay as part of the City Circle.

In 1999, along with Town Hall, the station received an easy access upgrade which included lifts to each island platform. The station was extensively refurbished in 2016, with Wynyard Walk, a pedestrian-only tunnel, being officially opened on 20 November 2016.

=== Former tram tunnels ===
Following the closure of the North Shore tram lines, in 1958 the tracks were lifted from platforms 1 and 2. Later, the platforms were walled off from 3 and 4 and part of the space converted into an underground car park for the Menzies Hotel. The tunnels were accessed from Wynyard Lane where a descending ramp was cut west under Wynyard Park to the disused platforms. The Wynyard Lane Car Park was closed in October 2016 to make way for the mixed-use Wynyard Place development which would obstruct the entrance ramp to the tunnels.

The remainder of the tunnels north of the car park exit were walled off as were the northern portals on the Harbour Bridge. North of the portals, two additional road lanes were built above the old tramway as part of the Cahill Expressway. The disused tunnels and ramp that formerly connected the station to the eastern tram tracks can still be seen from the pedestrian path along the east side of the bridge, mirroring those still in use to the west of the bridge.

== Station configuration ==
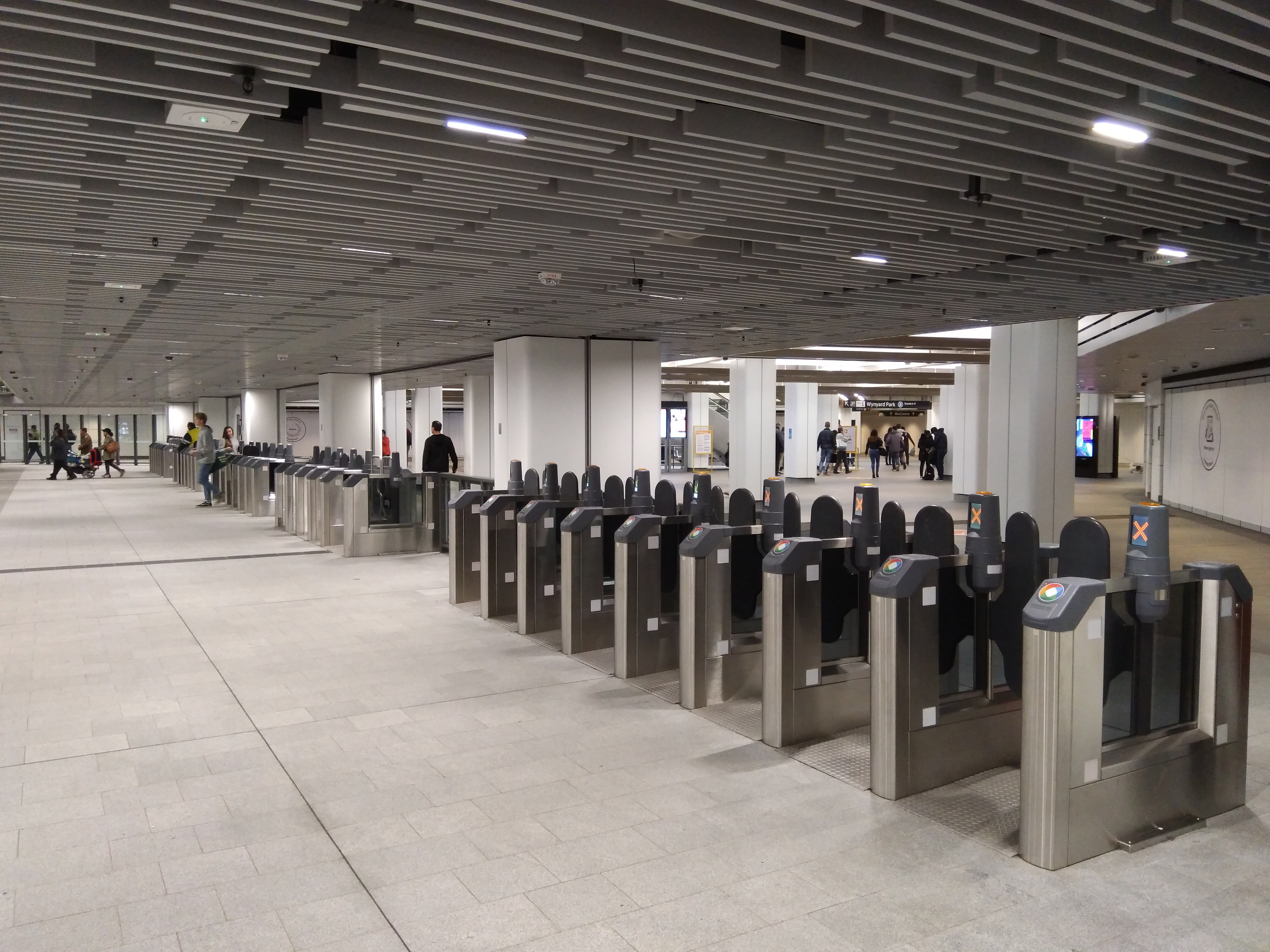
Ticket barriers on the eastern side of the concourse

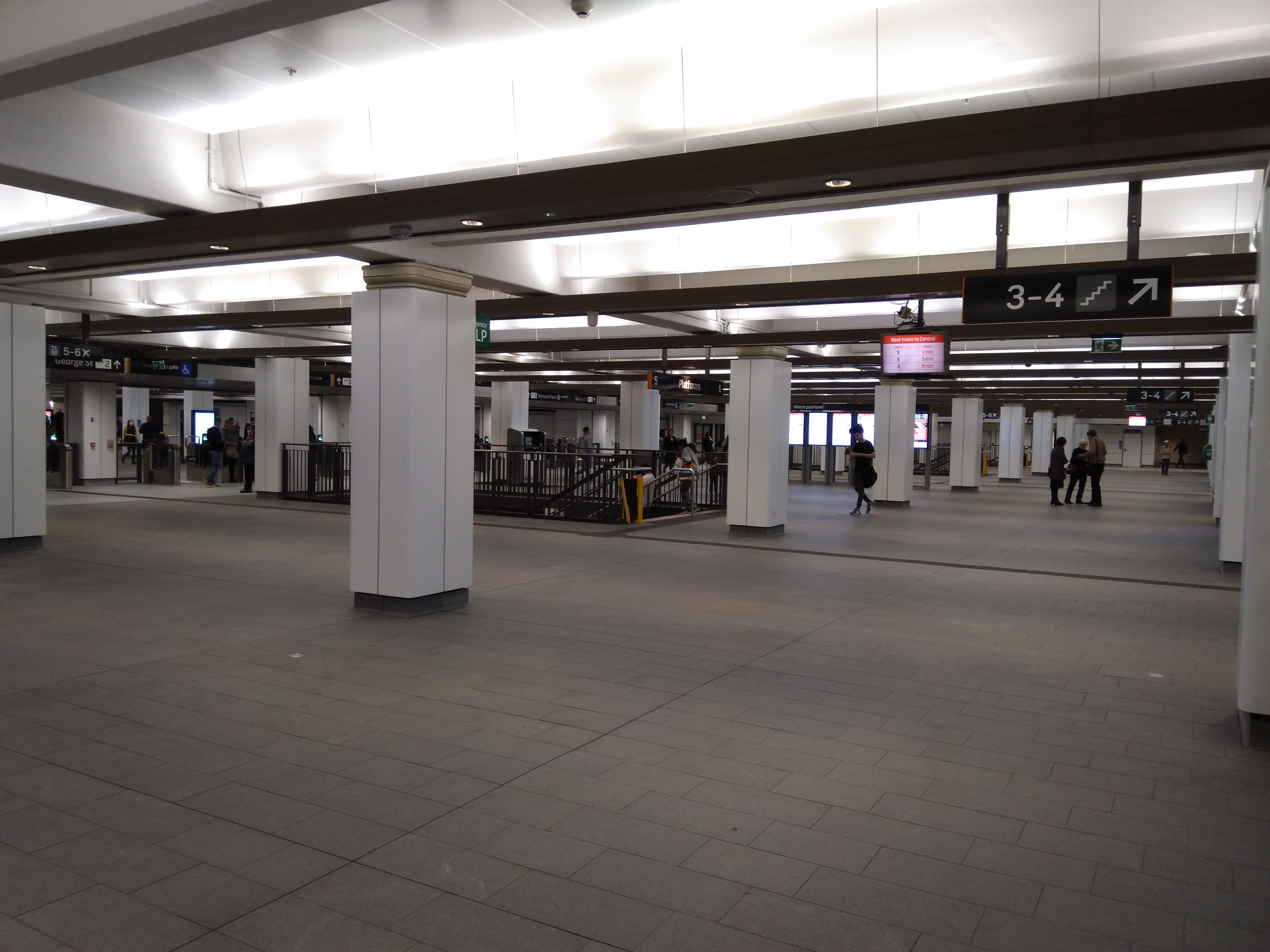
Station concourse

Wynyard station currently has two levels, each with two platforms. The upper level serves the North Shore line, whilst the lower level serves lines traversing the City Circle. Both lines run south under York Street from Wynyard to Town Hall. There is no connection between the rails of these two lines at Wynyard.

The passenger concourse is on an intermediate level between the upper and lower platforms. Wynyard is connected via underground passageways to several surrounding buildings and shopping arcades and is located immediately below Wynyard Park. Direct access via tunnels is possible to George, Hunter and Pitt Streets. Escalators connect the station concourse with York Street (emerging underneath Transport House) and Carrington Street (under Wynyard Park).

=== Refurbishment ===
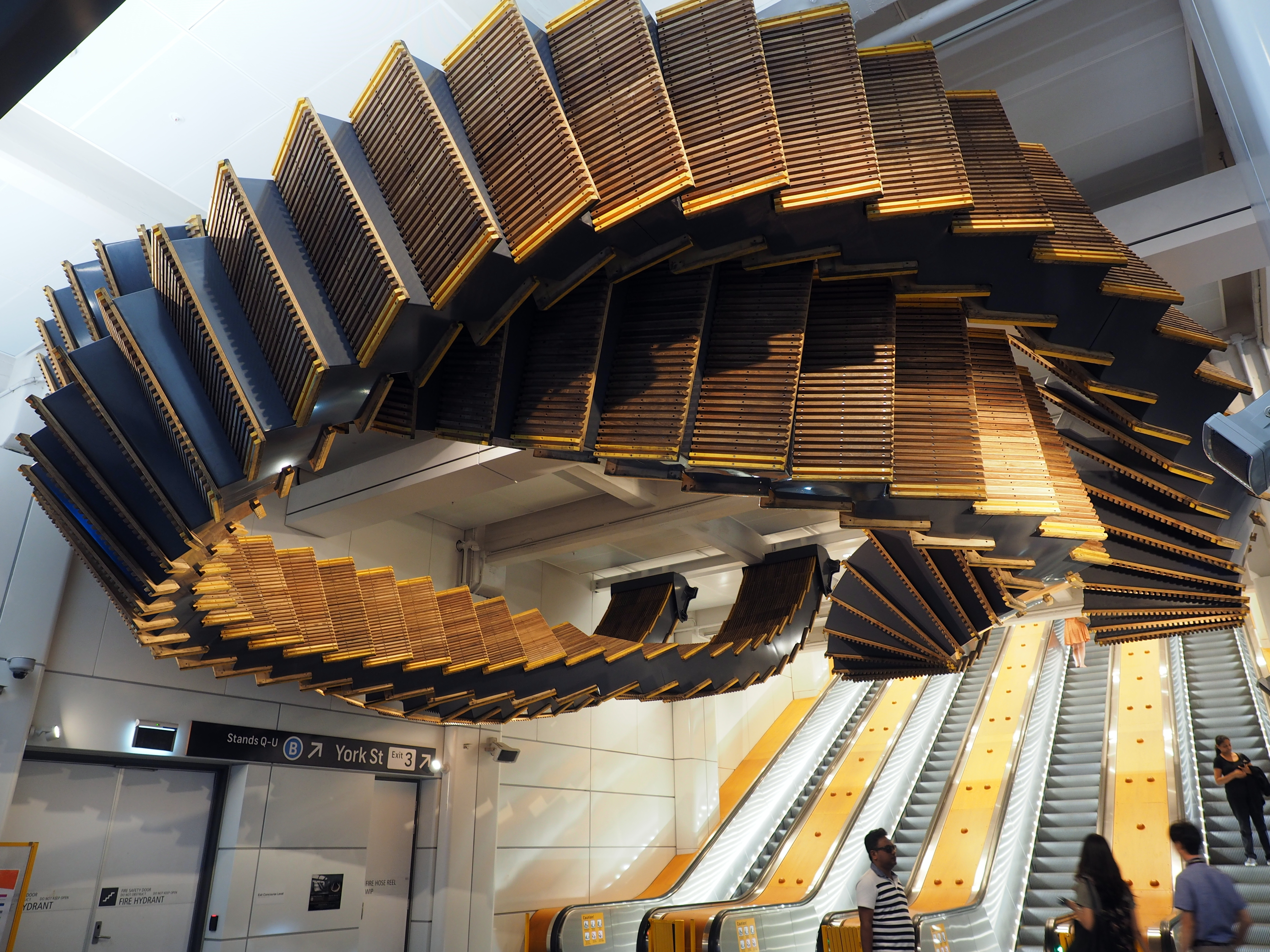
'Interloop' sculpture 2017

Commencing in 2015, the platforms and concourse were thoroughly refurbished with new flooring and ceilings as well as an extra stairway to platforms 3 and 4 and the addition of more ticket barriers. The four wooden escalators underneath Transport House, which had been operational since the opening of the station, were replaced with modern escalators. Parts of the former escalators were repurposed into a ceiling-mounted artwork titled 'Interloop', which was installed at the York Street entrance to the station concourse. The refurbishment was completed in 2018.

=== Brookfield Place ===
Above Wynyard Station, Brookfield Properties has created a mixed-use scheme of offices, retail and leisure in one new block that rises out of the reconfigured transit hall of Wynyard Station. The design team of Make Architects and Architectus assembled four separate sites including the former Menzies Hotel, Thakral House, and the retained Shell House and Beneficial House, and merged them into one reinvigorated block, which has been named Brookfield Place Sydney – a name the developer reserves for their premium international developments. The George and Carrington Street entrances to Wynyard Station have been greatly expanded to allow for greater access to the railway concourse but also to the buildings above and the new retail levels at street level and below. The development provides a new, street level pedestrian route from George Street through to Carrington Street and Wynyard Park beyond.

=== Wynyard Walk ===
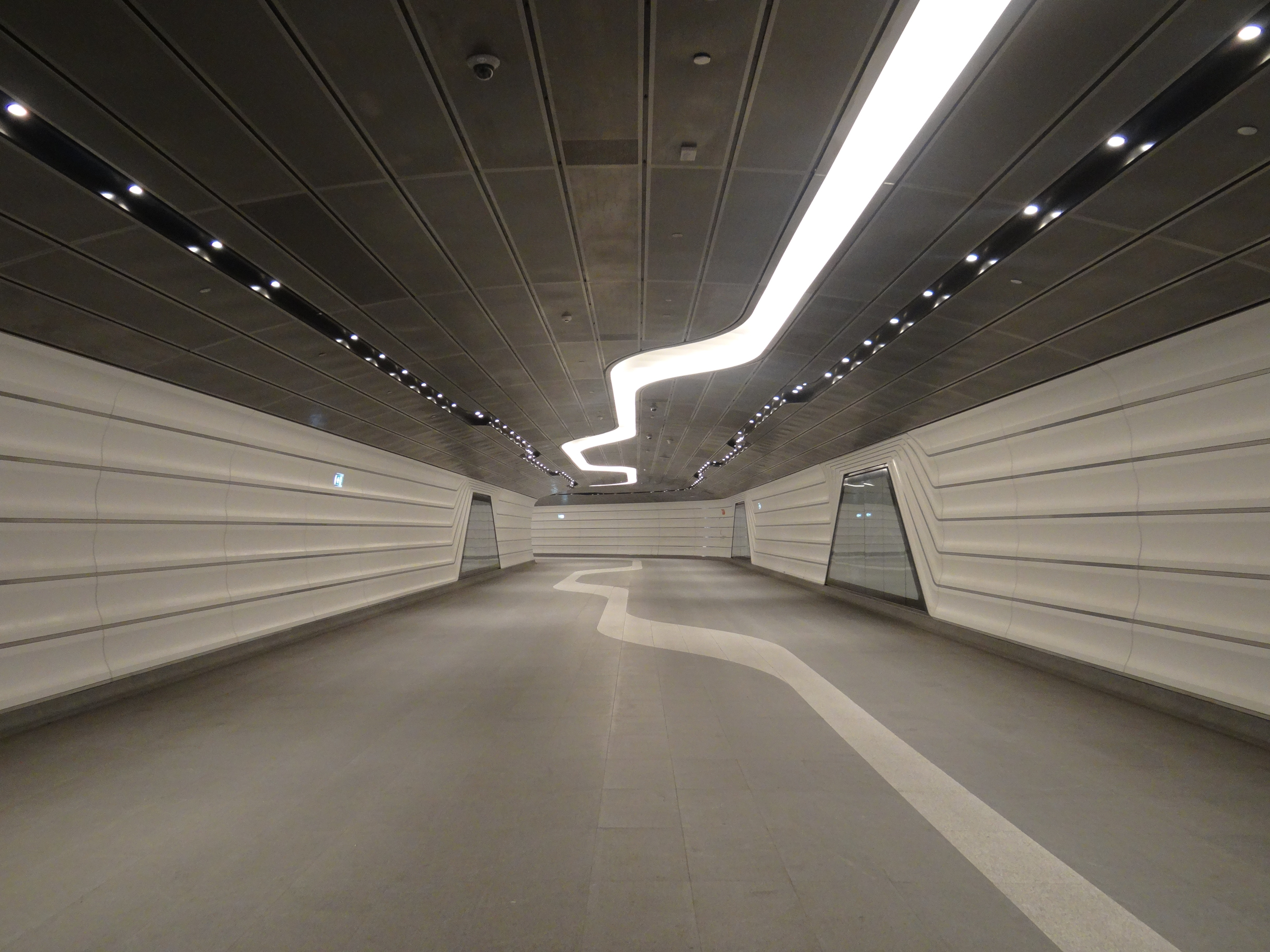
Wynyard Walk

The Wynyard Walk is a 180-metre-long (590 ft) pedestrian link and tunnel between Wynyard station and Barangaroo that opened in September 2016, with a Clarence Street entrance that opened in December 2016. Based on a design by architecture firm Woods Bagot, the project combined a new entrance, a pedestrian tunnel, a pedestrian bridge, and a new pedestrian plaza. Wynyard Walk provides direct access via tunnels to Clarence, Kent and Sussex streets. Wynyard Walk features a huge video screen showcasing digital art.

== Platforms and services ==
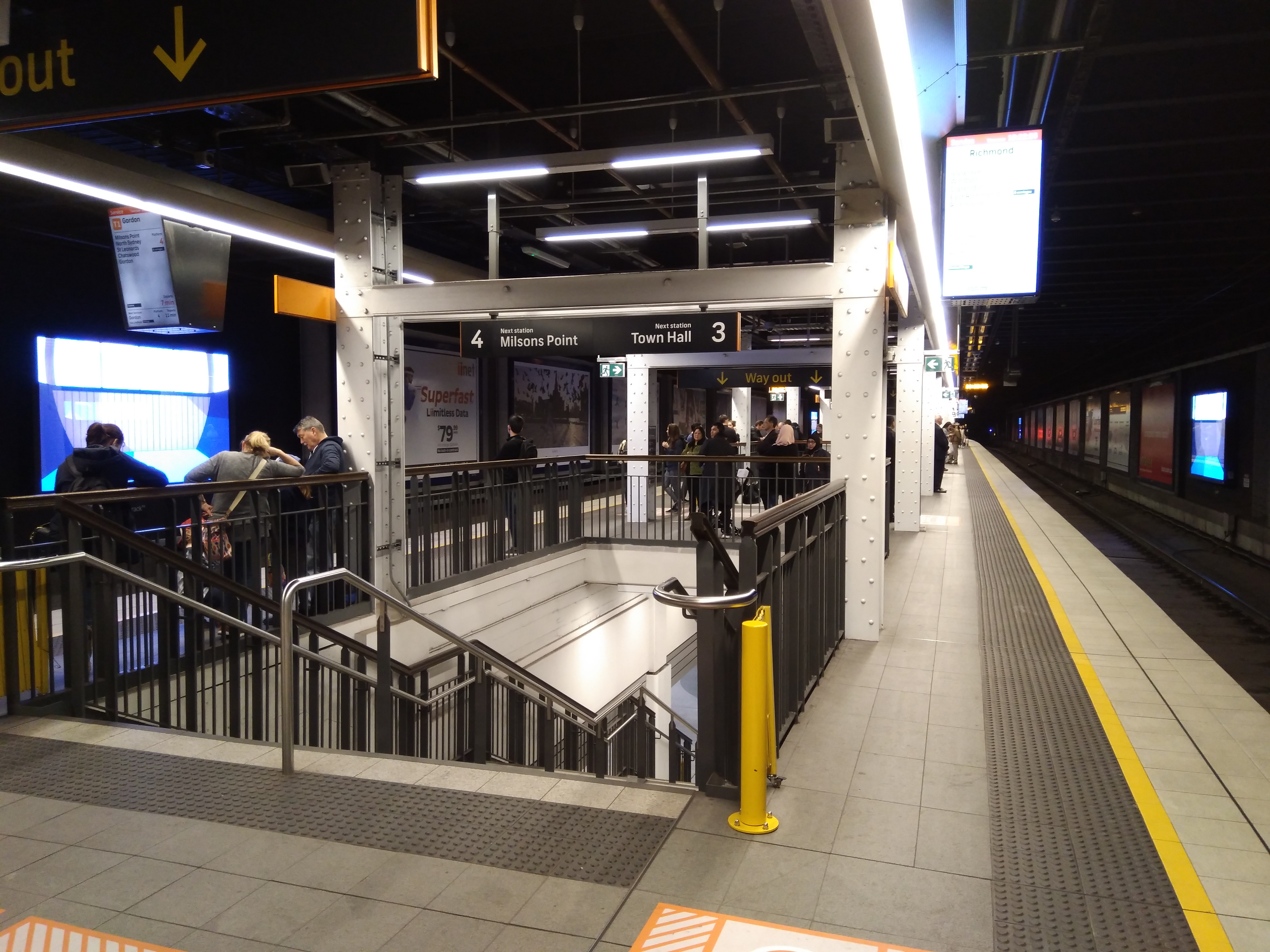
Upper-level platforms 3 and 4

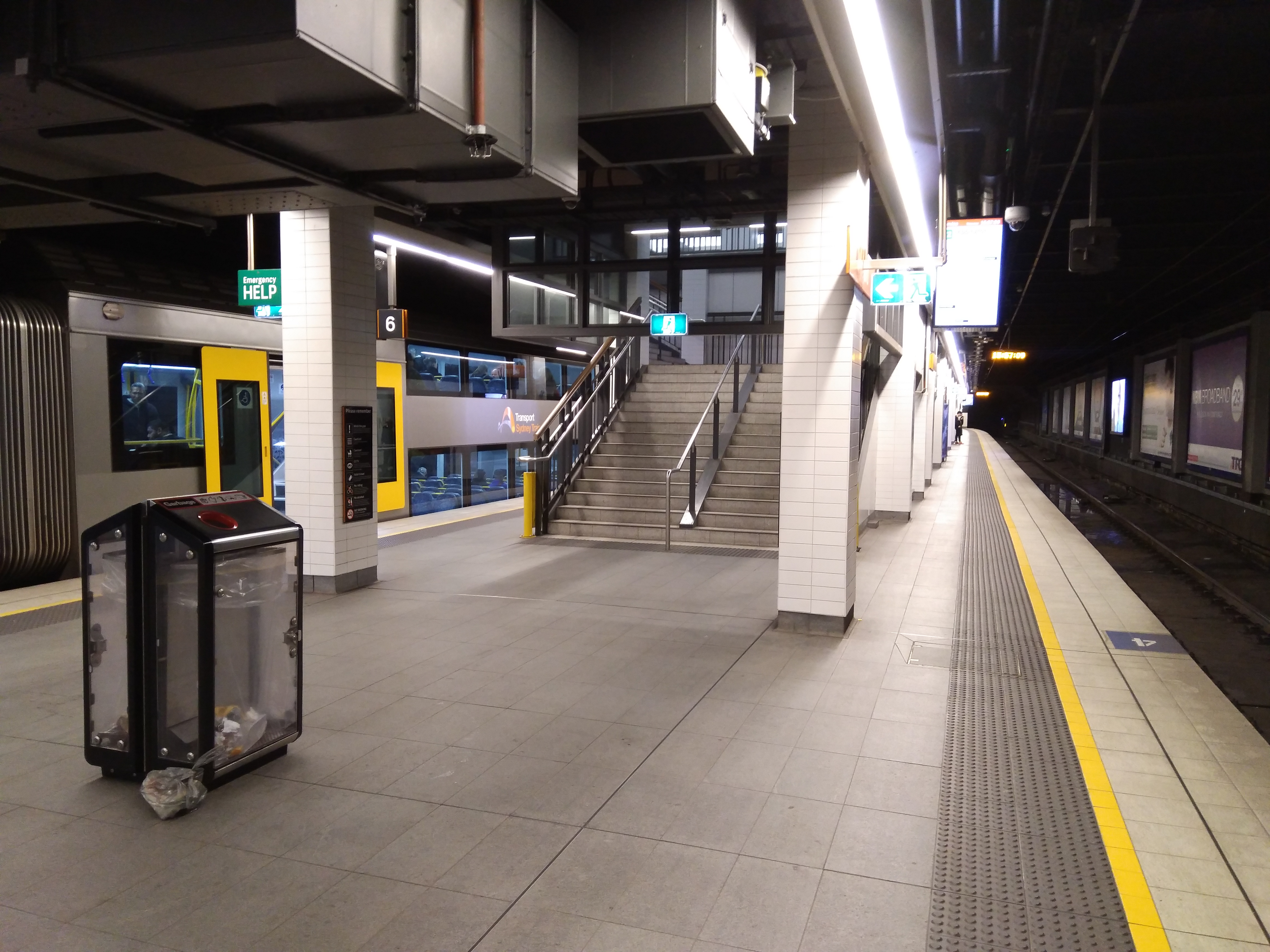
Lower-level platforms 5 and 6

Platform	Line	Stopping pattern	Notes
1		Former tram platform, not in use	
2		Former tram platform, not in use	
3	T1	Services to Penrith, Emu Plains & Richmond via Central & Strathfield	
3	T9	Services to Epping & Hornsby via Central & Strathfield	
3	CCN	6 Weekday Morning peak hour services to Sydney Central	
4	T1	Services to Lindfield, Gordon, Hornsby & Berowra	
4	T9	Services to Gordon	
4	CCN	6 Weekday Evening peak hour services to Gosford & Wyong via Gordon	
5	T2	Services to Homebush, Parramatta & Leppington	
5	T3	Services to Liverpool via Lidcombe and Regents Park	
6	T8	Services to Sydenham; 2 weekday evening services to Campbelltown	
6	T8	Services to Revesby & Macarthur via Airport stations	

== Transport links ==
=== Light rail services ===
East of the railway station on George Street is the Wynyard light rail stop, which is the serviced by the L2 Randwick and L3 Kingsford lines.

Line	Destinations	Notes
L2	Circular Quay & Randwick	
L3	Circular Quay & Kingsford	

=== Bus services ===
Wynyard station is served by bus routes operated by Busways, CDC NSW, Transdev and Transit Systems, under contract to Transport for NSW.

Stand A, Carrington St:

- 170: weekend service to Manly Wharf via Military Rd & Spit Bridge
- 178: to Cromer Heights
- 243: to Spit Junction
- 244: to Chowder Bay
- 245: to Balmoral
- 246: to Balmoral Heights
- 247: to Mosman Junction (late night services to Taronga Zoo)
- 249: to Beauty Point

Stand B, Carrington St:

- B1: to Mona Vale

Stand C, Carrington St

- 151: to Mona Vale via Manly (late night service)
- 180: to Collaroy Plateau
- 180X: to Collaroy Plateau Express
- 183X: PM peak service to North Narrabeen
- 185X: PM peak service to Mona Vale via Warriewood Valley
- 188: to Avalon (late night service)
- 188X: PM peak service to North Avalon
- 189X: PM peak service to Avalon
- 190X: to Palm Beach Express

Stand D, Carrington St:

- 166X: PM peak service to Allambie Heights
- 176X: PM peak service to Dee Why via North Curl Curl
- 177X: PM peak service to Dee Why via Wingala
- 178: to Cromer Heights
- 178X: PM peak service to Cromer Heights
- 179X: PM peak service to Wheeler Heights

Stand H, York Street:

- 120: to QVB
- 320: to Green Square via Surry Hills

Stand J, York St:

- 251: PM peak service to Cope St, Lane Cove West via Freeway
- 253: PM peak service to Riverview
- 293: PM peak service to Busaco Rd, Marsfield via Lane Cove Tunnel & Epping Rd
- 297: PM peak service to Colvin Crescent, Denistone East via Lane Cove Tunnel & North Ryde
- 607X, 610, 610X, 613X, 614X, 615X, 616X, 617X & 618X: QVB

Stand K, York St:

- 594: QVB

Stand L, York St:

- L70, 270, 271, 273, 274: QVB

Stand Q, Clarence St:

- 607X: to Bella Vista station via Lane Cove Tunnel & M2
- 610X: to Castle Hill station via Lane Cove Tunnel & M2
- 613X: PM peak service to Bella Vista via Lane Cove Tunnel, & M2
- 614X: PM peak service to Crestwood via Lane Cove Tunnel, M2 & Winston Hills
- 615X: PM peak and night service to North Kellyville via Lane Cove Tunnel, M2 & Baulkham Hills
- 616X: PM peak and night service to Merriville Kellyville Ridge via Lane Cove Tunnel, Glenwood & Stanhope Gardens

Stand R, Clarence St:

- 120: to Chatswood via Willoughby
- 251: evening peak service to Lane Cove West via Gore Hill Freeway
- 252: to Gladesville via Pacific Highway
- 253: evening peak service Riverview via Freeway
- 261: to Lane Cove via Longueville
- 285: peak hour service to Lane Cove Industrial Estate via Freeway & Epping Road
- 288: to Epping station via Gore Hill Freeway, Lane Cove, North Ryde & Macquarie University
- 290: early morning and late night service to Epping via Pacific Highway
- 292: to Marsfield via Freeway, Lane Cove, Mowbray Rd, Fontenoy Rd and Macquarie University
- 293: evening peak service to Busaco Rd, Marsfield via Lane Cove Tunnel & Epping Rd
- 294: 3 morning peak services to Macquarie Centre via Freeway & Talavera Rd
- 297: to Denistone East via Gore Hill Freeway & Lane Cove Tunnel
- 320: to Gore Hill

Stand S, Clarence St:

- 194: to St Ives Chase
- 270: to Terrey Hills via Forest Way
- L70: PM peak limited-stops service to Terrey Hills via Forest Way
- 271: to Belrose
- 273: PM peak service to Killarney Heights
- 274: to Davidson, via Belrose
- 594: to North Turramurra via Eastern Arterial Road

Stand T, Clarence St:

- 100: to Taronga Zoo
- 168X: PM peak service to Warringah Mall via North Balgowlah
- 169: to Manly via Wakehurst Parkway, Beacon Hill, Dee Why & Pittwater Road
- 169X: PM peak service to Manly via Wakehurst Parkway, Beacon Hill, Dee Why & Pittwater Road
- 171X: PM peak service to Manly via Clontarf & South Balgowlah
- 175X: PM peak service to Brookvale

Stand U, Jamison St

- 165X: PM peak service to South Curl Curl

Stand V, Kent Street

- 620X: to Dural Bus Depot
- 642X: to Dural Round Corner
- 652X: to West Pennant Hills

== Trackplan ==
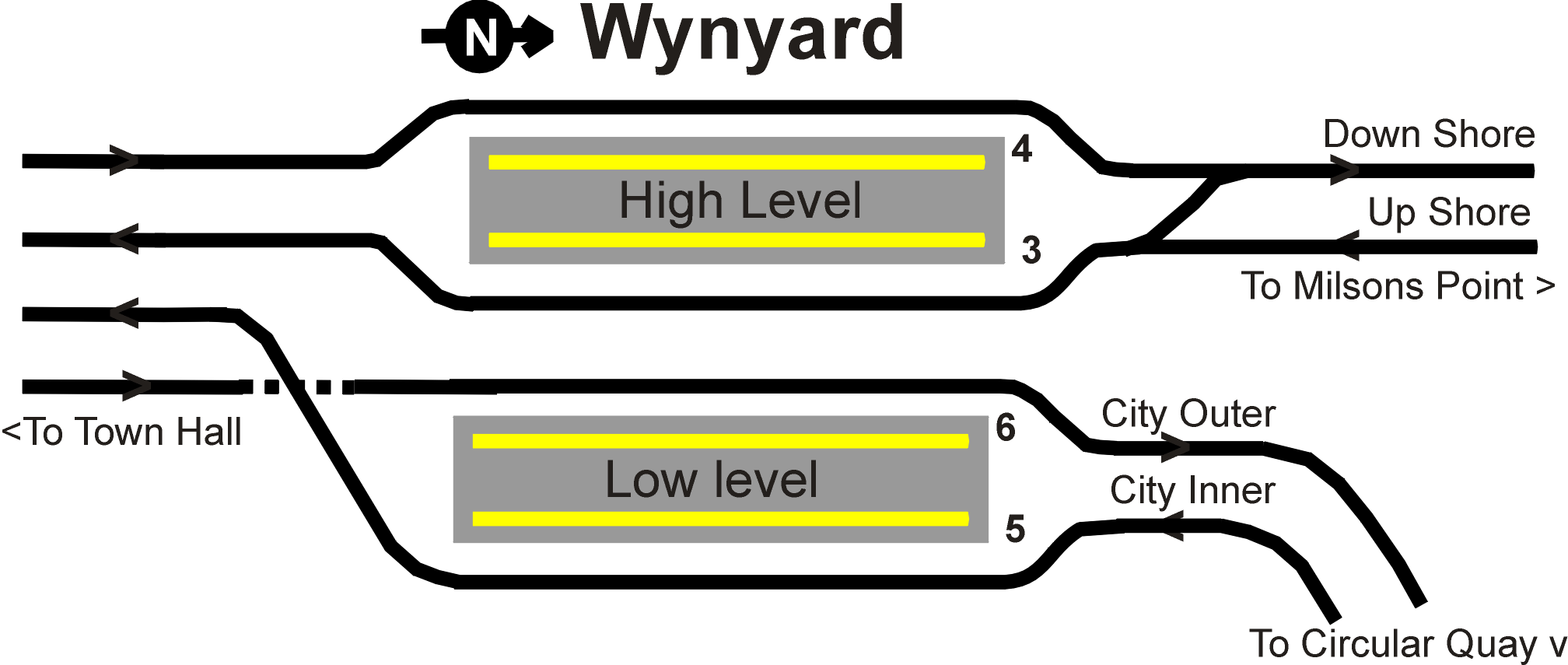
Track layout

== See also ==
- Architecture of Sydney
- List of Sydney railway stations
- Railways in Sydney
- Rail transport in New South Wales
- Sydney underground railways
