= ANZAC Rifle Range railway station =

Former railway station in Sydney, Australia

ANZAC Rifle Range

General information
- Location: Vicinity of Como Crescent, Wattle Grove; New South Wales, Australia
- Coordinates: 33.9463°S 150.9401°E
- Operator: Public Transport Commission
- Line: Holsworthy
- Distance: 38.563 kilometres (23.962 mi) from Central
- Platforms: 1 (1 side)
- Tracks: 1

Construction
- Structure type: Ground

History
- Opened: October 1920
- Closed: 8 April 1974

Services
Preceding station	Former services	Following station
Terminus	Holsworthy Line	Liverpool Terminus
Location

ANZAC Rifle Range railway station is a closed railway station on the Holsworthy railway line in New South Wales, Australia. The platform opened in 1920 and closed on 8 April 1974. The platform served the former ANZAC Rifle Range at Holsworthy Barracks.

== See also ==
- ANZAC Rifle Range, the relocated range at Malabar Headland.
