= Holsworthy railway line =

Railway line in Sydney, Australia

Holsworthy line

Overview
- Termini: Liverpool; ANZAC Rifle Range
- Continues from: Main South line

Service
- Operator: Public Transport Commission

History
- Opened: 21 January 1918
- Closed: 21 June 1977

Technical
- Line length: 4 miles 73 chains (7.9 km)
- Track gauge: 4 ft 8 1/2 in (1,435 mm)

The Holsworthy railway line was located in South-western Sydney. It was constructed during World War I, mainly using labour from the Holsworthy Internment Camp. Its purpose was to service the Holsworthy army facilities opening on 21 January 1918.

Constructed largely with second-hand materials, It branched off the Main South line north of Liverpool station crossing the Georges River via a bridge that had nine 30 metre approach spans which came from old crossings of the Wollondilly River by the Main South line near Carrick and of Solitary Creek by the Main Western line near Tarana.

The main span was a 98 foot (30 m) truss from the Main South line bridge over Argyle Street, Moss Vale. After crossing the river the line followed Greenhills Avenue through Clinches Pond Reserve, then curved to the east, following Anzac Parade on its south side to ANZAC Rifle Range.

After the line opened, several additional sidings were constructed. The Ordnance Stores Siding opened 29 April 1919 with standing room for 75 four-wheel wagons on three loop sidings. On 2 October 1923 the line was curtailed to Anzac Rifle Range. After falling into disuse, World War II resulted in the line being restored. After declining again, the line was formally closed in June 1977. The only tangible signs of the line today are the piers across the Georges River and a bridge across Harris Creek, adjacent to Heathcote Road, that today is used by foot and cycle traffic.

When the East Hills line was extended from East Hills to Glenfield in 1986, a siding was provided to the army facilities. The site will also be served by the Moorebank Intermodal Terminal which will be connected to the Southern Sydney Freight Line near Casula station.
