= Warwick Farm Racecourse railway station =

Former railway station in Sydney, New South Wales, Australia

Warwick Farm Racecourse

General information
- Location: Warwick Farm, Sydney, New South Wales; Australia
- Coordinates: 33°54′47″S 150°56′28″E
- Operator: State Rail Authority
- Line: Warwick Farm Racecourse
- Distance: 34.68 kilometres (21.55 mi) from Central
- Platforms: 1
- Tracks: 2

Construction
- Structure type: Ground

Other information
- Status: Demolished

History
- Opened: 12 June 1889
- Closed: 18 August 1990

Services
Preceding station	Former services	Following station
Terminus	Warwick Farm Racecourse Line	Cabramatta Terminus
Location

Warwick Farm Racecourse railway station was a railway station on the Warwick Farm Racecourse branch line in Warwick Farm, New South Wales, Australia. The station served the Warwick Farm Racecourse.

The station opened on 12 June 1889. The station was used during the First World War to transport troops from the wartime Warwick Farm Camp.

From 19 November 1977 to 16 February 1979, the station was not used. Although reopening in 1979, the branch line was officially closed in 1991, with the last passenger train running on 18 August 1990.
