= Liverpool railway station, Sydney =

Railway station in Sydney, New South Wales, Australia

Liverpool
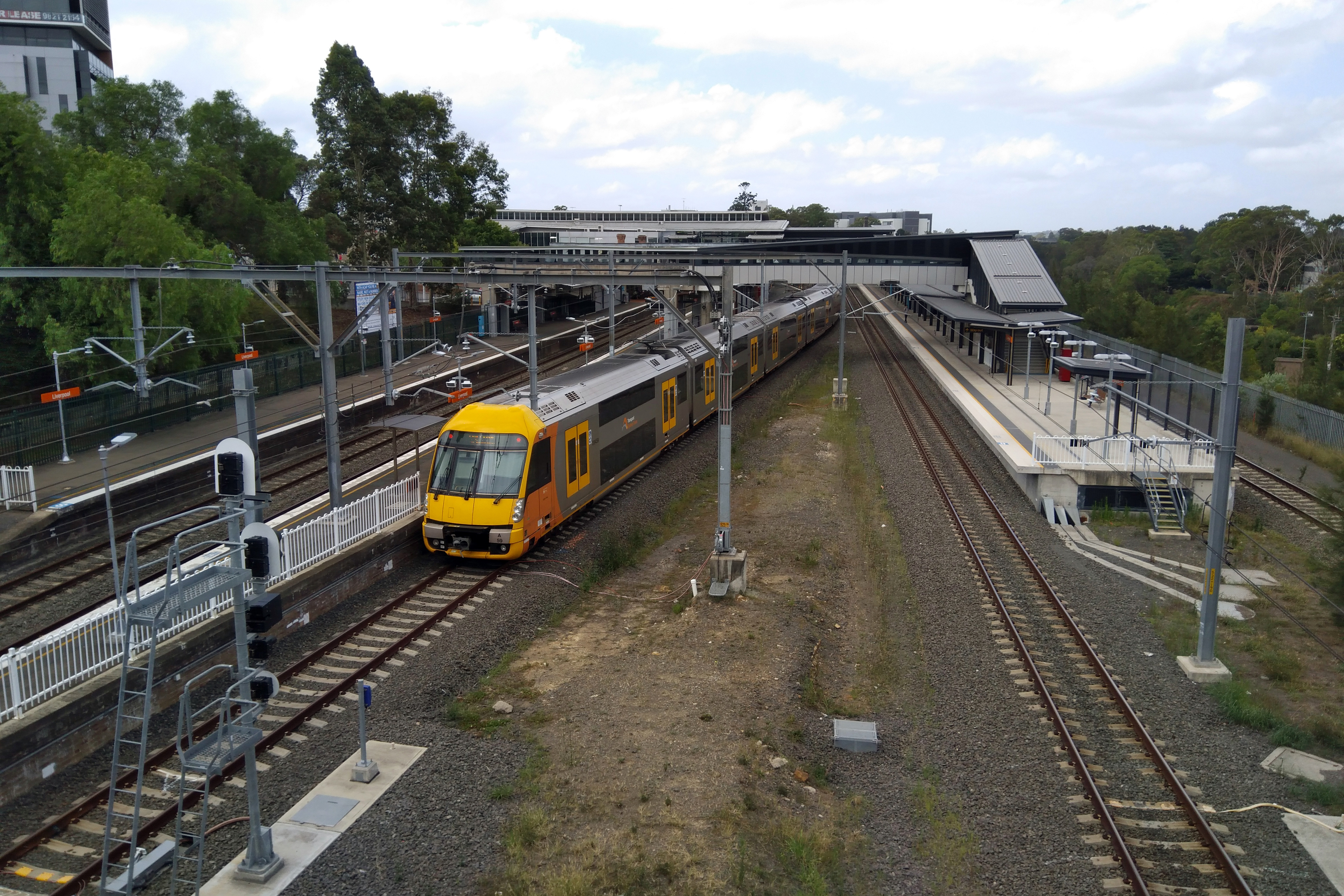
- Liverpool railway station in December 2017, after construction of Platform 4 and the Southern Sydney Freight Line

General information
- Location: Bigge Street, Liverpool; Sydney, New South Wales; Australia
- Coordinates: 33°55′30″S 150°55′38″E
- Elevation: 16 metres (52 ft)
- Owner: Transport Asset Manager of NSW
- Operator: Sydney Trains
- Line: Main Southern
- Distance: 38.68 km (24.03 mi) from Central
- Platforms: 4 (2 side, 1 island)
- Tracks: 5
- Connections: Bus

Construction
- Structure type: Ground
- Accessible: Yes

Other information
- Status: Staffed
- Station code: LPO
- Website: Transport for NSW

History
- Opened: 26 September 1856 (169 years ago)
- Electrified: Yes (from 1930)

Passengers
- 2025: 4,684,873 (year); 12,835 (daily) (Sydney Trains)
- Rank: 37

Services
Preceding station	Sydney Trains	Following station
Casula towards Leppington	Leppington & Inner West Line	Warwick Farm towards City Circle
Terminus	Liverpool & Inner West Line	Warwick Farm towards City Circle
Casula towards Leppington	Cumberland Line	Warwick Farm towards Richmond
Former services
Preceding station	Sydney Trains	Following station
Terminus	Bankstown Line (until 2024)	Warwick Farm towards City Circle
Preceding station	Former services	Following station
ANZAC Rifle Range Terminus	Holsworthy Line (1920–1974)	Terminus
Location

Liverpool railway station is a heritage-listed suburban railway station located on the Main Southern line, serving the Sydney suburb of Liverpool. It is served by Sydney Trains T2 Leppington & Inner West Line, T3 Liverpool & Inner West Line and T5 Cumberland Line services. It was added to the New South Wales State Heritage Register on 2 April 1999.

== History ==
The town (now suburb) of Liverpool on the Georges River was one of the earliest settlements of the colony of New South Wales. The station opened on 26 September 1856 and was an early terminus of the Main South line. Immediately north of Liverpool station, a former branch line crossed the Georges River and entered the Holsworthy military base. The pylons for the bridge over the river have been reused to provide a pedestrian walkway.

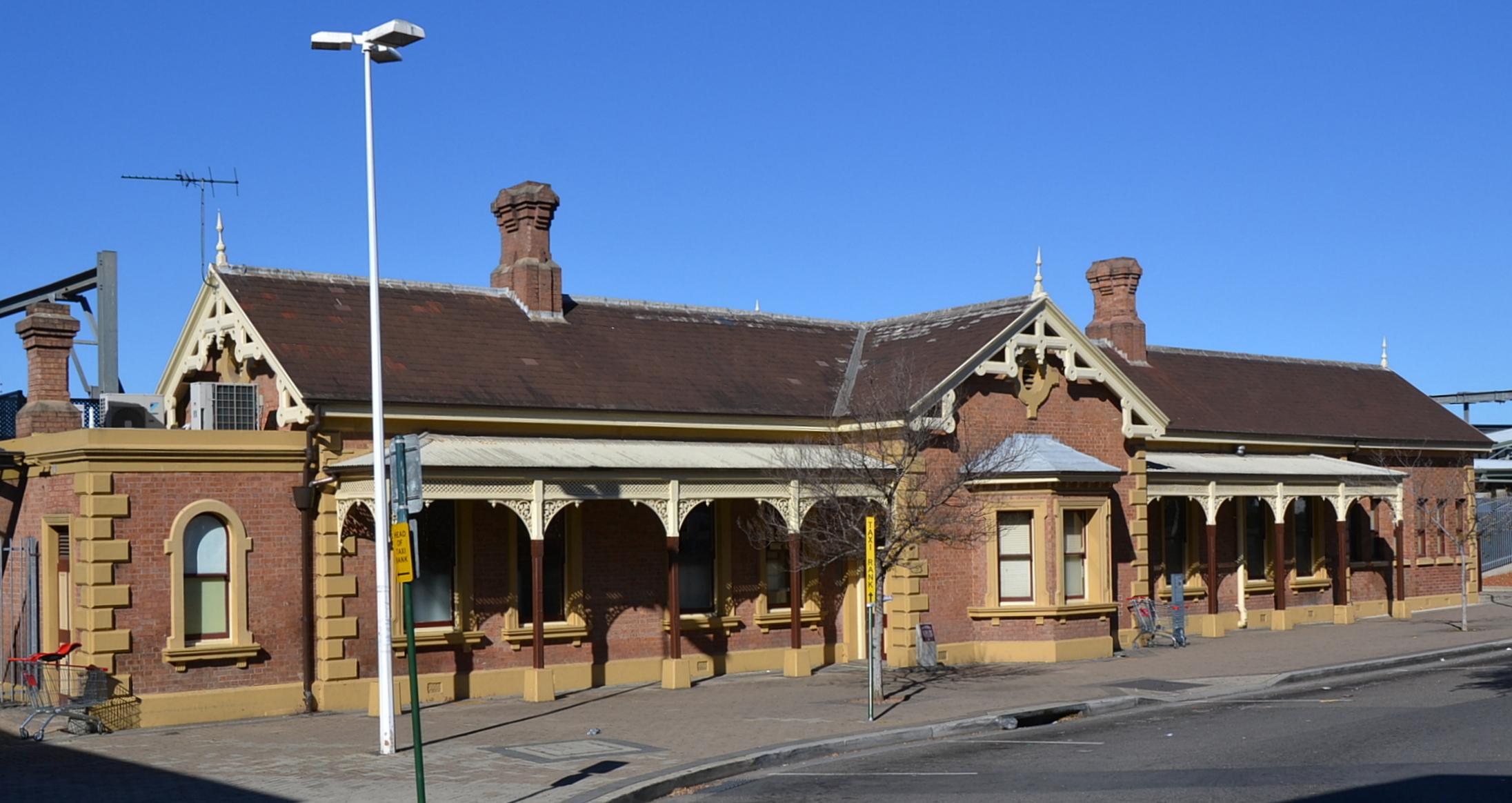
The original station building on platform 1

In 1930, the line from Central was electrified. Liverpool remained the terminating point for electric services until the wires were extended to Campbelltown in 1968. It was also a calling point for regional services until the 1990s.

In 1965 one person was killed and three injured when a freight train collided with a stationary electric passenger train at Liverpool station.

In 2000, the station underwent a major easy access upgrade with the provision of passenger lifts to the platforms, a new passenger concourse, toilets and a refurbishment of the heritage building on platform 1.

The Southern Sydney Freight Line passes to the east of the station. It opened in January 2013. Around the same time, a new platform for southbound services was constructed as part of the Rail Clearways Program. Platform 4 opened in January 2014. Previously platform 2 was the main southbound platform with platform 3 used for turnbacks.

== Services ==
=== Platforms ===
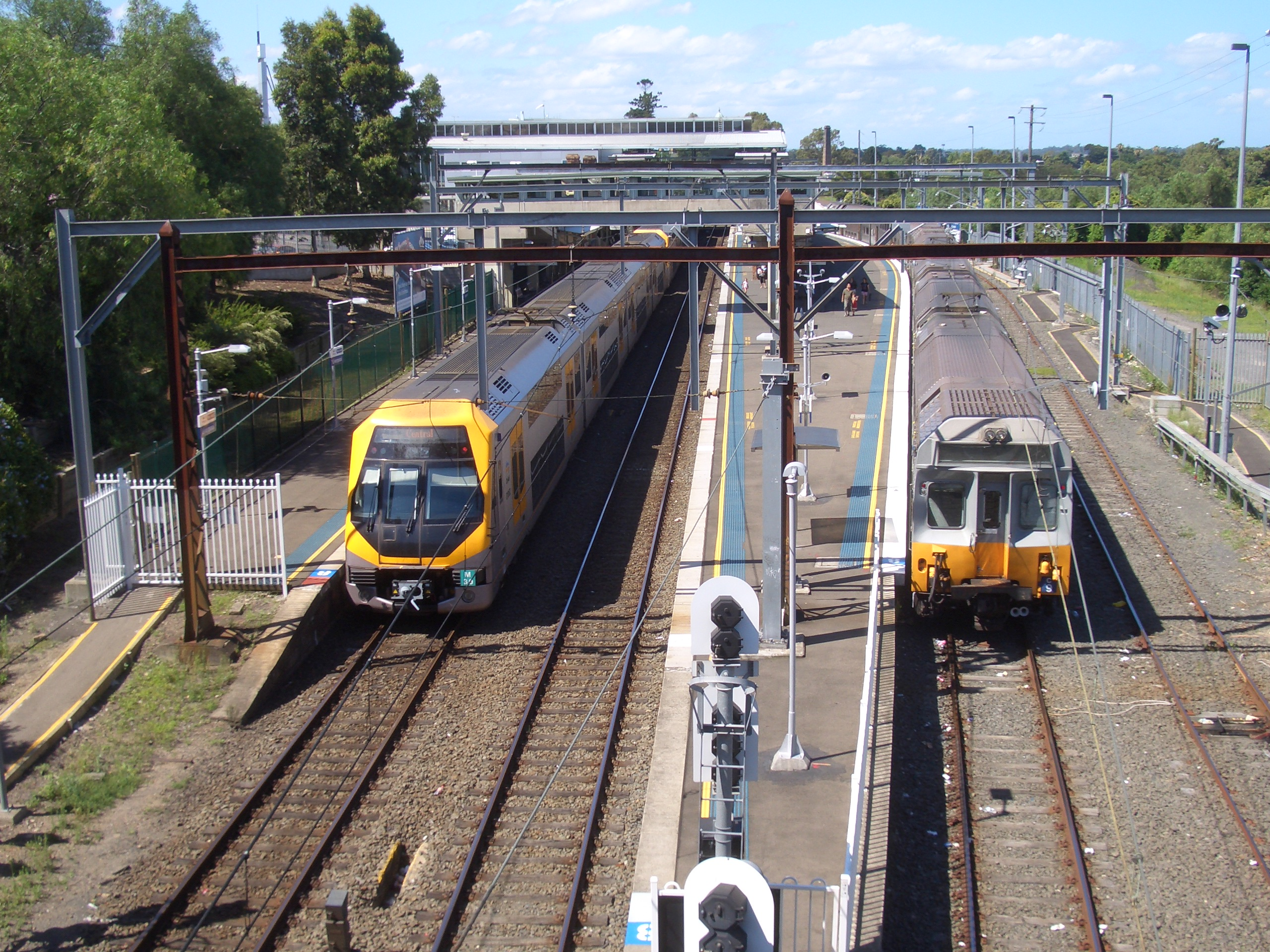
Northbound view from Newbridge Road in December 2007 before construction of Platform 4 and the Southern Sydney Freight Line

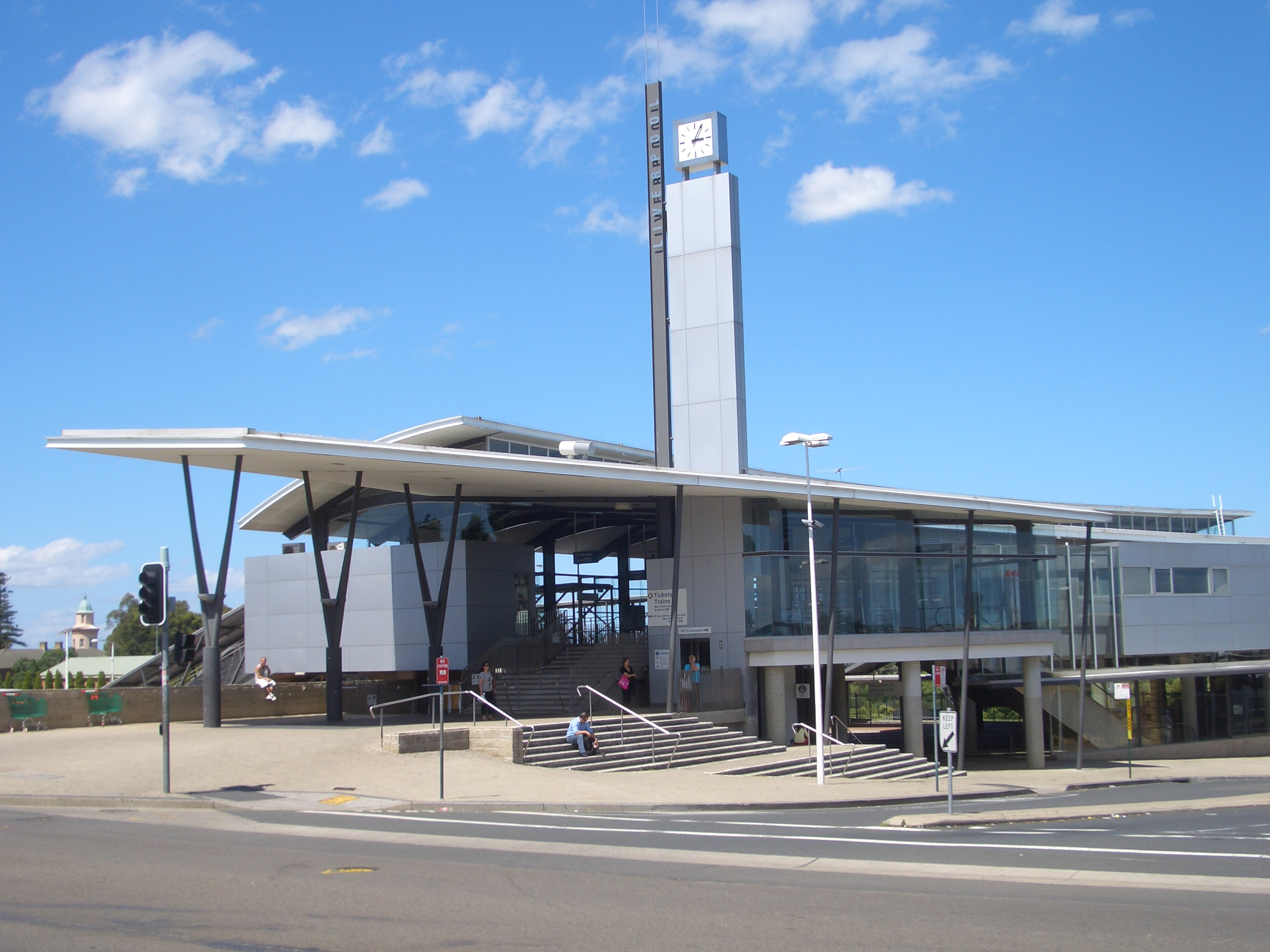
Station building and concourse in December 2007

The station has four platforms. Platforms 1 and 4 serve the Inner West & Leppington and Cumberland lines, and platforms 2 and 3 serve as a terminus for Inner West line trains via Regents Park.

Platform	Line	Stopping pattern	Notes
1	T2	services to Central & the City Circle via Granville	
1	T5	services to Blacktown, Schofields & Richmond	
2	T2	2 weekday late night services to the City Circle	
2	T3	terminating services, returning to the City Circle via Regents Park	
3	T3	terminating services, returning to the City Circle via Regents Park	
3	T5	weekend services to Schofields	
4	T2	services to Leppington	
4	T5	services to Leppington	

=== Transport links ===
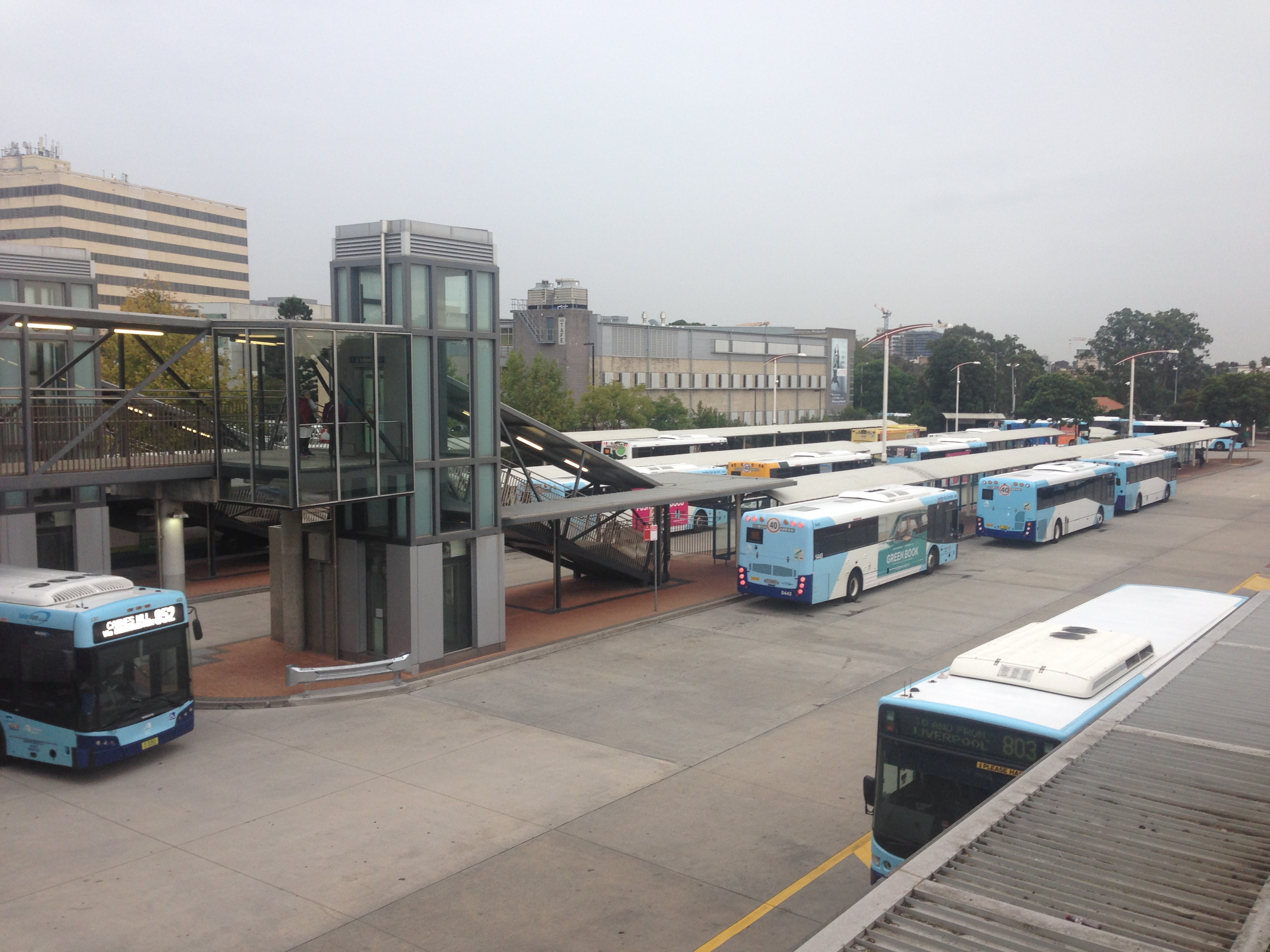
Bus Interchange as seen from the concourse

Transit Systems operates 30 bus routes to and from Liverpool station:

- 801: to Badgerys Creek
- 802: to Parramatta station
- 803: to Miller
- 804: to Parramatta station
- 805: to Cabramatta station
- 806: to Parramatta station
- 808: to Fairfield station
- 819: to Prairiewood
- 823: to Warwick Farm
- 827: to Carnes Hill
- 851: to Carnes Hill
- 852: to Carnes Hill
- 853: to Carnes Hill
- 854: to Carnes Hill
- 855: to Austral
- 856: to Bringelly
- 857: to Narellan
- 865: to Casula
- 866: to Casula
- 869: to Ingleburn
- 870: to Campbelltown Hospital
- 871: to Campbelltown Hospital
- 872: to Campbelltown Hospital
- 901: to Holsworthy
- 902: to Holsworthy
- 903: to Chipping Norton
- 904: to Fairfield station
- M90 to Westfield Burwood
- T80: to Parramatta station

Liverpool station is served by three NightRide routes:

- N30: between Macarthur station and Town Hall station
- N31: to Leppington station
- N50: to Town Hall station

== Heritage listing ==
Liverpool railway station was listed on the New South Wales State Heritage Register on 2 April 1999. Although the station has been substantially altered, several heritage aspects remain, including the platform 1 station building, dating from c. 1880, the c. 1879 goods shed and 1880 brick-faced platforms.

Liverpool station building is a good example of a third class station building in the centre of a large scale redevelopment of the site. It indicates the change in technology and approach to railway construction. Liverpool goods shed is a rare brick structure on the State system which is substantially intact with platforms and jib crane. It is located in an historic town and is the last remnant of the early station and yard complex at the site. It is rare as one of the last two surviving brick goods sheds in the State.
