= Town Hall railway station, Sydney =

Heritage-listed railway station in Sydney, New South Wales, Australia

Town Hall
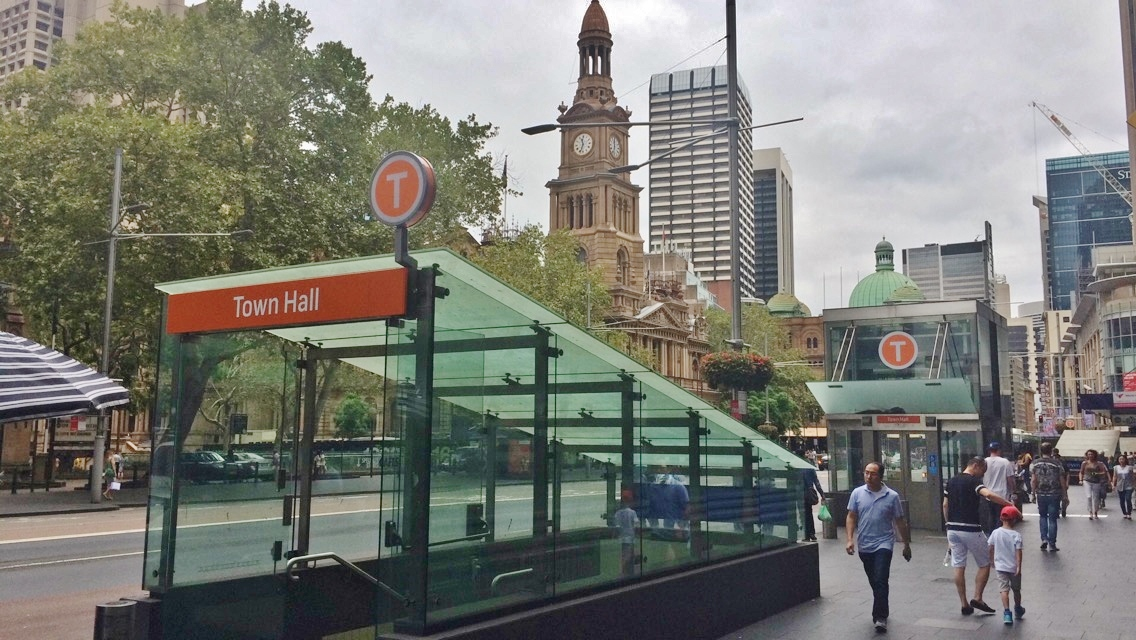
- George Street entrance, February 2015

General information
- Location: George Street, Sydney
- Coordinates: 33°52′25″S 151°12′17″E
- Owner: New South Wales Government via Transport Asset Manager of New South Wales
- Operator: Sydney Trains
- Line: City Circle
- Distance: 1.18 km (0.73 mi) from Central (clockwise)
- Platforms: 6 (2 island, 2 side)
- Tracks: 6
- Connections: Gadigal; Bus; Town Hall

Construction
- Structure type: Underground
- Depth: 6 metres (20 ft) (upper level); 12 metres (39 ft) (lower level)
- Platform levels: 2
- Accessible: Yes
- Architect: John Bradfield (designer)

Other information
- Status: Staffed

History
- Opened: 28 February 1932; 94 years ago

Passengers
- 2025: 41,130,225 (year); 112,686 (daily) (Sydney Trains)
- Rank: 2

Services
Preceding station	Sydney Trains	Following station
Central towards Emu Plains or Richmond	North Shore & Western Line	Wynyard towards Berowra
Central towards Parramatta or Leppington	Leppington & Inner West Line	Wynyard as the Airport & South Line towards Macarthur
Central towards Liverpool	Liverpool & Inner West Line clockwise only	Wynyard towards City Circle
Central towards Waterfall or Cronulla	Eastern Suburbs & Illawarra Line	Martin Place towards Bondi Junction
Central as the Inner West & Leppington Line towards Parramatta or Leppington	Airport & South Line	Wynyard towards Macarthur
Central towards Hornsby	Northern Line	Wynyard towards Gordon
Preceding station	Intercity Trains	Following station
Wynyard towards Gosford or Wyong	Central Coast & Newcastle Line (peak hour services)	Central Terminus
Central towards Kiama	South Coast Line (peak hour and weekend services)	Martin Place towards Bondi Junction
City Circle route map
Location

Town Hall railway station is a heritage-listed underground suburban rail station located in the centre of the Sydney central business district in New South Wales, Australia. The station opened on 28 February 1932. It is named after the Sydney Town Hall, located directly above the station.

== History ==
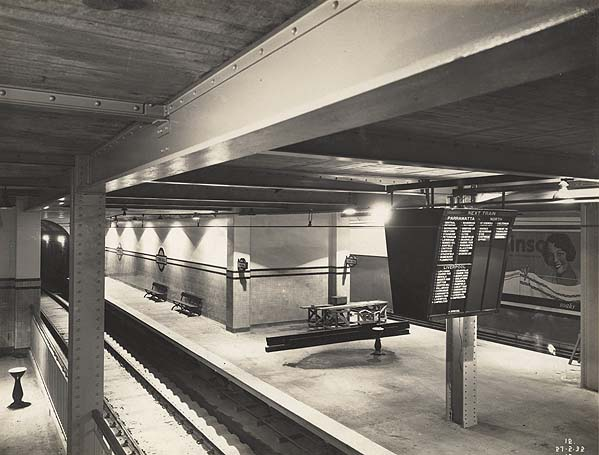
Platform 2 in 1932

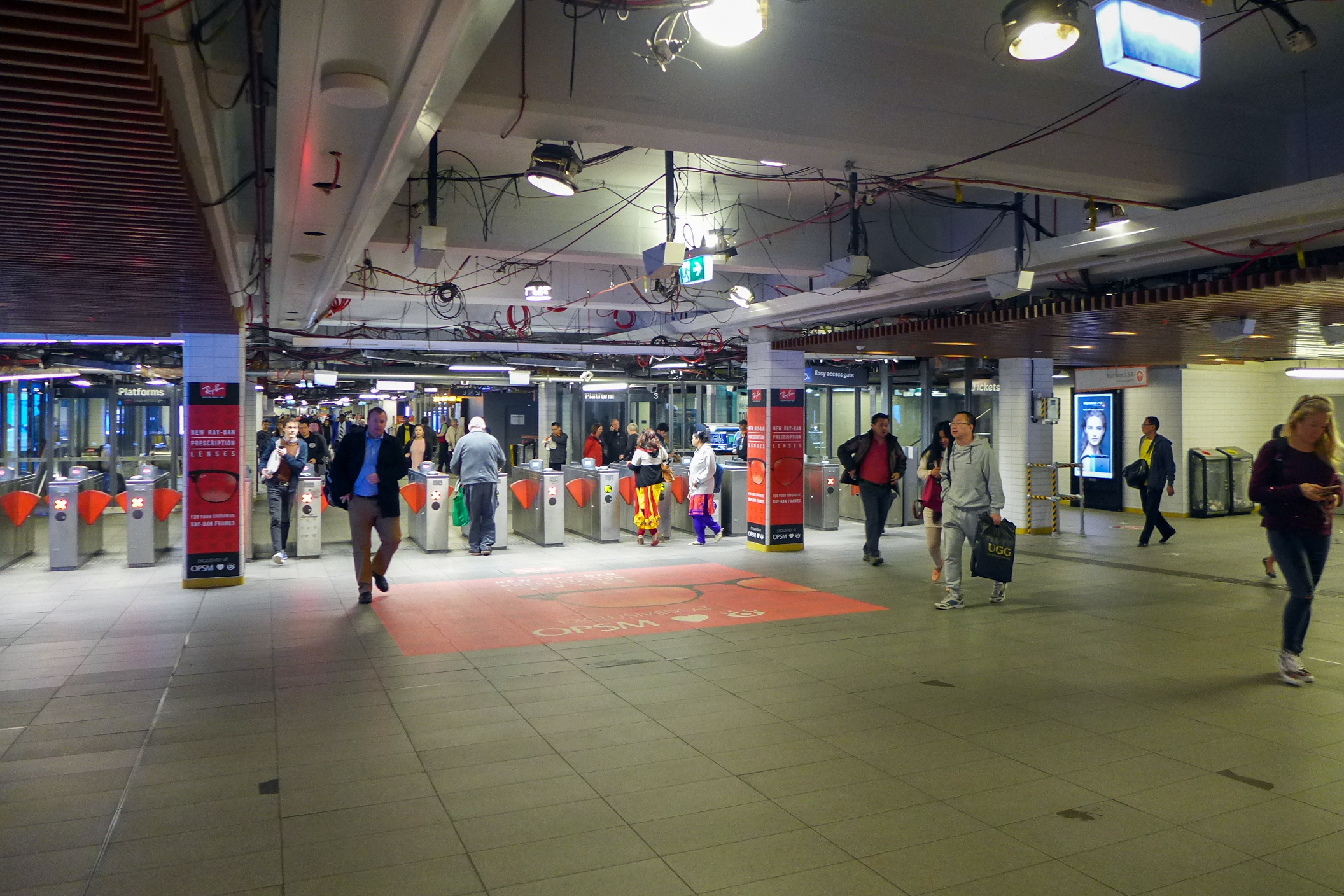
Concourse during renovation in 2017

The station is built on the site of Sydney's earliest colonial cemetery, the Old Sydney Burial Ground. In 2008, part of this cemetery was being excavated from under the Town Hall.

The station opened on 28 February 1932 and was built with six platforms, which were split over two levels with three platforms on each level. When the station opened, only four of the platforms were in use: platforms 1, 2 and 3 on the upper level and platform 6, served by escalators, on the lower level. The other two platforms were built in preparation for a proposed western suburbs line from the city to Gladesville, as envisaged under the Bradfield scheme. This line was never built, and the platforms (4 and 5) remained disused until incorporated into the Eastern Suburbs line when it opened in June 1979.

The station concourse had a major restructure in 2005 when the shops inside were closed to make way for the increasing crowds.

During a refurbishment of the station in 2014, a sign pointing to an air-raid shelter was uncovered on a staircase leading to Platforms 1 and 2. It has been encased in a Perspex casing.

== Station configuration ==
Town Hall has two platform levels, each with three platforms – physically two island platforms, but set up so that one faces two tracks and the other faces the other track. Each platform has one lift in the centre connecting the concourse with the platforms, providing Easy Access for wheelchairs. These facilities were constructed in 1999. The lower-level platforms (4 to 6) have 4 escalators to the concourse. As the platform is not wide enough, the escalators are in a cross configuration, with two at either end of the platform and another two at the centre. The escalator directions can be changed by staff throughout the day as the passenger flow dictates. The upper-level platforms have stairs up to the concourse. There are also small staircases linking the two platform levels.

The concourse is above the two platform levels and immediately below street level. The station is linked to nearby shopping centres including the Queen Victoria Building, The Galeries, Town Hall Square, Pavilion Plaza and, Woolworths. There are also several exits up to each side of George Street.

Opened in 2024, the Sydney Metro line includes another station located at Gadigal.

== Platforms and services ==
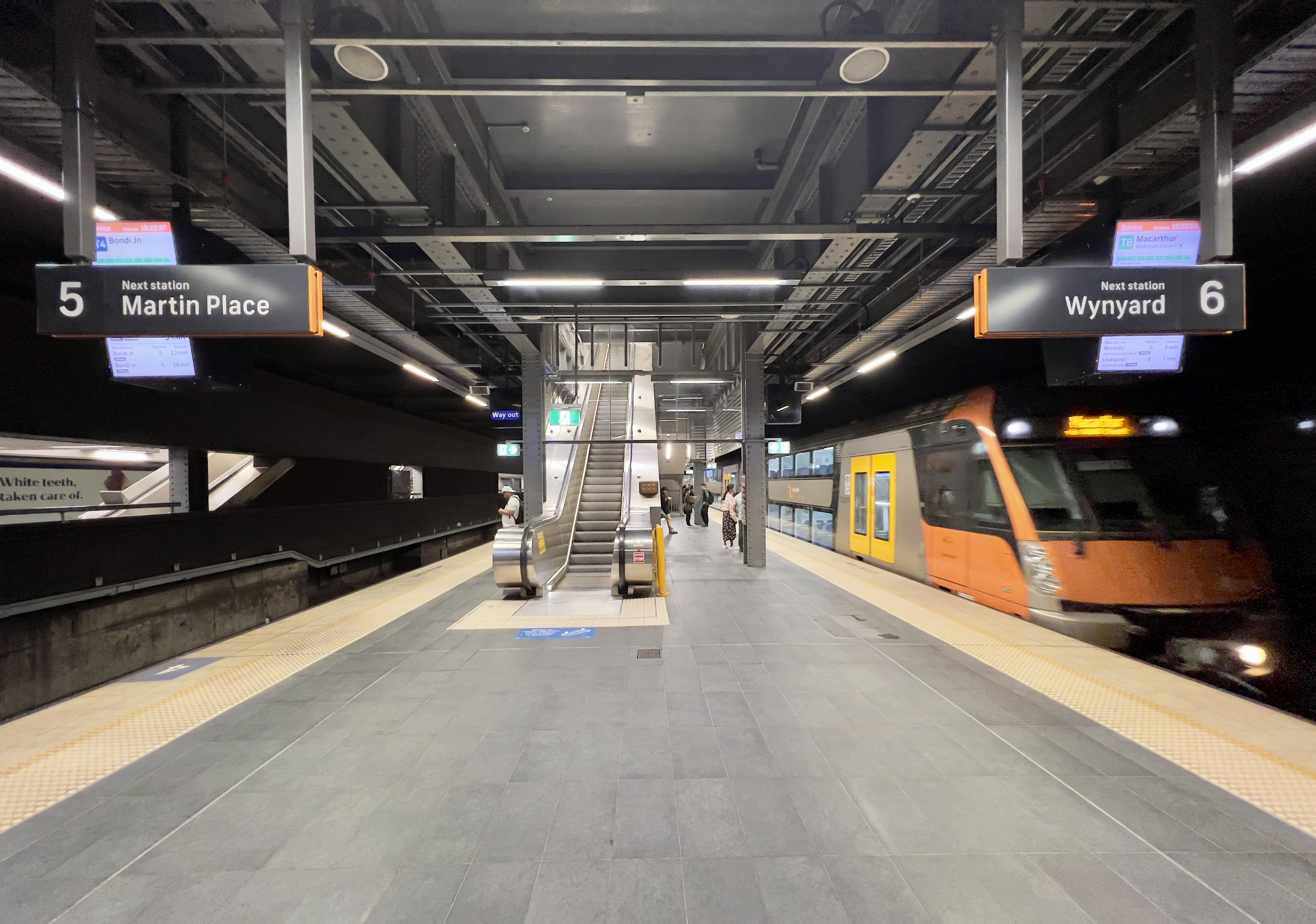
Platforms 5 and 6

Platform	Line	Stopping pattern	Notes
1	Leppington & Inner West Line	Services to Homebush, Parramatta & Leppington	
1	Liverpool & Inner West Line	Services to Liverpool via Lidcombe and Regents Park	
2	North Shore & Western Line	Services to Penrith, Emu Plains & Richmond via Central & Strathfield	
2	Northern Line (Sydney)	Services to Epping & Hornsby via Central & Strathfield	
2	Central Coast & Newcastle Line	6 Weekday Morning peak hour services to Sydney Central	
3	North Shore & Western Line	Services to Lindfield, Gordon, Hornsby & Berowra	
3	Northern Line (Sydney)	Services to Gordon	
3	Central Coast & Newcastle Line	6 Weekday Evening peak hour services to Gosford & Wyong via Gordon	
4	Eastern Suburbs & Illawarra Line	Services to Cronulla, Waterfall & Helensburgh	
4	South Coast Line	Limited services to Wollongong, Dapto or Kiama via Wolli Creek	
5	Eastern Suburbs & Illawarra Line	Services to Bondi Junction	
5	South Coast Line	Limited services to Bondi Junction or Martin Place	
6	Airport & South Line	Services to Sydenham; 2 weekday evening services to Campbelltown	
6	Airport & South Line	Services to Revesby & Macarthur via Airport stations	

== Transport links ==
=== Light rail services ===
Above the underground concourse on George Street is the Town Hall light rail stop, which is the serviced by the L2 Randwick and L3 Kingsford lines.

Line	Destinations	Notes
L2	Circular Quay & Randwick	
L3	Circular Quay & Kingsford	

=== Bus services ===
Town Hall station is served by bus routes operated by Busways, CDC NSW, Keolis Downer Northern Beaches, Transdev John Holland and Transit Systems, under contract to Transport for NSW.

Stand A, QVB:
- 311: to Central Belmore Park
- 324: to Watsons Bay via Old South Head Road
- 325: to Watsons Bay via Vaucluse

Stand B, QVB:

- 437: to Five Dock
- 441: to Birchgrove
- 442: to Balmain East wharf

Stand C, QVB:

- 607X: to Bella Vista via Lane Cove Tunnel & M2 Motorway
- 610X: to Castle Hill via Lane Cove Tunnel & M2 Motorway

Stand D, QVB:

- 100: to Taronga Zoo
- 120: to Chatswood via Willoughby
- 441: to Art Gallery of New South Wales

Stand G, Park Street

- 311: to Eddy Avenue via Potts Point, Kings Cross and Darlinghurst
- 324: to Watsons Bay via Old South Head Road
- 325: to Watsons Bay via Vaucluse

Stand H, Park Street

- 389: to Bondi Junction station
- 441: to Art Gallery of New South Wales
- 500X: to Hyde Park
- 504: to The Domain
- 506: to The Domain

Stand J, Park Street

- 311: to Millers Point
- 324: to Walsh Bay
- 325: to Walsh Bay
- 389: to Australian National Maritime Museum

Stand K, Park Street

- 500X to: to West Ryde station
- 502: to Cabarita wharf
- 504: to Chiswick
- 505: to Woolwich wharf
- 506: to Macquarie University via East Ryde
- 507: to Meadowbank station

Stand L, Druitt Street

- 500X: to West Ryde station
- 502: to Cabarita wharf
- 504: to Chiswick
- 505: to Woolwich wharf
- 506: to Macquarie University via East Ryde
- 507: to Meadowbank station

== Trackplan ==
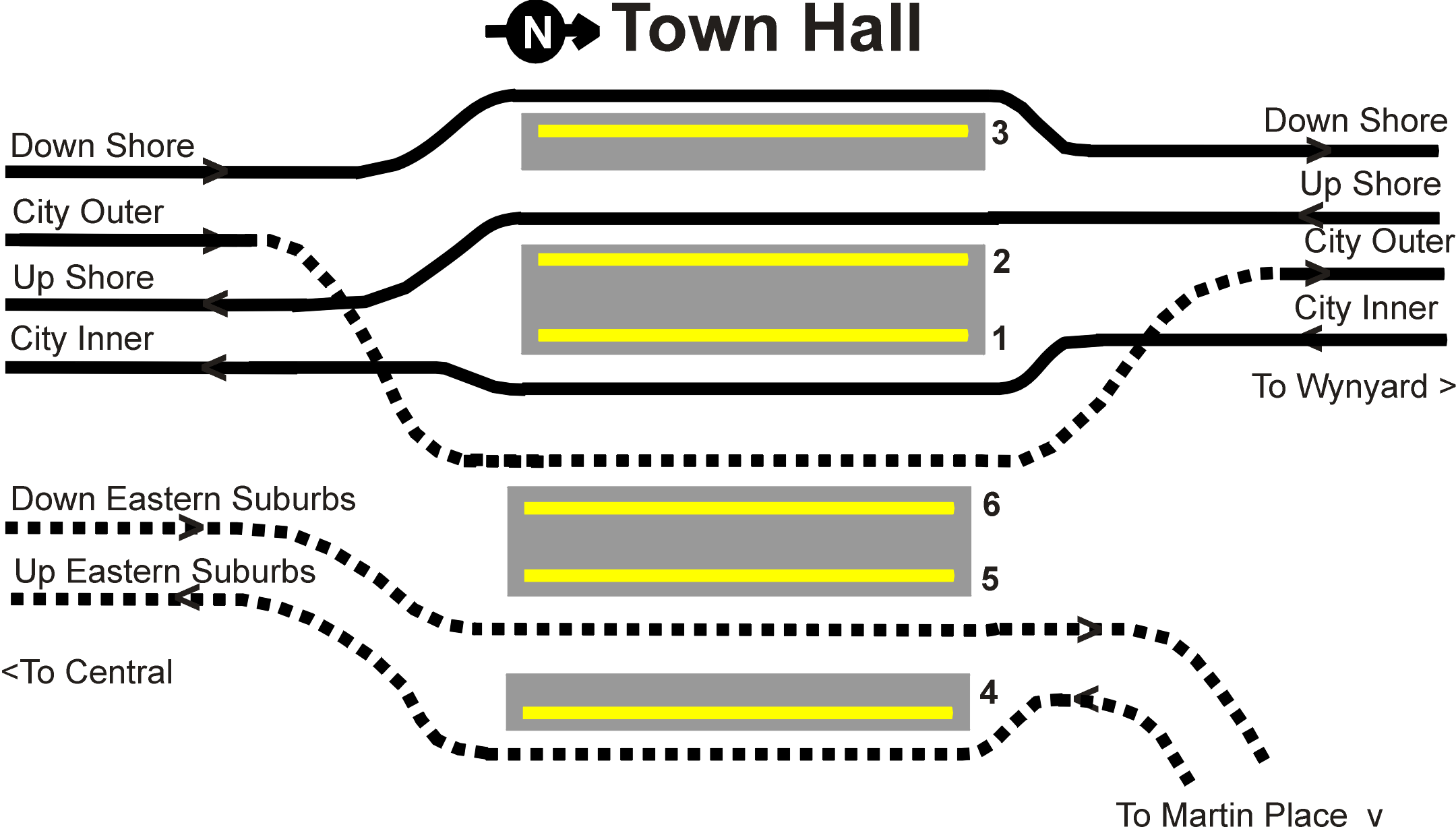
Track layout

== See also ==
- Architecture of Sydney
- List of Sydney railway stations
- Railways in Sydney
- Rail transport in New South Wales
- Sydney underground railways
