= City Circle =

Railway line in Sydney, New South Wales

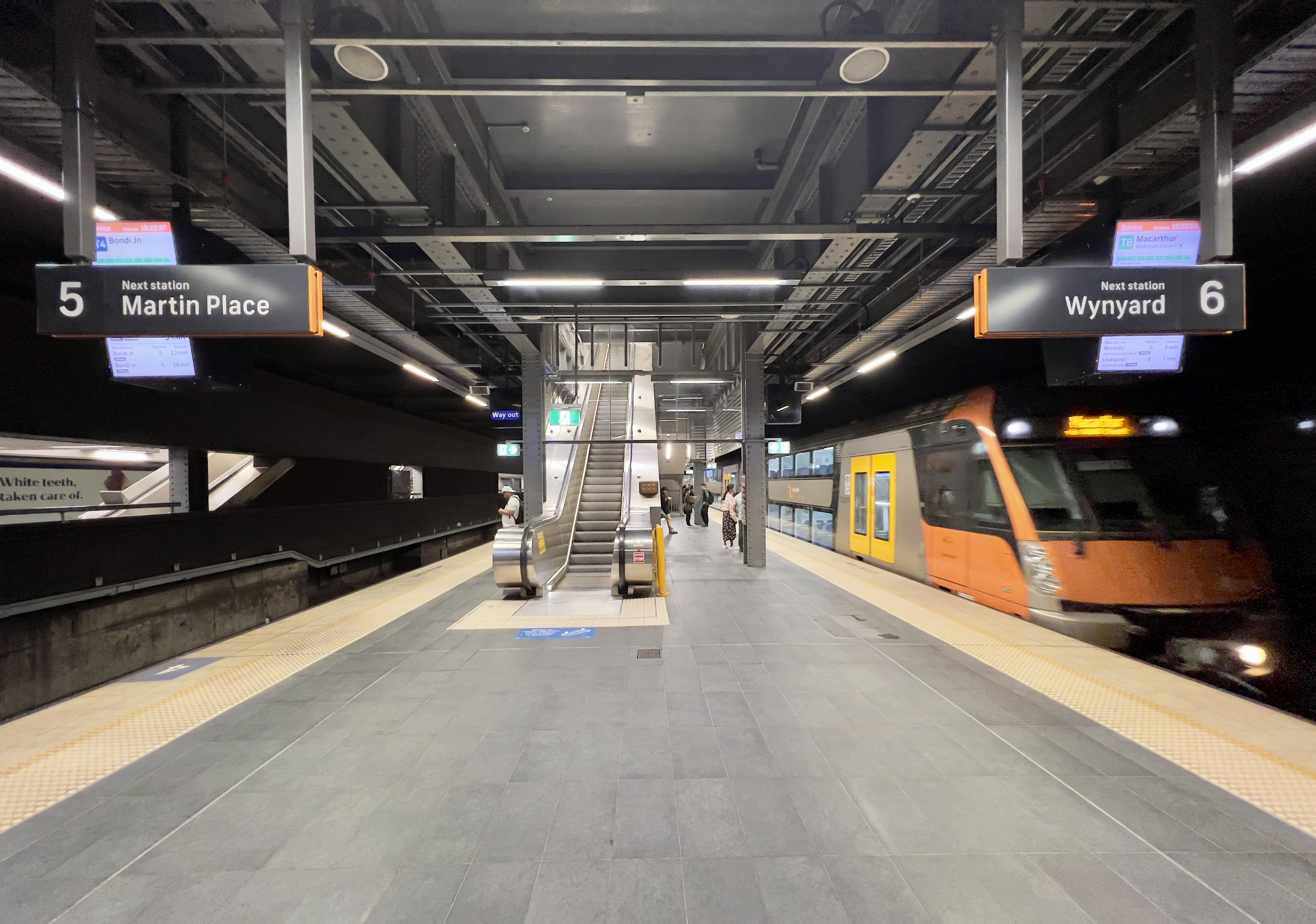
- Town Hall station, a major interchange and one of the busiest stations on the City Circle

Overview
- Owner: Transport Asset Manager of New South Wales
- Termini: Central
- Stations: 6

Service
- Services: T2 Leppington & Inner West Line; T3 Liverpool & Inner West Line; T8 Airport & South Line
- Operator: Sydney Trains

History
- Opened: 20 December 1926 (first segment); 22 January 1956 (entire loop)

Technical
- Line length: 6 km (3.7 mi)
- Track gauge: 1,435 mm (4 ft 8 1/2 in) standard gauge

The City Circle is a mostly-underground railway line located in the Sydney central business district and Haymarket, in New South Wales, Australia, that forms the core of Sydney's passenger rail network. The lines are owned by the Transport Asset Manager of New South Wales, a State government agency, and operated under Transport for NSW's Sydney Trains brand. Despite its name, the City Circle is of a horseshoe shape, with trains operating in a U-shaped pattern. The constituent stations of the Circle are (clockwise): Central, Town Hall, Wynyard, Circular Quay, St James, Museum and back to Central.

== History and description ==
The original concept for the City Railway was part of a report dated 1915 submitted to the government by chief railway engineer, John Bradfield, upon his return from overseas study, with work commencing the following year. His concepts were largely based on the New York City Subway, which he observed during his time in New York City.

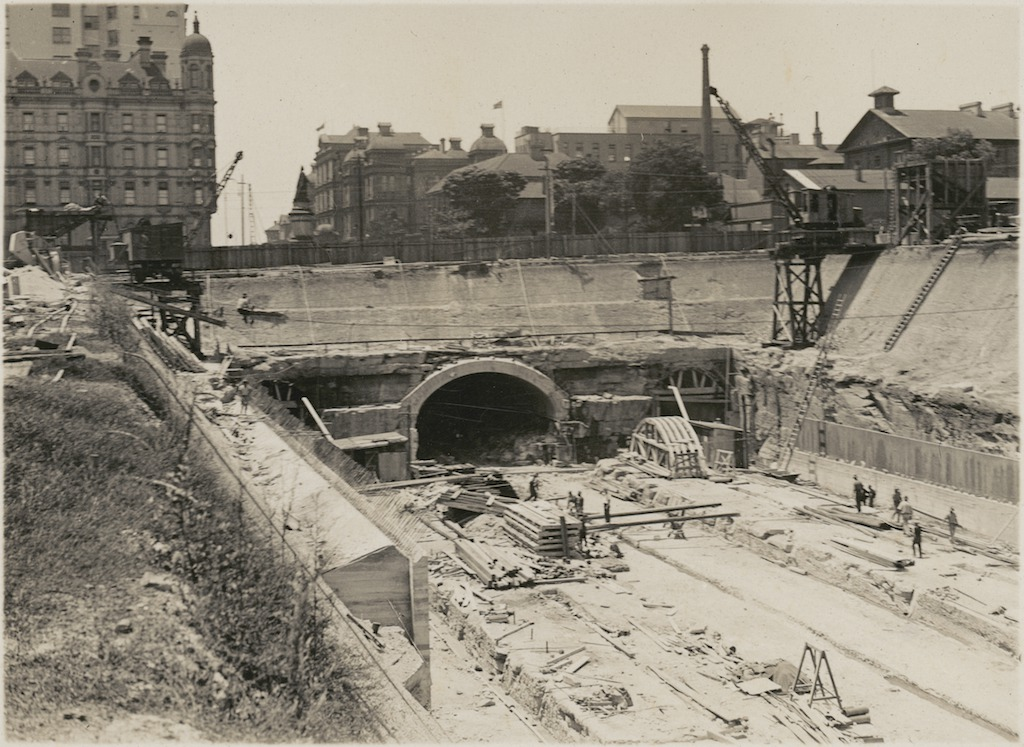
Construction of Museum station in 1925, using a cut and cover method

Built in stages, the first City Circle stations to open were the heritage-listed Museum and St James, which both opened in 1926 as part of the initial electrification of Sydney railways. Next was the "western limb" through Town Hall and Wynyard, which opened in 1932 in conjunction with the opening of the Sydney Harbour Bridge. This section contains four tunnels. Two connected to the Harbour Bridge, while the two City Circle tunnels terminated at Wynyard. In 1956, the dead ends at St James and Wynyard were joined and the "missing link", Circular Quay – was opened. Central and Circular Quay stations are above-ground (Circular Quay is elevated, directly underneath the Cahill Expressway), while the remainder are underground. Several unused railway tunnels also exist. The former tram tunnels at Wynyard, and other stub tunnels at St James are well known.

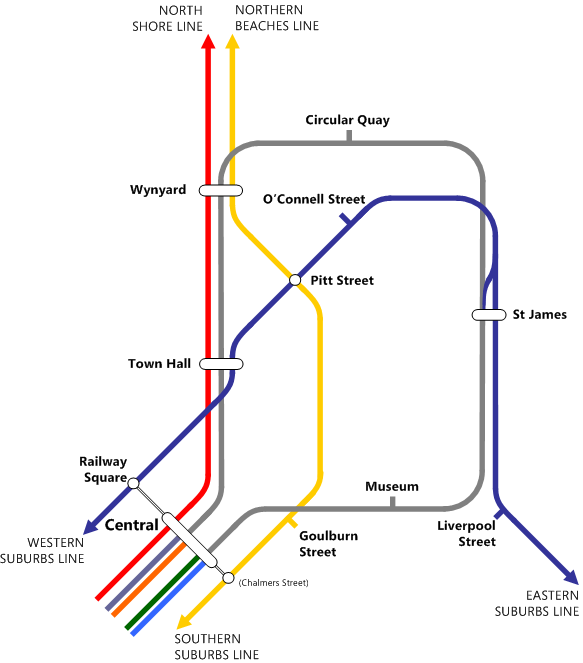
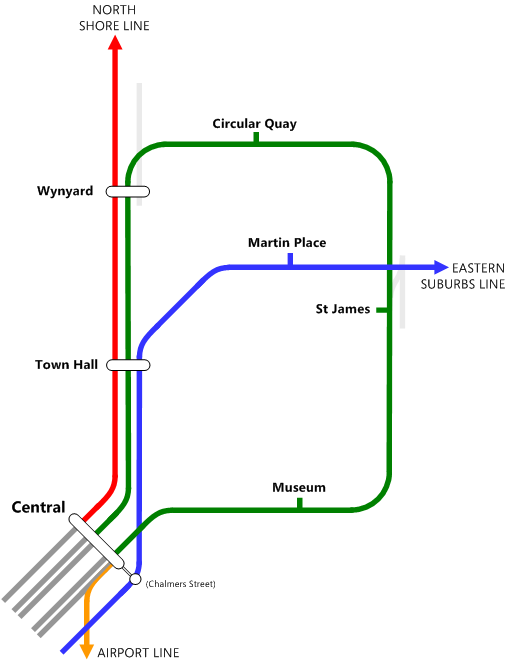
The original railway network for the Sydney CBD planned by John Bradfield, (left) and the network as it is today. The City Circle was built as planned and the Eastern Suburbs railway was built to a different alignment, though the Northern Beaches and Southern Suburbs line was never built.

The City Circle is double track throughout, although it forms four tracks at Central as there are two ends of the same track. The outer track is known as the "City Outer" and is used by trains travelling clockwise around the City Circle. In the direction of travel it passes through Central platform 17, Town Hall platform 6, Wynyard platform 6, Circular Quay platform 2, St James platform 2, Museum platform 2. Trains can then either proceed to Central platform 22 or 23, depending on which line they are running on. Similarly, the inner track is known as the "City Inner" and is used by trains travelling anti-clockwise. It starts from Central platform 20 or 21, again depending on which line a train is coming from. It then passes through Museum platform 1, St James platform 1, Circular Quay platform 1, Wynyard platform 5, Town Hall platform 1 then Central platform 19.

== Services and operations ==
The current service patterns generally consist of trains from the Inner West & Leppington Line running into the City Circle Outer, becoming Airport & South Line trains as they enter the circle. Conversely, trains from the Airport & South Line generally run into the City Circle Inner, becoming Inner West & Leppington Line trains. Liverpool & Inner West Line trains also operate via the City Circle Inner. A set of flying junctions at Central enable these patterns to be varied.

Prior to the integration of the Eastern Suburbs line into the Illawarra Line in 1980, Illawarra line trains also operated around the City Circle.

Trains on the Western and Northern lines usually do not use the City Circle but instead, proceed across the Harbour Bridge to the North Shore line and vice versa.

=== Speed control and reduced overlap ===
For more information about signalling, see Australian railway signalling
Until the City Circle Resignalling of the 1990s, the western stations of the line were signalling such that a following train could enter the platform while the previous train was still departing. The signal granting access to the platform would show a restrictive aspect (probably calling-on, red over red over small amber, which indicates that the train can proceed but the block is not necessarily clear) and train stops spread along the platform would control the speed of the following train. That allowed these stations to deal with 42 trains per hour in either direction provided sub 40 second dwell times.

The 1990s resignalling changed the older eastern stations to follow a similar operation. At some point the system was changed again to provide additional safety. Signals on the City Circle can no longer display a calling-on aspect but can display low-speed (red over red over small green, which means that the block is clear but to proceed slowly, not exceeding 25 kilometres per hour (16 mph)). Consequently, trains can no longer enter the platform while a previous train is departing, and the system cannot handle more than 20 trains per hour.

Original 1932 operation of speed controlled trips on the City Circle.

=== Stations ===
The line has six stations.

Name	Code	Distance from Central (km)		Opened	Notes
Name	Code	km	mi	Opened	Notes
Central	CEN	0	0	28 February 1855	
Town Hall	THL	1.21	0.75	28 February 1932	
Wynyard	WYD	2.05	1.27	28 February 1932	
Circular Quay	CQY	2.97	1.85	22 January 1956	
St James	SAJ	4.4	2.7	20 December 1926	
Museum	MSM	4.99	3.10	20 December 1926	
After Museum, the line loops back to Central

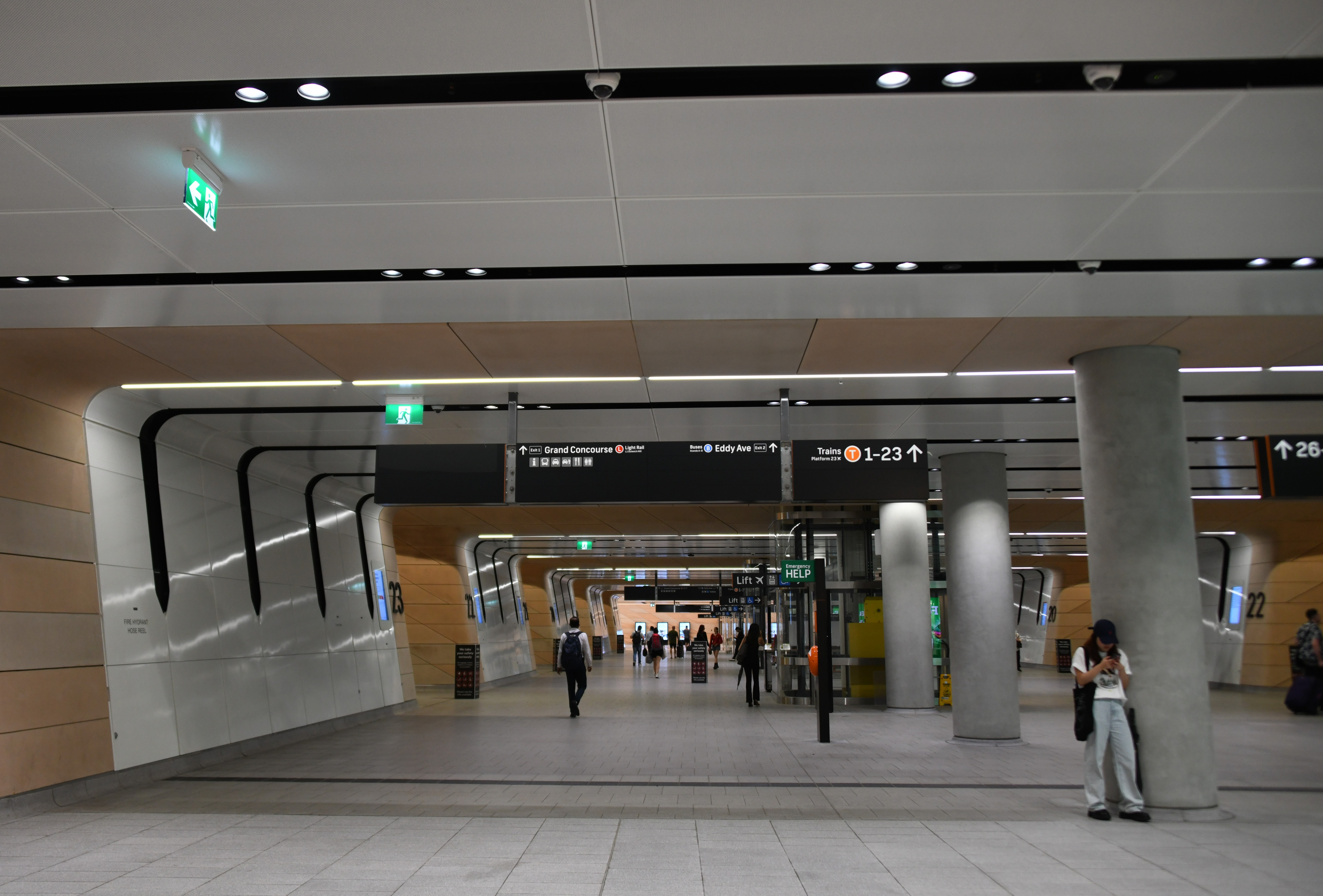
Central, concourse of City Circle platforms

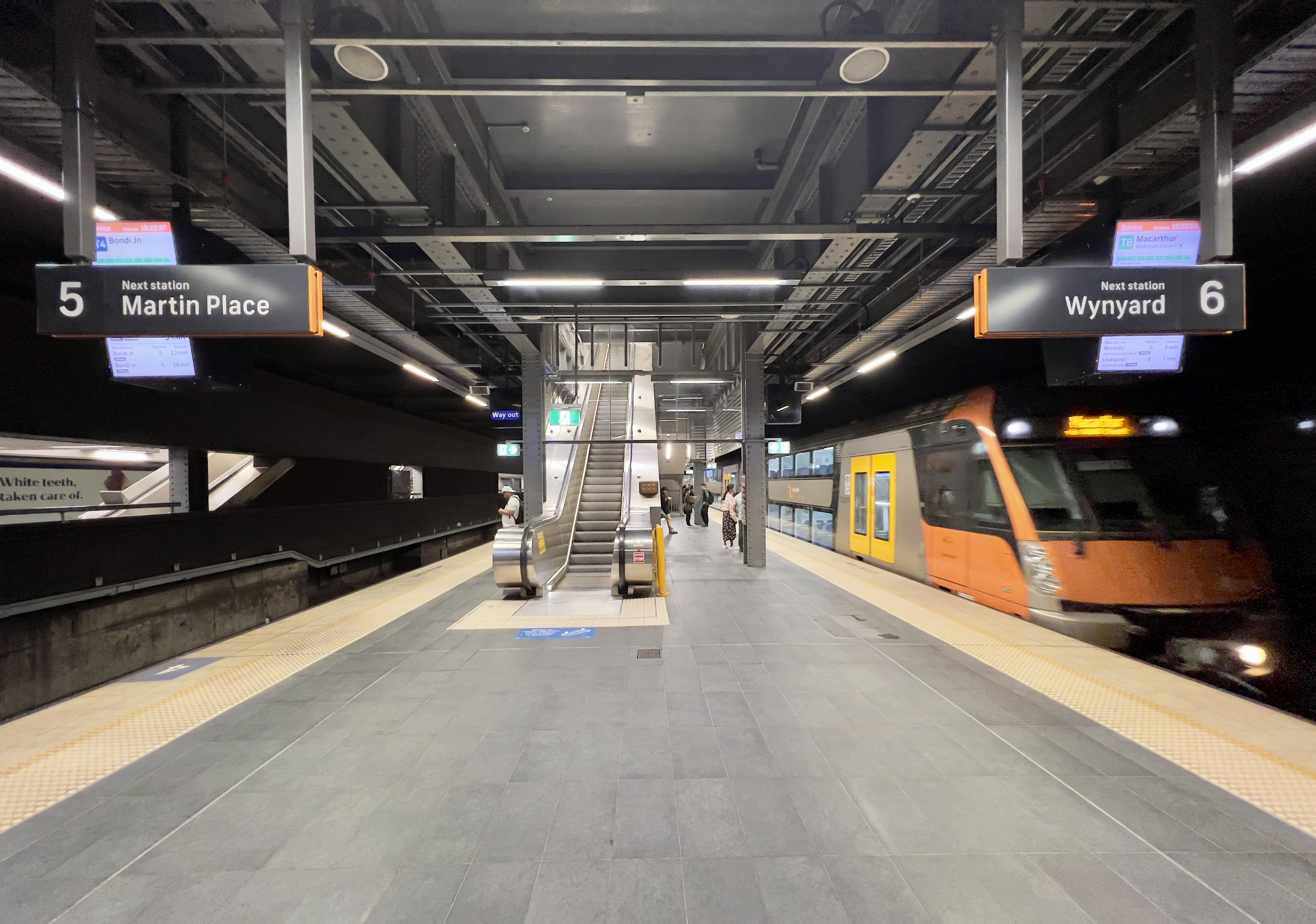
Town Hall, platforms 5 & 6

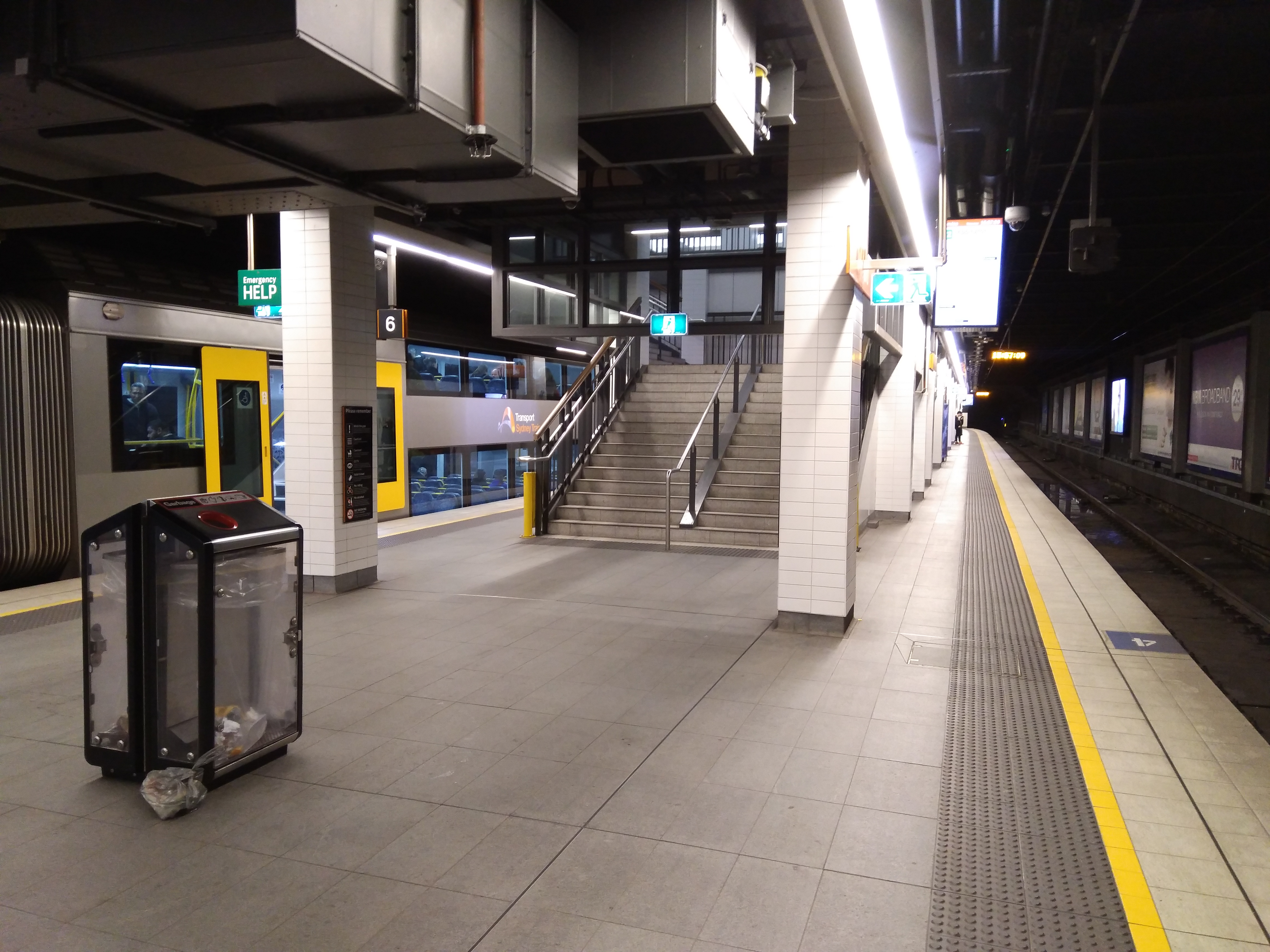
Wynyard, platforms 5 & 6

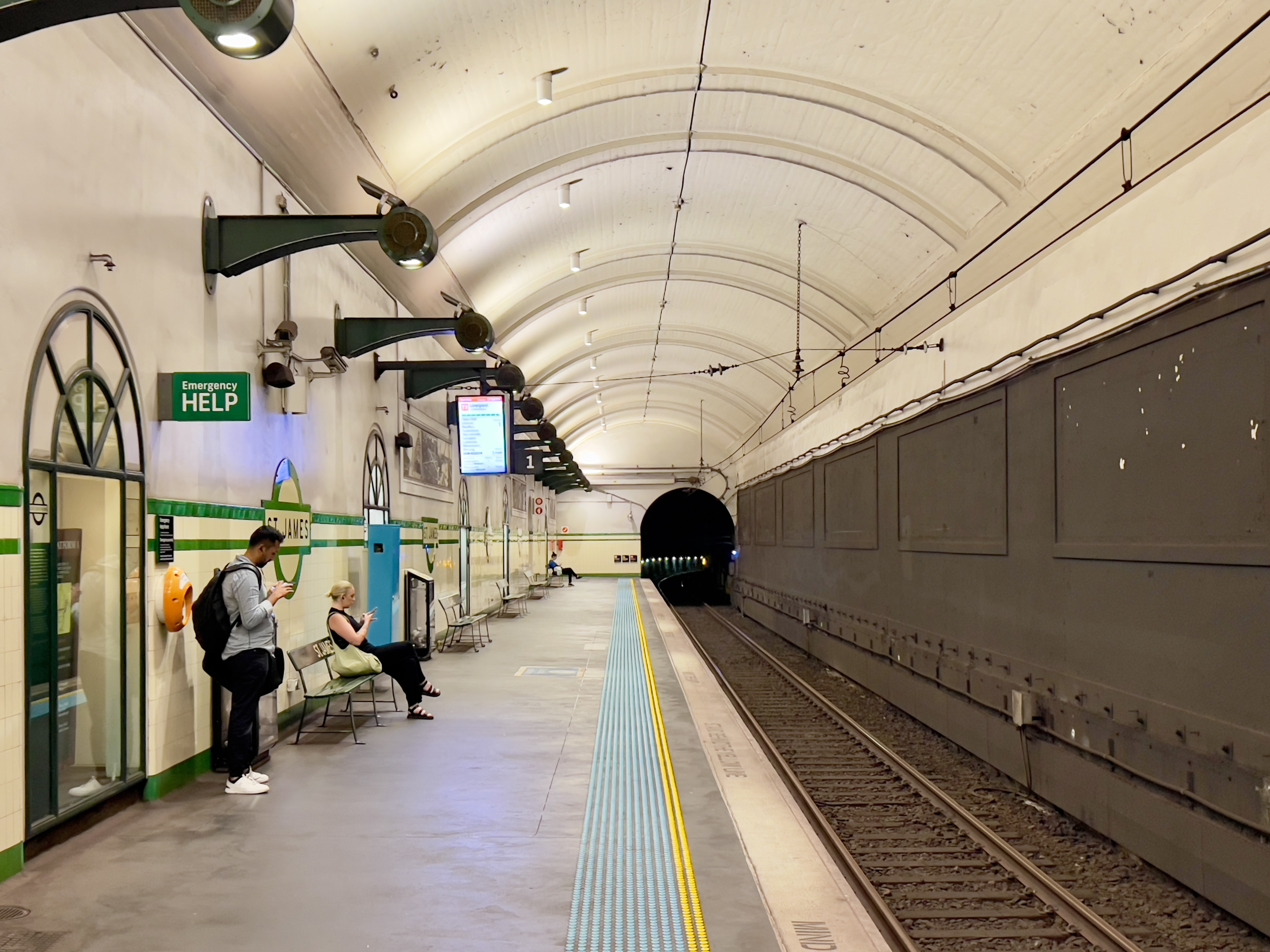
St James, platform 1

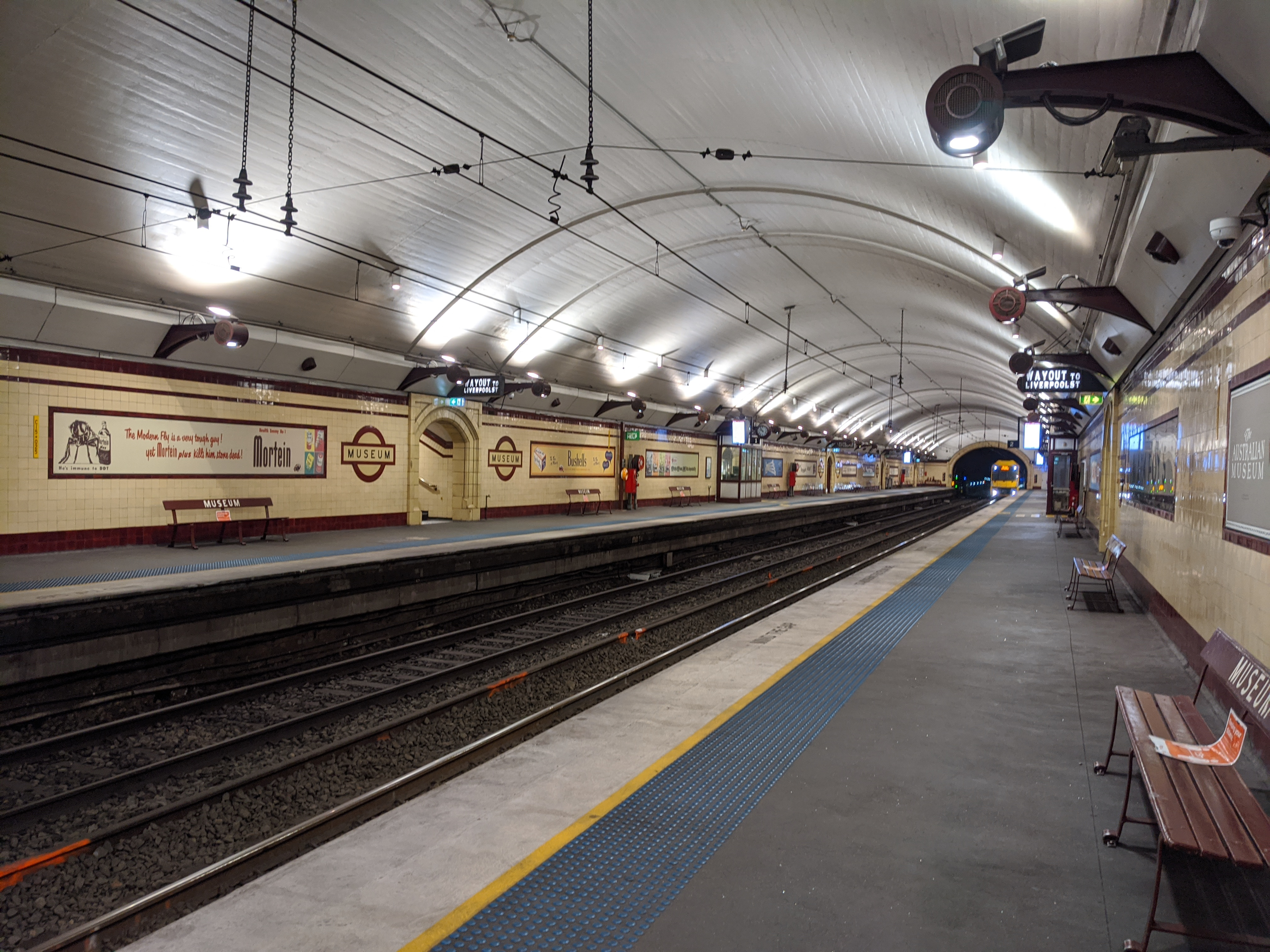
Museum, platforms 1 & 2

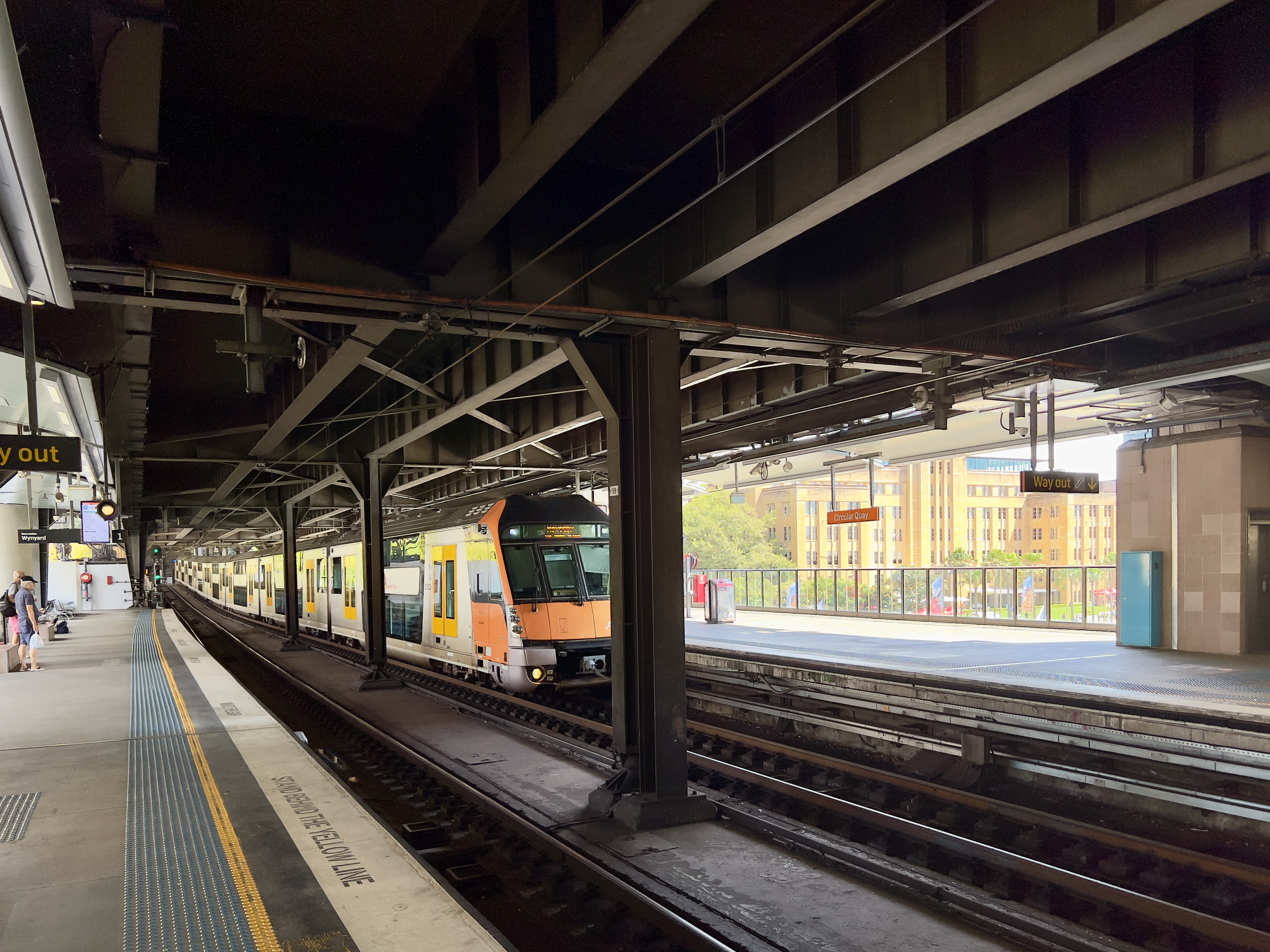
Circular Quay station

== See also ==
- List of Sydney Trains railway stations
- Railways in Sydney
- Rail transport in New South Wales
- Sydney underground railways
