= Cheltenham railway station, Sydney =

Railway station in Sydney, New South Wales, Australia

Cheltenham
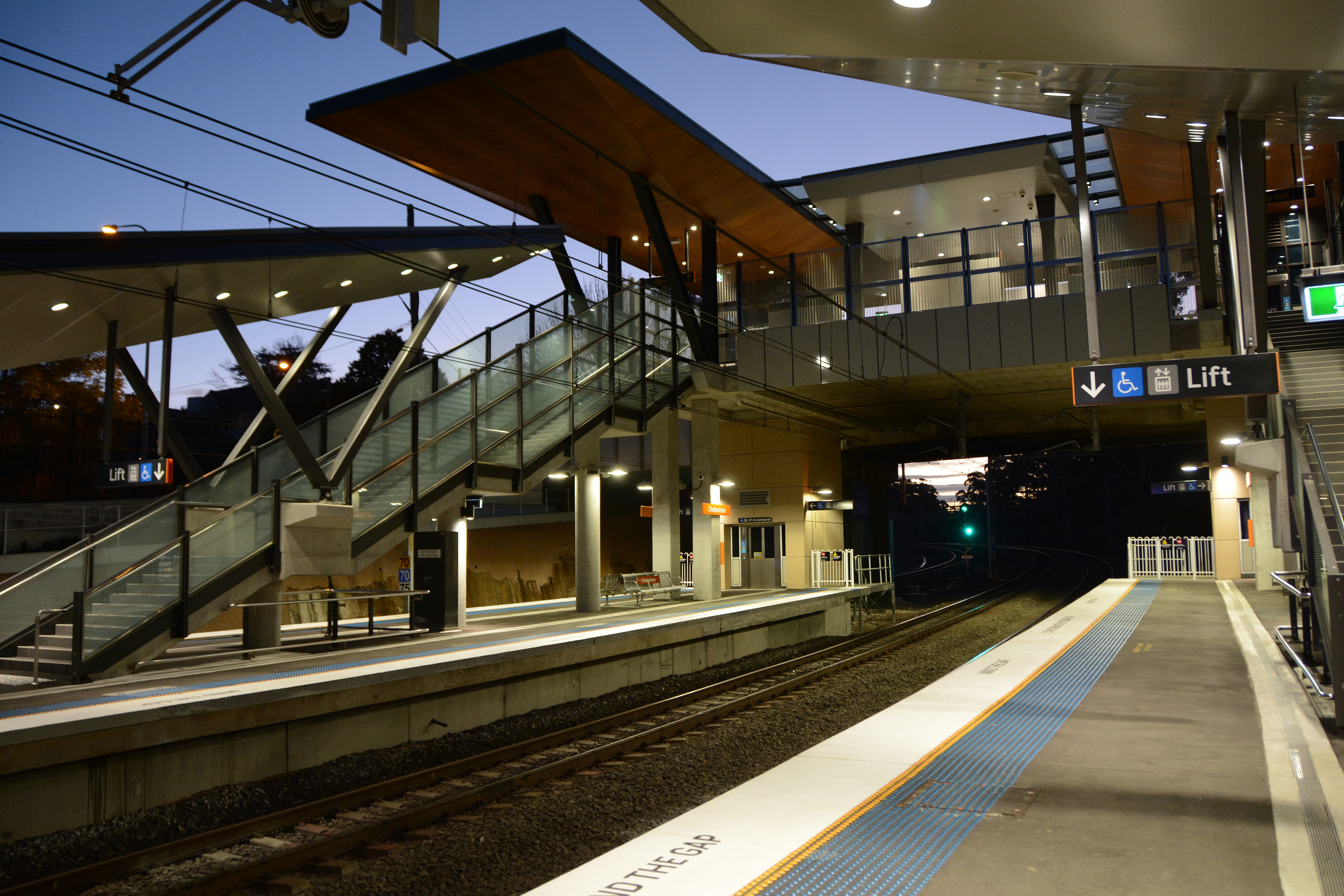
- North-west bound view from Platform 1, showing the pedestrian overpass and concourse, July 2016

General information
- Location: Sutherland Road, Cheltenham; Sydney, New South Wales; Australia
- Coordinates: 33°45′21″S 151°04′43″E
- Elevation: 114 metres (374 ft)
- Owner: Transport Asset Manager of NSW
- Operator: Sydney Trains
- Line: Main Northern
- Distance: 25.38 km (15.77 mi) from Central
- Platforms: 3 (1 side, 1 island)
- Tracks: 3

Construction
- Structure type: Ground
- Accessible: Yes

Other information
- Status: Weekdays: Staffed: 6am to 7pm: Weekends and public holidays: Unstaffed
- Station code: CHA
- Website: Transport for NSW

History
- Opened: 10 October 1898 (127 years ago)
- Rebuilt: 14 June 2016 (10 years ago)
- Electrified: Yes (1926)

Passengers
- 2025: 452,495 (year); 1,240 (daily) (Sydney Trains)
- Rank: 166

Services
Preceding station	Sydney Trains	Following station
Beecroft towards Hornsby	Northern Line	Epping towards Gordon via Central
Location

Cheltenham railway station is a suburban railway station located on the Main Northern line, serving the Sydney suburb of Cheltenham. It is served by Sydney Trains T9 Northern Line services.

== History ==
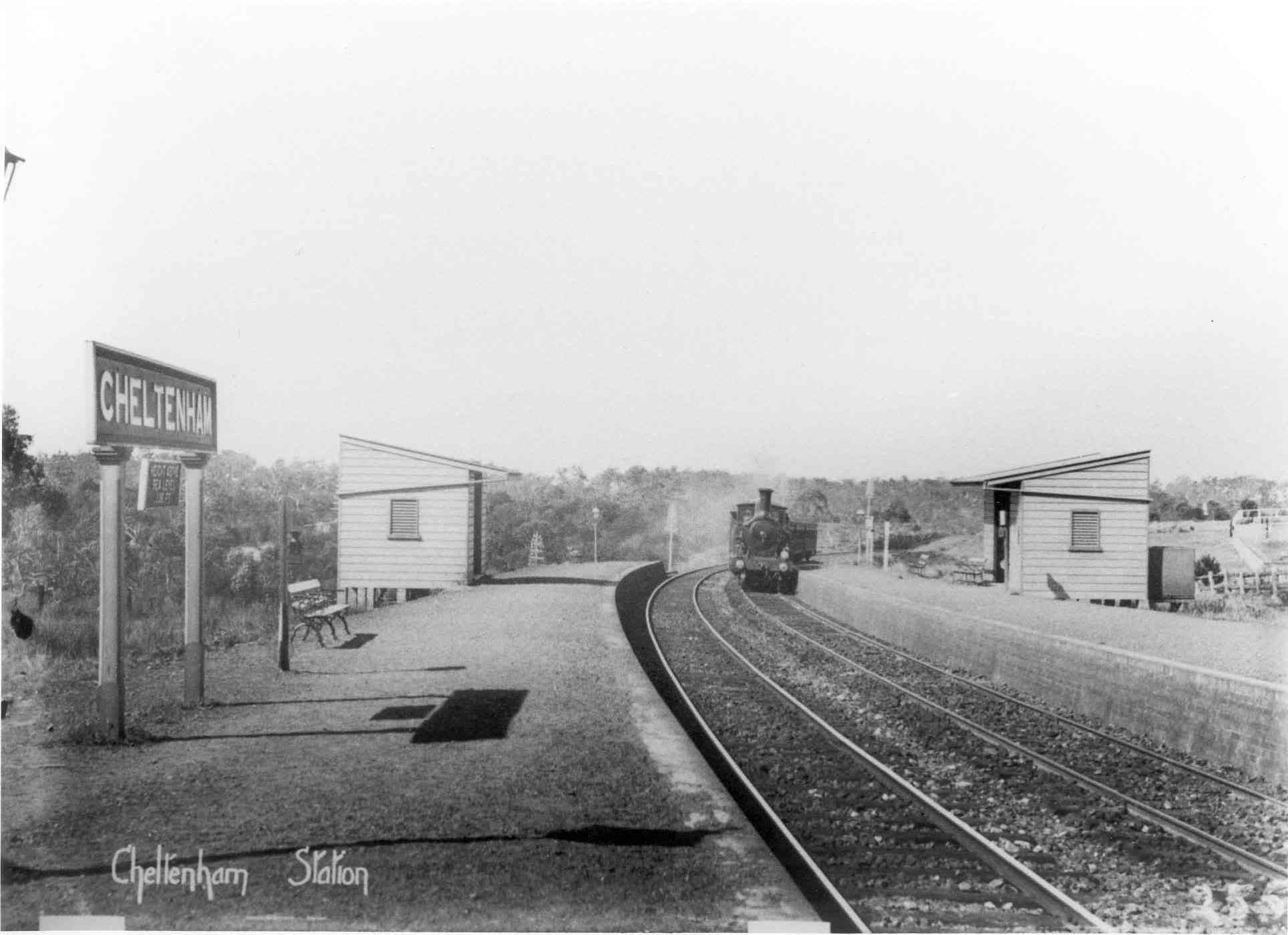
The station c.1900

Cheltenham station opened on 10 October 1898. It was established mainly due to pressure from William Chorley, whose home was located near the station. Chorley prevented commercial development near the station by placing covenants on the surrounding land, which he owned, and so Cheltenham is one of the few stations in Sydney with no shops nearby.

As part of the original plans for the North West Rail Link it was proposed to upgrade Cheltenham station to four tracks as part of the quadruplication of the line between Epping and Beecroft. There were however no plans for North West Rail Line services to stop at Cheltenham station. Due to complaints by local residents about noise and increased train services, the proposal to route the line through Cheltenham was scrapped, in favour of a tunnel starting at Epping station from the Epping to Chatswood line.

However, a second northbound track was built through the station around a decade later as part of the North Sydney Freight Corridor project, with the western platform becoming an island. The works included the construction of a new concourse with lifts, which opened on 31 August 2015. The new platform opened on 14 June 2016.

== Services ==
=== Platforms ===
The station is served by four trains per hour each way, with additional trains during weekday peak hours. During off-peak hours two of these four train services towards Central terminate at Chatswood.

Platform	Line	Stopping pattern	Notes
1	T9	Services to Gordon via Strathfield & North Sydney	
2	T9	All stations to Hornsby via Pennant Hills	
3		no booked services	most northbound freight trains pass through
