= Thornleigh railway station =

Railway station in Sydney, New South Wales, Australia

Thornleigh
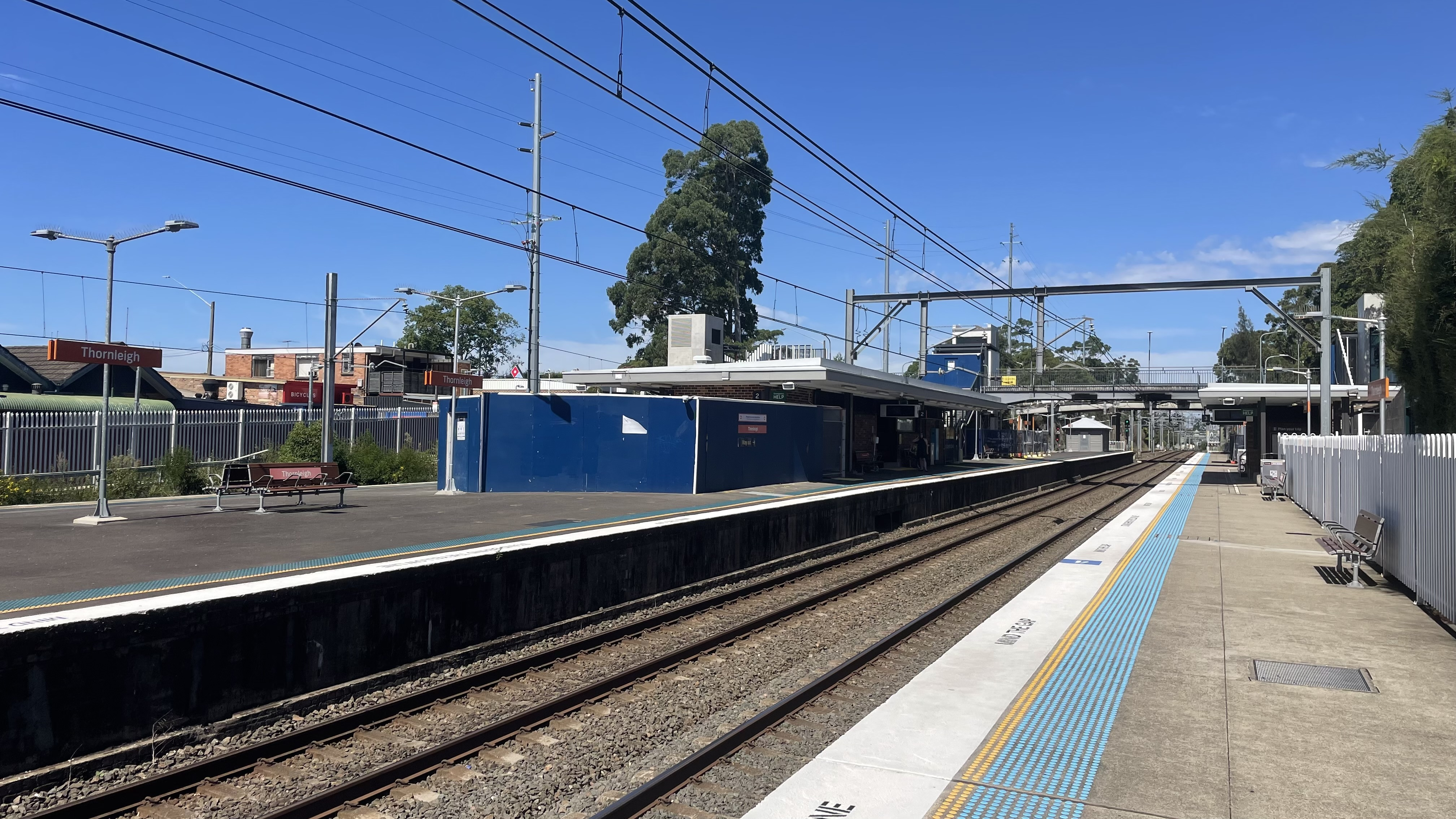
- Southbound view from Platform 3 with station access upgrades underway, in March 2023

General information
- Location: The Esplanade, Thornleigh, New South Wales; Australia
- Coordinates: 33°43′55″S 151°04′42″E
- Elevation: 173 metres (568 ft)
- Owner: Transport Asset Manager of NSW
- Operator: Sydney Trains
- Line: Main Northern
- Distance: 29.43 km (18.29 mi) from Central
- Platforms: 3 (1 island, 1 side)
- Tracks: 3
- Connections: Bus

Construction
- Structure type: Ground
- Accessible: Yes

Other information
- Status: Weekdays: Staffed: 6am to 7pm: Weekends and public holidays: Staffed: 8am to 4pm
- Station code: THO
- Website: Transport for NSW

History
- Opened: 17 September 1886 (140 years ago)
- Electrified: Yes (from 1926)

Passengers
- 2025: 876,933 (year); 2,403 (daily) (Sydney Trains)
- Rank: 135

Services
Preceding station	Sydney Trains	Following station
Normanhurst towards Hornsby	Northern Line	Pennant Hills towards Gordon via Central
Location

Thornleigh railway station is a suburban railway station located on the Main Northern line, serving the Sydney suburb of Thornleigh. It is served by Sydney Trains T9 Northern Line services.

== History ==
Thornleigh station opened on 17 September 1886. Platform 1 is located on a loop and does not have any booked passenger workings, while south of the station, the line has a loop on each side as far as Pennant Hills.

To the north of the station, a line previously branched off to a quarry.

The local control panel was closed on 12 November 2006, with control transferred to Strathfield Signal Box. Control of Thornleigh was again transferred to the new Homebush Signal Box in October 2008.

Train services running through to the city through the Epping-Chatswood Rail Link via Macquarie University and Chatswood ceased on 30 September 2018. The track closure was due to the planned introduction of the Metro North West Line which opened on 26 May 2019. Replacement buses, known as Station Link buses were offered from Epping and during peak hours from Beecroft station to access the stations between Epping and Chatswood, via Maquarie University.

The station received an upgrade with lifts and upgraded amenities in June 2023, as part of the third track project between Epping and Thornleigh.

== Services ==
=== Platforms ===
Platform	Line	Stopping pattern	Notes
1		no booked passenger services	
2	Northern Line (Sydney)	Services to Gordon via Strathfield & North Sydney	
3	Northern Line (Sydney)	services to Hornsby	

=== Transport links ===
CDC NSW operates two bus routes via Thornleigh station, under contract to Transport for NSW:

- 586: to Westleigh to Pennant Hills station
- 589: Hornsby station to Sydney Adventist Hospital

Thornleigh station is served by one NightRide route:

- N80: Hornsby station to Town Hall station

== Trackplan ==
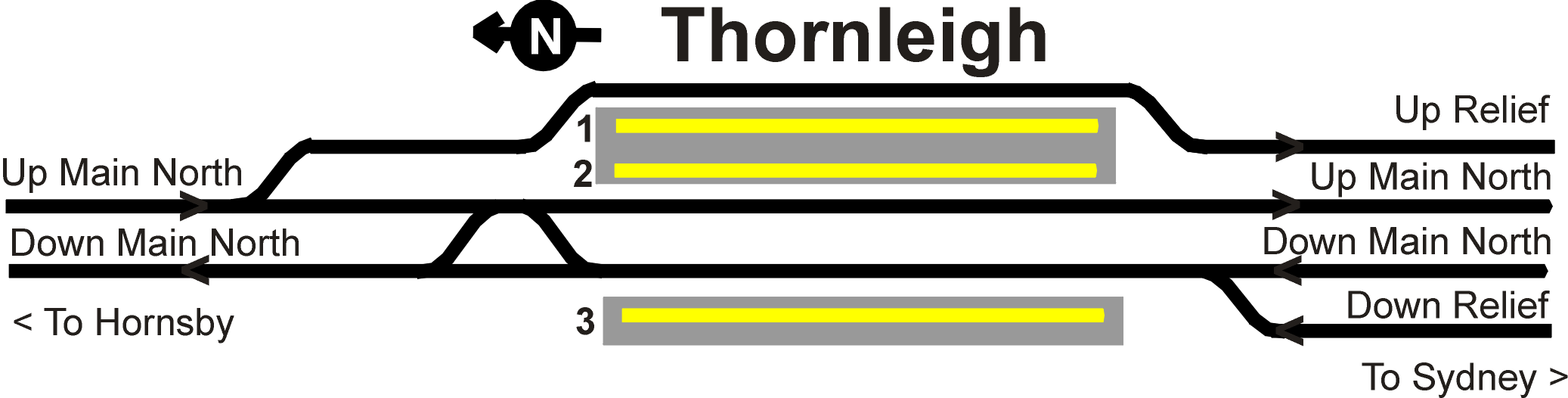
Track layout
