= Beecroft railway station =

Railway station in Sydney, New South Wales, Australia

Beecroft
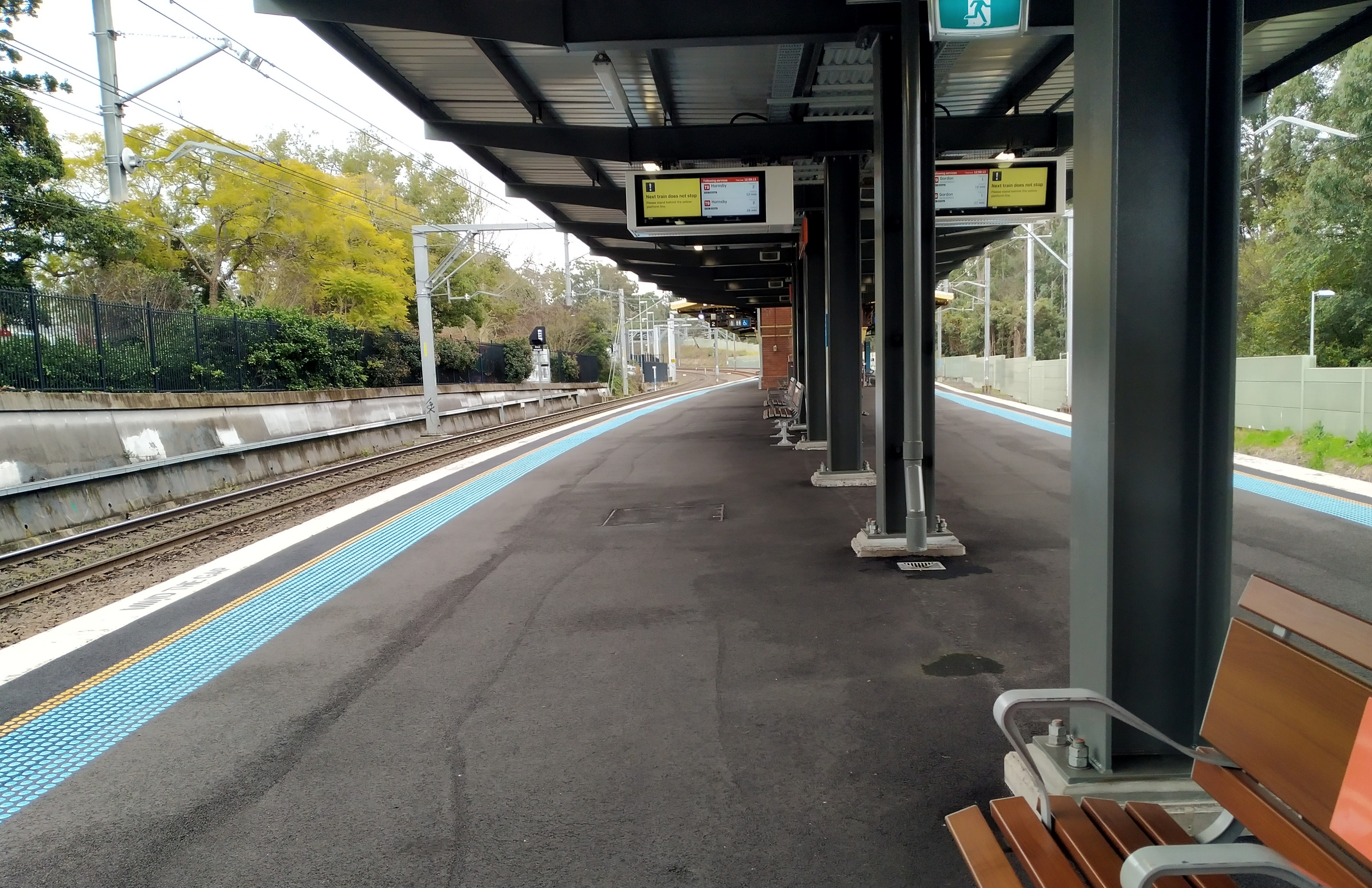
- Northbound view of the station from the platforms in August 2024

General information
- Location: Wongala Crescent, Beecroft, New South Wales; Australia
- Coordinates: 33°44′59″S 151°03′59″E
- Elevation: 141 metres (463 ft)
- Owner: Transport Asset Manager of NSW
- Operator: Sydney Trains
- Line: Main Northern
- Distance: 26.90 km (16.71 mi) from Central
- Platforms: 2 (1 island)
- Tracks: 3
- Connections: Bus

Construction
- Structure type: Ground

Other information
- Status: Weekdays: Staffed: 6am to 7pm: Weekends and public holidays: Staffed: 8am to 4pm
- Station code: BCF

History
- Opened: 17 September 1886 (139 years ago)
- Rebuilt: 7 March 1892 (134 years ago)
- Electrified: Yes (from 1926)

Passengers
- 2025: 707,952 (year); 1,940 (daily) (Sydney Trains, NSW TrainLink)
- Rank: 141

Services
Preceding station	Sydney Trains	Following station
Pennant Hills towards Hornsby	Northern Line	Cheltenham towards Gordon via Central
Location

Beecroft railway station is a suburban railway station located on the Main Northern line, serving the Sydney suburb of Beecroft. It is served by Sydney Trains T9 Northern Line services.

== History ==
The original Beecroft station opened on 17 September 1886 approximately adjacent to the current Beecroft tennis courts, relocating north to its present site on 7 March 1892. The disused down platform was demolished in the early 1990s. A disused dock platform for produce was located to the west of the platform.

As part of the North Sydney Freight Corridor project, an electrified passing loop opened to the west of the station in June 2016.

An upgrade to the station which involved lifts connecting the underpass with the platform was complete in December 2021.

== Services ==
=== Platforms ===
Platform	Line	Stopping pattern	Notes
1	T9	Services to Gordon via Strathfield & North Sydney	
2	T9	Services to Hornsby	

=== Transport links ===
Busways operates one bus route from Beecroft station, under contract to Transport for NSW:

- 553: to North Rocks Shopping Centre and West Pennant Hills

CDC NSW operates two routes from Beecroft station

- 635: to Castle Hill
- 651: Rouse Hill station to Epping station

Beecroft station is served by one NightRide route:

- N80: Hornsby station to Town Hall station
