= Concord West railway station =

Railway station in Sydney, New South Wales, Australia

Concord West
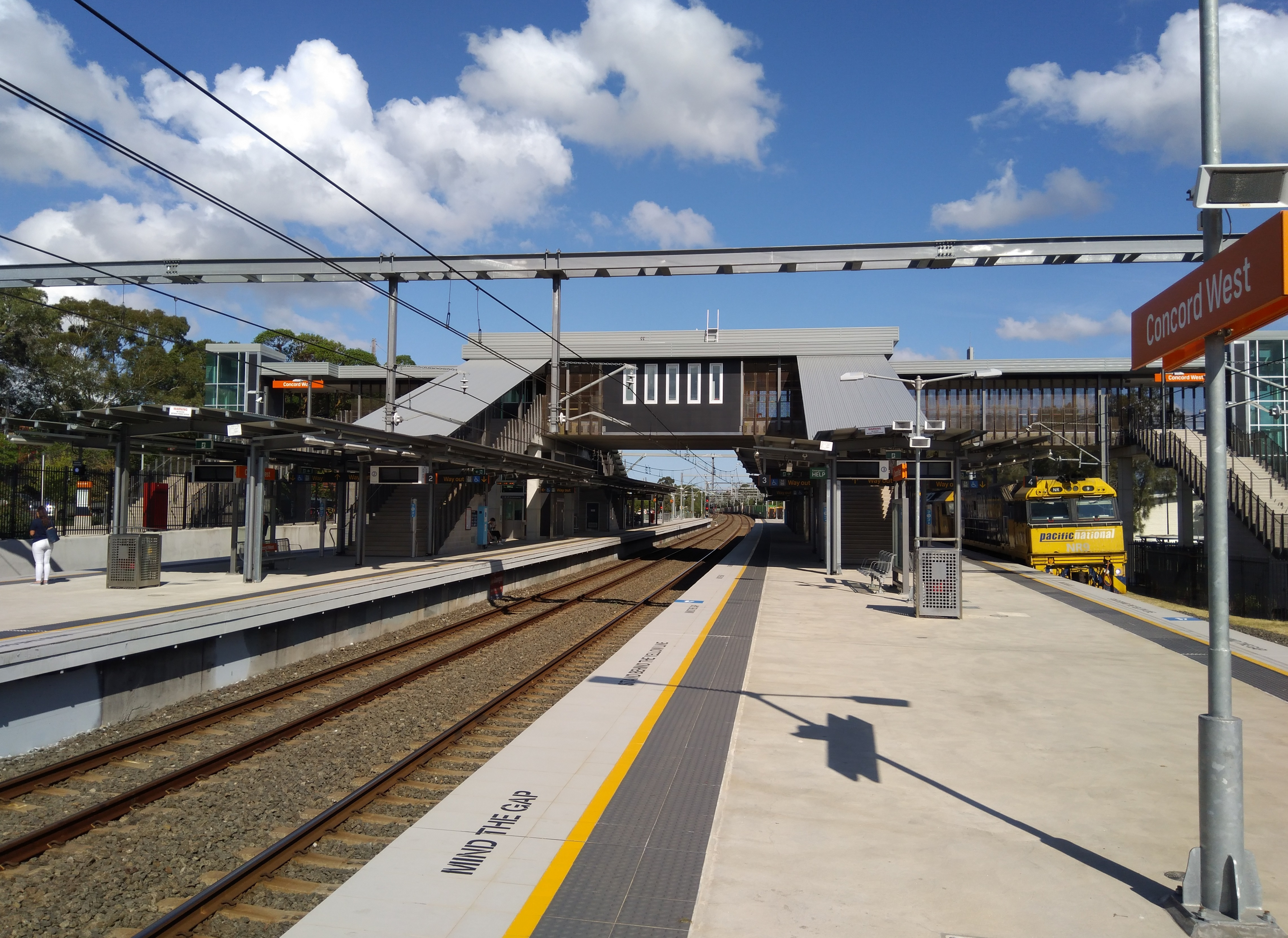
- Northbound view from Platform 2, showing the pedestrian footbridge and station concourse in April 2018

General information
- Location: Queen Street, Concord West; Sydney, New South Wales; Australia
- Coordinates: 33°50′55″S 151°05′08″E
- Elevation: 14 metres (46 ft)
- Owner: Transport Asset Manager of NSW
- Operator: Sydney Trains
- Line: Main North
- Distance: 14.54 km (9.03 mi) from Central
- Platforms: 4 (2 island)
- Tracks: 4

Construction
- Structure type: Ground
- Accessible: Yes

Other information
- Status: Weekdays: Staffed: 6am to 7pm: Weekends and public holidays: Staffed: 8am to 4pm
- Station code: CDW
- Website: Transport for NSW

History
- Opened: 1 September 1887 (138 years ago)
- Rebuilt: 26 October 2014 (11 years ago)
- Electrified: Yes (from January 1929)
- Former names: Concord (1887–1909)

Passengers
- 2025: 1,024,693 (year); 2,807 (daily) (Sydney Trains)
- Rank: 125

Services
Preceding station	Sydney Trains	Following station
Rhodes towards Hornsby	Northern Line	North Strathfield towards Gordon via Central
Location

Concord West railway station is a suburban railway station located on the Main North line, serving the Sydney suburb of Concord West. It is served by Sydney Trains T9 Northern Line services.

== History ==
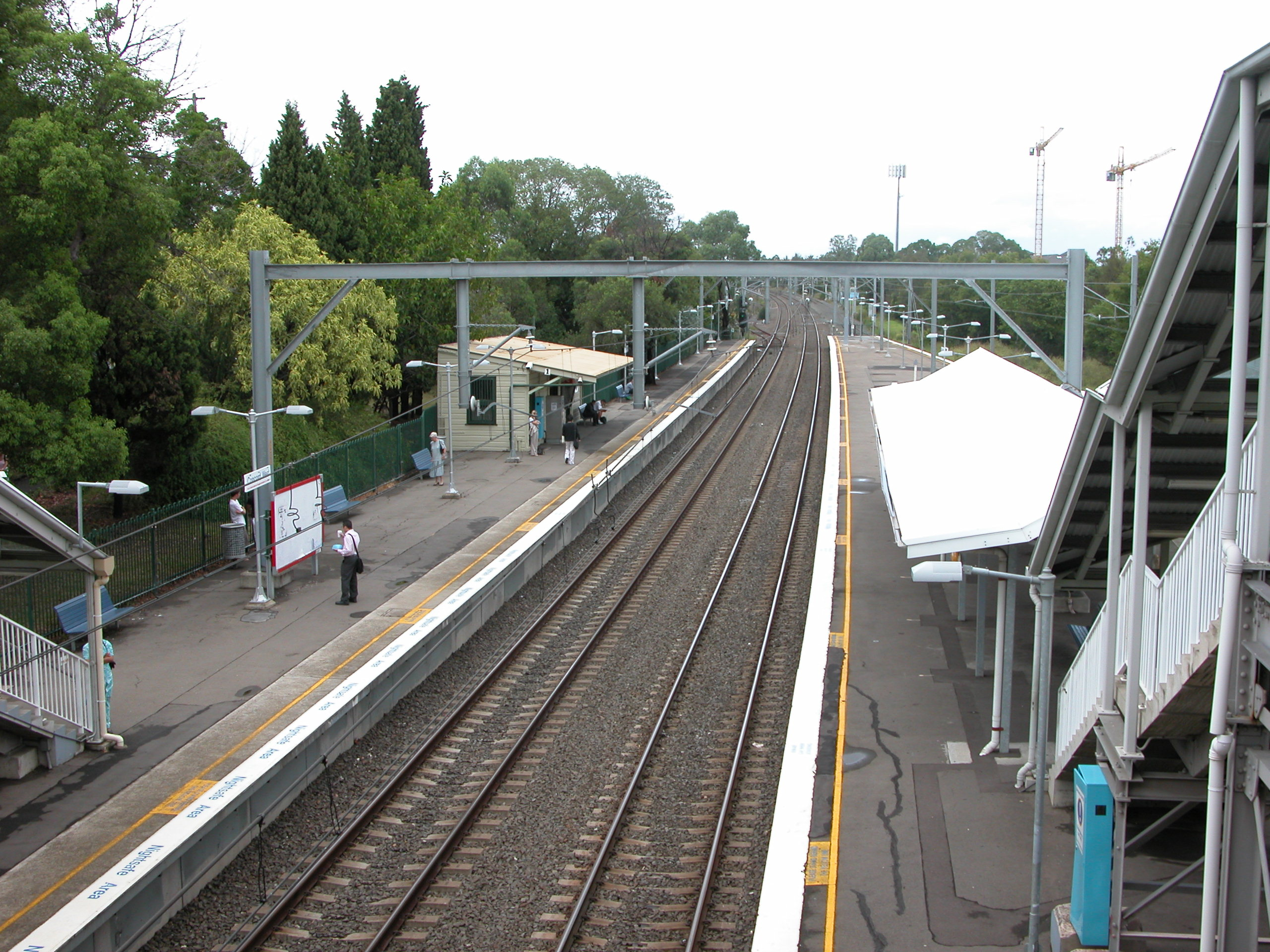
View of the station before the fourth platform was built

Concord West station was opened on 1 September 1887 as Concord. In March 1892, a second platform was added when the Main Northern line was duplicated. In June 1909, it was renamed Concord West. In 1911, a third line was laid to the west of the station and a signal box added, with a platform face added by 1940.

In 1998, the station was near the site of the 1998 Concord West derailment, which involved a Tangara T set derailing after excessive speed.

During the 2000 Olympics, Concord West was used as an alternate station to access Sydney Olympic Park for services from the Central Coast, with the platforms being extended to enable Intercity trains to make an additional stop. A temporary footbridge and an extra station exit were also provided, but were removed after the Olympics.

Platform 4 is signalled for bi-directional working, and for a time was used as the Sydney stopping point for the now-defunct Great South Pacific Express. It is primarily used by freight trains.

A fourth track was laid to the east of the existing tracks as part of the Northern Sydney Freight Corridor project. As part of these works, Concord West received an Easy Access upgrade and an additional platform. A new overhead concourse with lifts opened on 26 October 2014, replacing the existing concourse. The existing eastern platform was converted to an island platform. The new platform (numbered 1) opened on 9 June 2015 and the existing platforms were renumbered.

== Services ==
=== Platforms ===
Platform	Line	Stopping pattern	Notes
1		No booked services	Primarily used by passing freight trains
2	T9	Southbound services to Gordon via Strathfield & North Sydney	
3	T9	Northbound services to Hornsby	
4	T9	2 morning peak and 16 afternoon peak services to Hornsby	Primarily used by passing freight trains
