= Northern Sydney Freight Corridor =

Rail freight in New South Wales, Australia

- New South Wales Metropolitan Rail Area with two Northern Sydney Freight Corridor projects highlighted with black dotted lines

The Northern Sydney Freight Corridor (NSFC) was a project to improve access between Sydney and Newcastle for freight trains. Frequent passenger services operate on the Main Northern line between Strathfield and Broadmeadow. These passenger services take priority, meaning freight trains can be delayed and are subject to a curfew during peak hours. The Northern Sydney Freight Corridor aimed to reduce delays and increase capacity by providing additional train paths. The delivery of the NSFC projects was managed by Transport for NSW, with the exception of the Hexham freight loop which was delivered in June 2012 by the Australian Rail Track Corporation. The final stage was completed in June 2016.

== Previously existent infrastructure ==
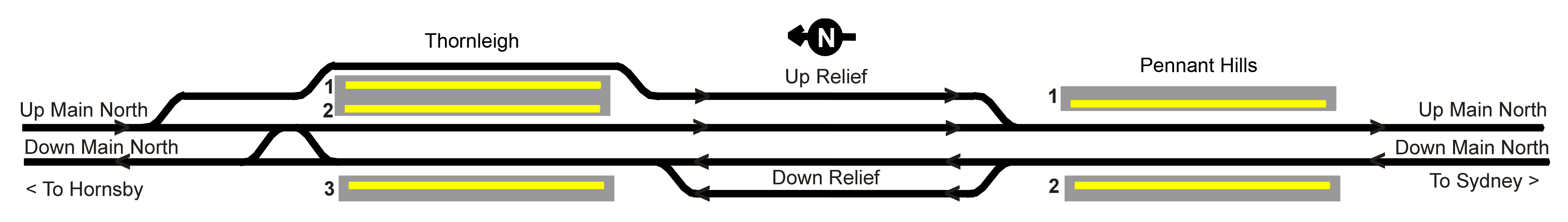
Former track layout through Pennant Hills and Thornleigh, Up Loop 1000m, Down Loop 400m

In addition to the two main tracks, there is an extra Down (northbound) line from North Strathfield to Rhodes and a disused extra Up (southbound) track from Concord West to North Strathfield. Between West Ryde and Epping, there is a quadruplicated section of track. Between Pennant Hills and Thornleigh, there are two loops, but these are too short to accommodate 1,500 metre trains.

As part of the Rail Clearways Program in August 2006, an additional platform was opened at Berowra, and in March 2009, an additional platform and passing loop was opened at Hornsby. These allow overtaking of terminating suburban trains. There are also refuges at Cowan and Broadmeadow capable of accommodating 1,500 metre trains. There are shorter loops at Hawkesbury River, Gosford, Morisset and Awaba but these are not capable of accommodating the longer freight trains.

== Projects ==
In December 2011, the New South Wales and Federal Governments signed an intergovernmental agreement to develop a series of NSFC projects. The Federal Government will contribute $840 million and the State Government $214 million. The projects were:

| Project | Description | Start date | Completion date |
|---|---|---|---|
| North Strathfield underpass | Grade separation for southbound freight trains heading to Flemington | 2013 | June 2015 |
| Epping to Pennant Hills third track | Third track for northbound trains climbing 1 in 40 grades | 2013 | June 2016 |
| Gosford passing loops | One passing loop in each direction to allow fast trains to overtake slower trains | 2013 | February 2015 |
| Hexham freight loop | Allows for more efficient entry into the NSFC for southbound freight trains | September 2011 | June 2012 |

=== North Strathfield underpass ===
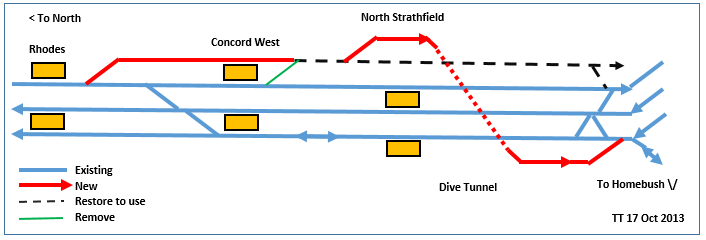
Dive tunnel from Rhodes to North Strathfield

The Main Northern Line commences at Strathfield where it diverges from the Main Suburban Line. The junction includes four tracks for services to or from the east and one track for services to or from the west. This westbound track is bi-directional and is mainly used by freight trains. Prior to the completion of the North Strathfield underpass, southbound trains that would be heading west were required to cross the northbound track via a flat junction.

The project removed the conflict by constructing an underpass beneath the Main Northern Line for southbound trains. In addition, 850 metres of disused southbound track between Concord West and Strathfield was brought back into use and extended 2.4 km northwards. Concord West received a new concourse and a fourth platform face. The line is electrified, although the only booked passenger journeys to work via the underpass are special event trains to Olympic Park. It opened on 9 June 2015.

=== Epping to Thornleigh third track ===
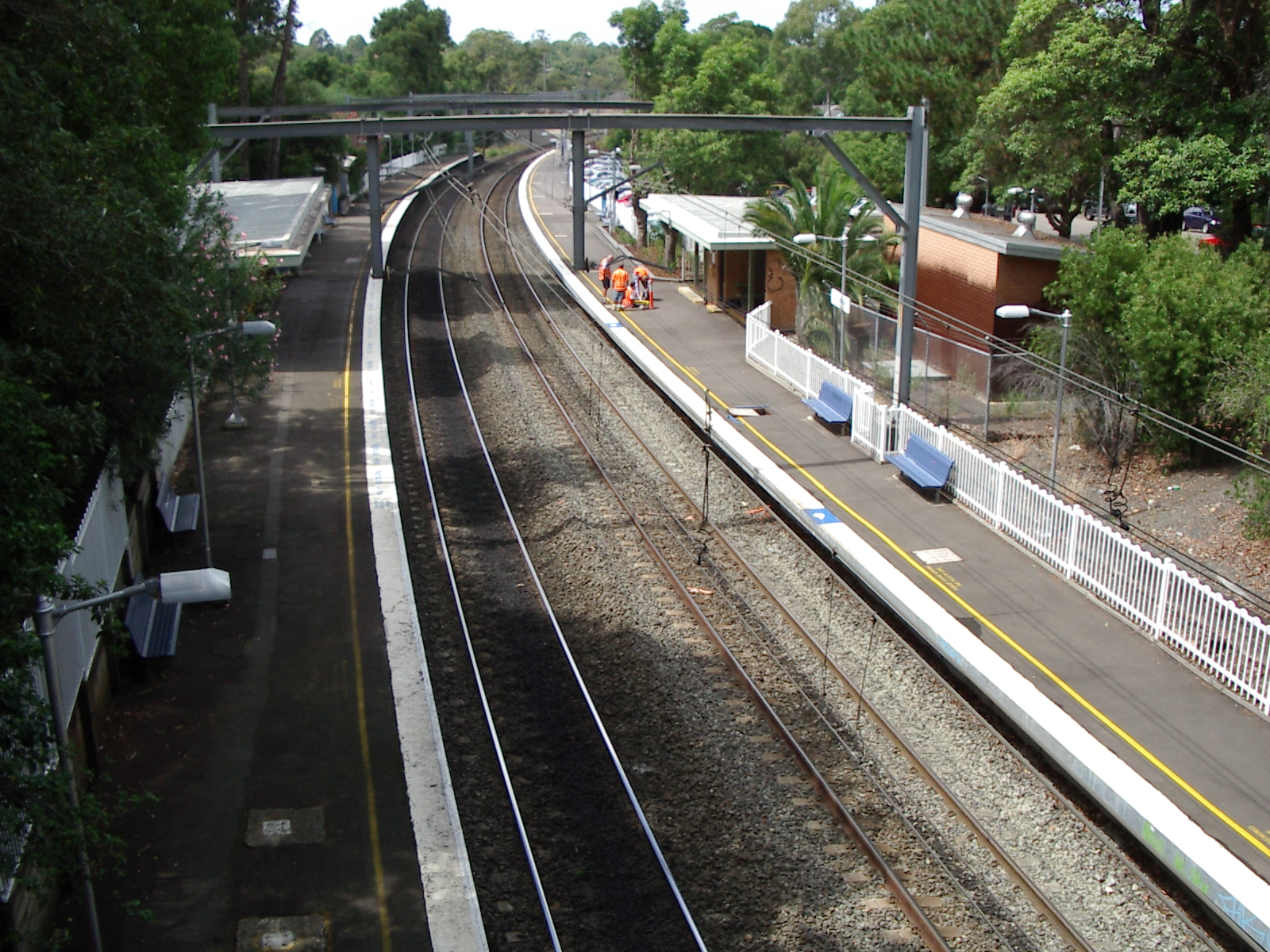
At Cheltenham a new footbridge was built with the new track passing to the right

The line from Epping to Thornleigh features a steep gradient slowing heavy freight trains. A third 6 kilometre track allows northbound freight trains to be passed by faster passenger trains. It connects to the existing northbound passing loop from Pennant Hills to Thornleigh. The project required the construction of a new bridge over the M2 Motorway and station modifications at Cheltenham, Beecroft and Pennant Hills, with Cheltenham receiving a new concourse. The line was electrified, and although additional platform faces were built at Cheltenham and Pennant Hills, it is not planned to be used by stopping passenger trains however will provide for some flexibility in case of service disruptions. The new track opened on 14 June 2016.

=== Gosford refuge loops ===
This project involved the construction of two passing loops and six bridges on either side of the existing rail line between Gosford and Narara stations. The northbound line was electrified allowing NSW TrainLink services to use it. It opened on 23 February 2015.

=== Hexham refuge loop ===
This project completed in June 2012, involved construction of a 1,500 metre refuge loop on the northern side of the Sydney bound main line west of Hexham station.

== See also ==
- Southern Sydney Freight Line
- Transport in Sydney in the 2010s
