= Pennant Hills railway station =

Railway station in Sydney, New South Wales, Australia

Pennant Hills
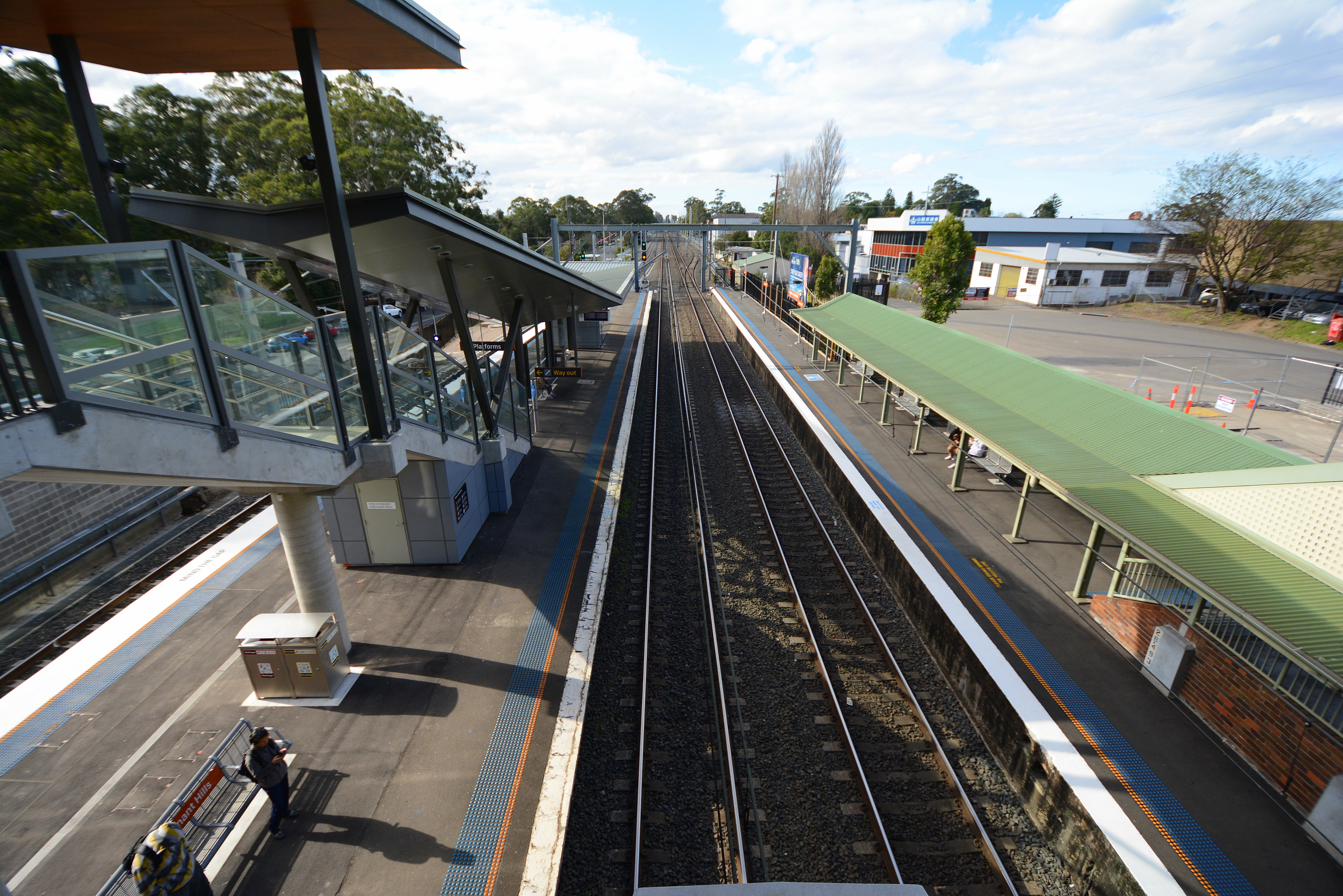
- Northbound view of Platforms 1 and 2 in August 2016

General information
- Location: Railway Street, Pennant Hills, New South Wales; Australia
- Coordinates: 33°44′17″S 151°04′21″E
- Elevation: 169 metres (554 ft)
- Owner: Transport Asset Manager of NSW
- Operator: Sydney Trains
- Line: Main Northern
- Distance: 28.58 km (17.76 mi) from Central
- Platforms: 3 (1 side, 1 island)
- Tracks: 3
- Connections: Bus

Construction
- Structure type: Ground
- Accessible: Yes

Other information
- Status: Staffed
- Station code: PNT
- Website: Transport for NSW

History
- Opened: 17 September 1886 (140 years ago)
- Rebuilt: 2016
- Electrified: Yes (from 1926)

Passengers
- 2025: 996,880 (year); 2,731 (daily) (Sydney Trains)
- Rank: 128

Services
Preceding station	Sydney Trains	Following station
Thornleigh towards Hornsby	Northern Line	Beecroft towards Gordon via Central
Location

Pennant Hills railway station is a suburban railway station located on the Main Northern line, serving the Sydney suburb of Pennant Hills. It is served by Sydney Trains T9 Northern Line services.

== History ==
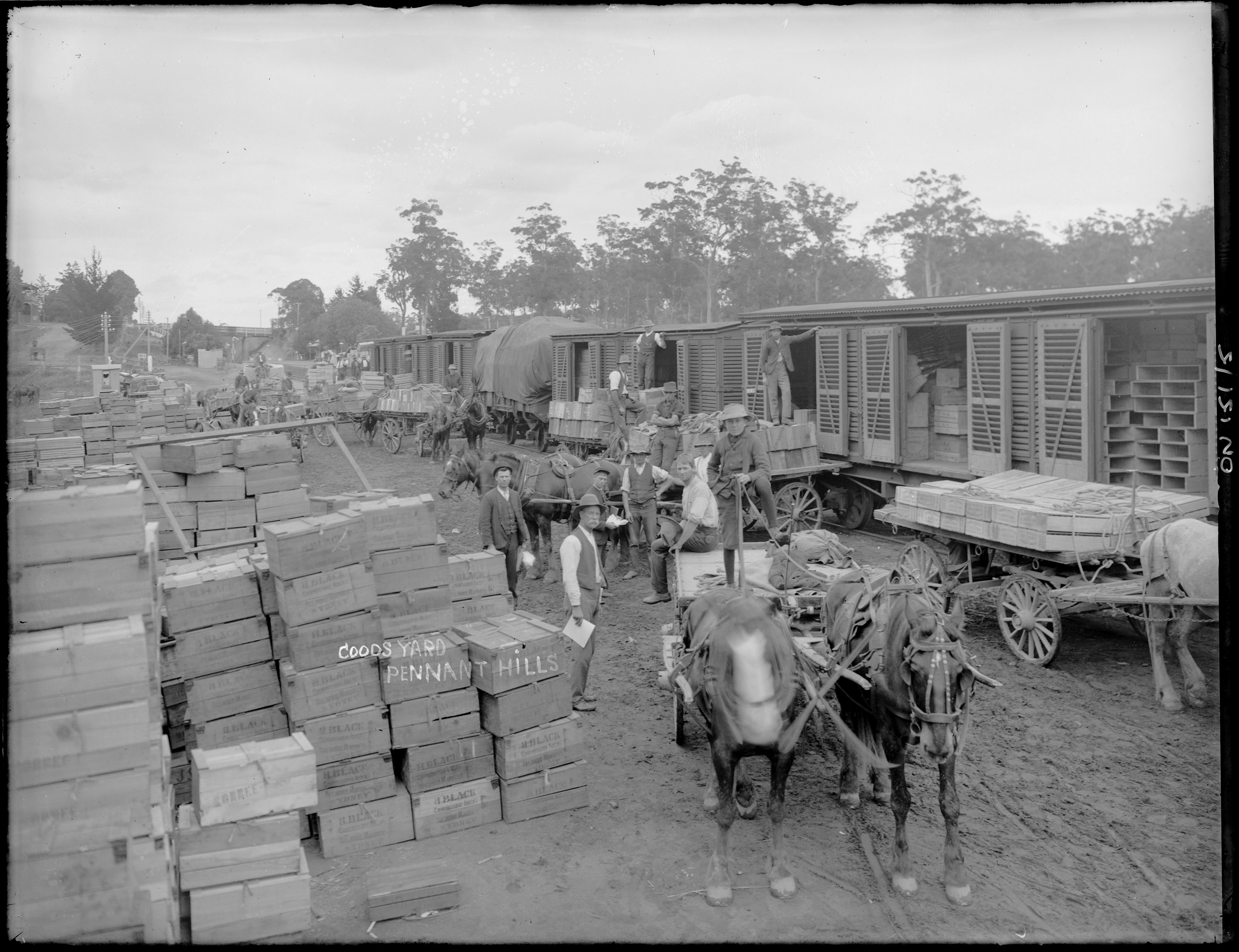
Delivering cases of fruit from local orchards, 1911-1916

Pennant Hills station opened on 17 September 1886. Immediately north of Pennant Hills, a short four track section of the Main Northern line begins which runs to the next station at Thornleigh.

The present day footbridge was built in May 1991 with a standard non-enclosed design and an awning covering the entire structure. However, it was modified shortly later around 1995-1998 to include lift shafts and glass panels enclosing the structure. As a result Pennant Hills received an easy access upgrade, becoming one of the first low-patronage stations in Sydney to receive wheelchair access, along with Waverton. The footbridge was modified for a third time in 2016, with the western most lift shaft modernised at the base, a third lift shaft constructed, and new stairs constructed to the platform. Nearby Thornleigh and Normanhurst did not receive wheelchair access until 2023.

As part of the North Sydney Freight Corridor project, an electrified passing loop was built behind the western platform where it joined the existing loop. As part of these works the western platform was converted to an island. The new platform opened on 14 June 2016.

== Services ==
=== Platforms ===
Platform	Line	Stopping pattern	Notes
1	Northern Line (Sydney)	Services to Gordon via Strathfield & North Sydney	
2	Northern Line (Sydney)	services to Hornsby	
3		No booked passenger services	

== Trackplan ==
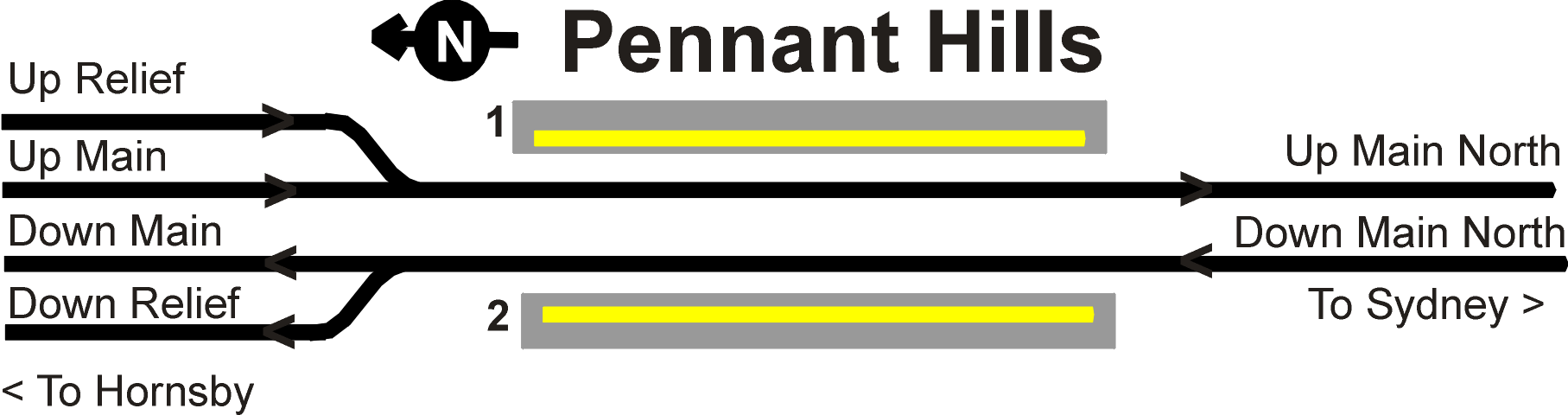
Track layout prior to the Northern Sydney Freight Corridor project

== Transport links ==
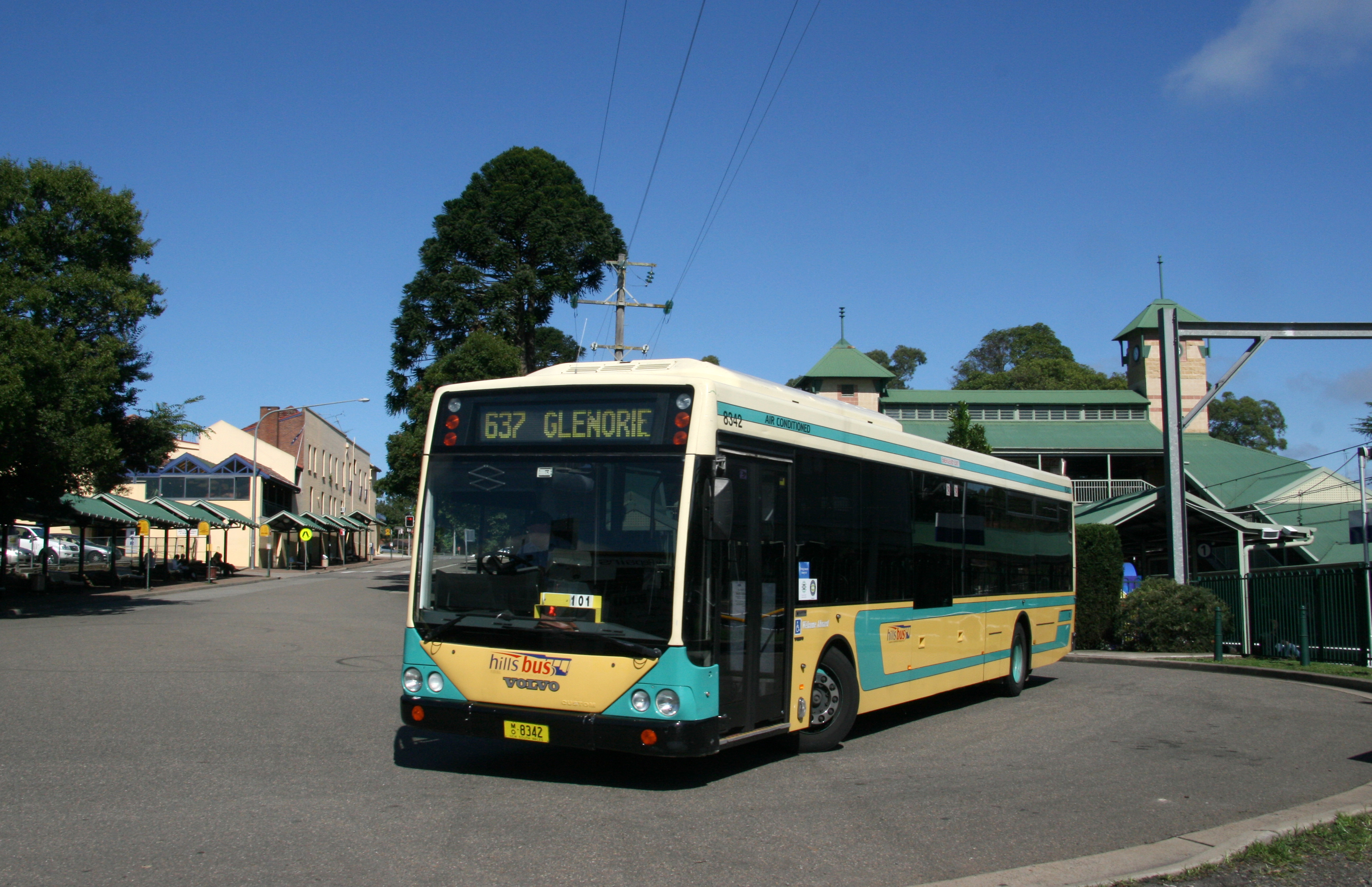
A Hillsbus bus turning around at Railway Street outside the station, April 2009

CDC NSW operates eight bus routes via Pennant Hills station, under contract to Transport for NSW:

- 586: to Westleigh via Thornleigh
- 590: to Hornsby
- 600: to Parramatta station via Castle Hill
- 625: to Parramatta station via Carlingford
- 626: to Kellyville via Cherrybrook
- 632: to Rouse Hill via Norwest and Castle Hill
- 633: to Rouse Hill via Kellyville and Castle Hill
- 638: to Galston

Pennant Hills station is served by one NightRide route:

- N80: Hornsby station to City (Town Hall)
