= T9 Northern Line =

Rail service in Sydney, Australia

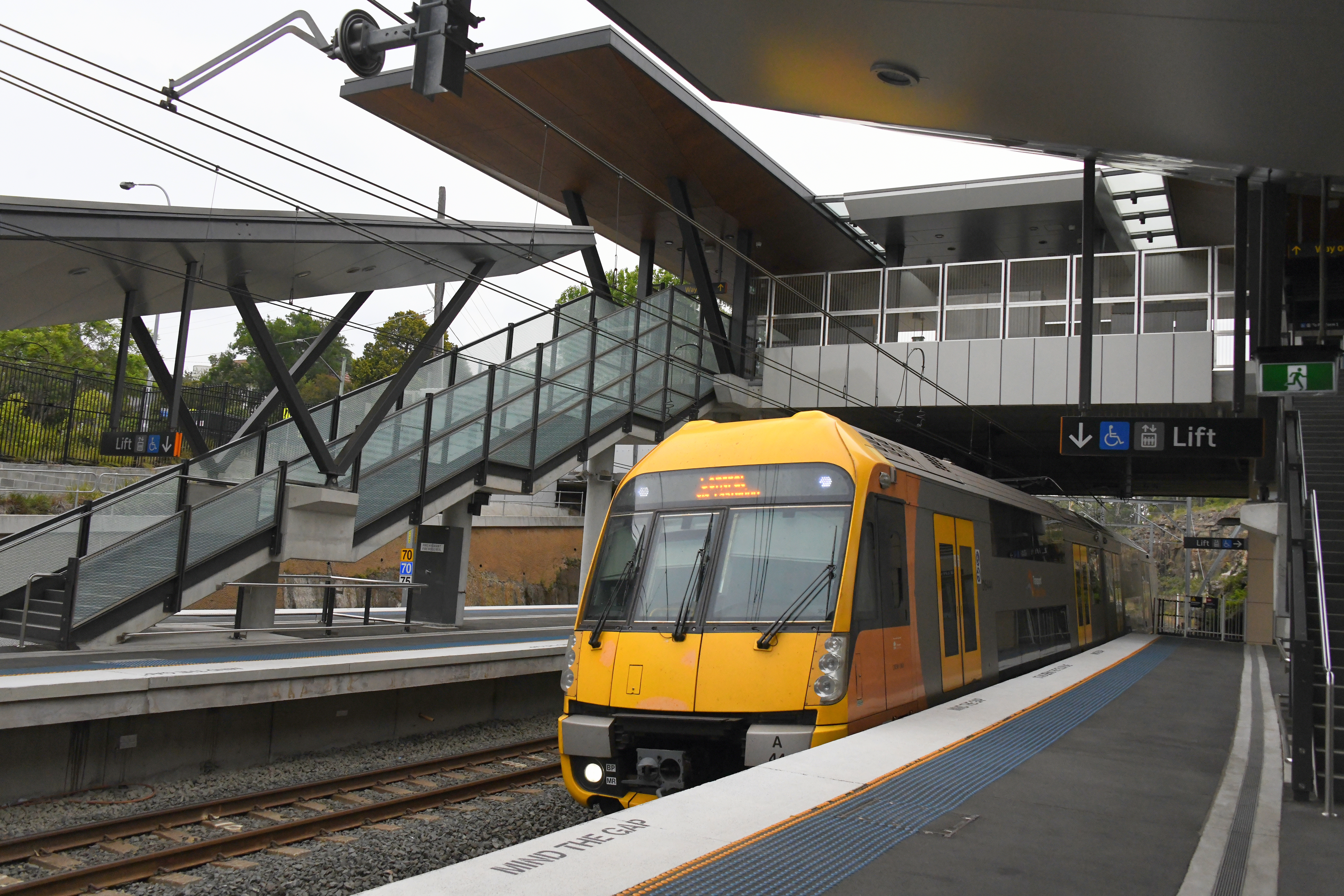
- An A set at Cheltenham station

Overview
- Service type: Commuter rail service
- Status: Active
- Locale: Sydney
- Current operator: Sydney Trains

Route
- Lines used: Main North; Main Suburban; North Shore

Technical
- Rolling stock: H, T, A and B sets
- Track gauge: 1,435 mm (4 ft 8 1/2 in) standard gauge
- Timetable number: T9
Sydney rail network
Sydney Trains suburban services
T1 North Shore & Western
T2 Leppington & Inner West
T3 Liverpool & Inner West
T4 Eastern Suburbs & Illawarra
T5 Cumberland
T6 Lidcombe & Bankstown
T7 Olympic Park
T8 Airport & South
T9 Northern
Sydney Metro
M1 Metro North West & Bankstown

The T9 Northern Line is a suburban rail service operated by Sydney Trains, serving the Northern and parts of the Inner West suburbs of Sydney.

Since 2019, the line has been numbered T9 and is coloured red on maps and wayfinding information.

== History ==
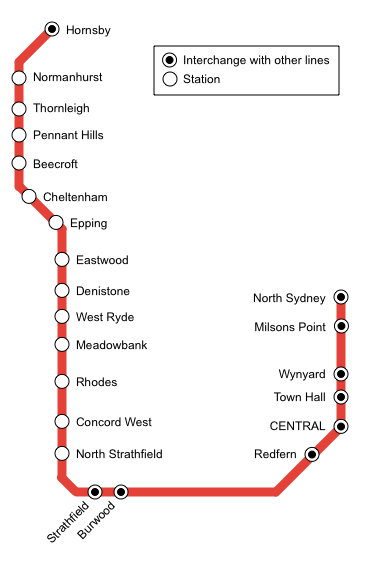
Diagram of the Northern Line prior to 2009

=== Original incarnation (until 2013) ===
The traditional Northern Line was the suburban portion of the Main North railway line (Strathfield to Hornsby) which opened in 1886 and was electrified in 1926. When the Sydney Harbour Bridge was opened, it connected railway services from the Main North line and the City underground onto the North Shore line.

Passenger services used to operate as the Main North Line (same name as the physical railway line) and was colour coded red on railway maps. It operated all the way to Cowan, until the service was truncated to Berowra in January 1992. The service, along with the North Shore Line service (yellow), later also ran along the North Shore railway line towards the City via the Harbour Bridge, forming a continuous loop via Strathfield, Epping and back to Hornsby.

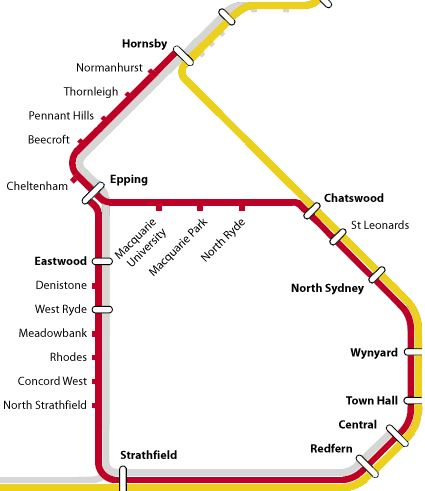
Diagram of the Northern Line between 2009 and 2013. The line is marked in red.

By 2006, the Northern Line was shown as running between Hornsby and North Sydney on network maps, no longer continuing up the North Shore. However, the majority of services actually continued past North Sydney as before. In October 2009, the Northern Line was changed to serve the newly opened Epping to Chatswood Rail Link (ECRL). The line was changed to operate in a spiral shape, starting from Hornsby, entering the ECRL at Epping, emerging at Chatswood and returning to Epping via the City and Strathfield.

=== Part of T1 (2013 to 2019) ===
In October 2013, the Northern Line, North Shore Line and Western line were merged to form the T1 North Shore, Northern & Western Line, which was colour coded yellow.

On weekdays, trains from the upper Northern Line (Hornsby via Macquarie University) joined up with the Western Line trains towards Richmond or Emu Plains, while trains from the lower Northern Line (Epping via Strathfield) joined up with the North Shore Line trains towards Hornsby or Berowra. On weekends, trains ran similar to prior to merger, where the lower Northern Line trains from Epping continue onto the upper Northern Line trains at Chatswood into Hornsby via Macquarie University.

In September 2018, the Epping to Chatswood line closed in order to be converted to metro standards as part of the Sydney Metro Northwest project. As a result, the service pattern in the 2006 timetable from Hornsby to Central via Strathfield was reinstated.

=== Reincarnation (since 2019) ===
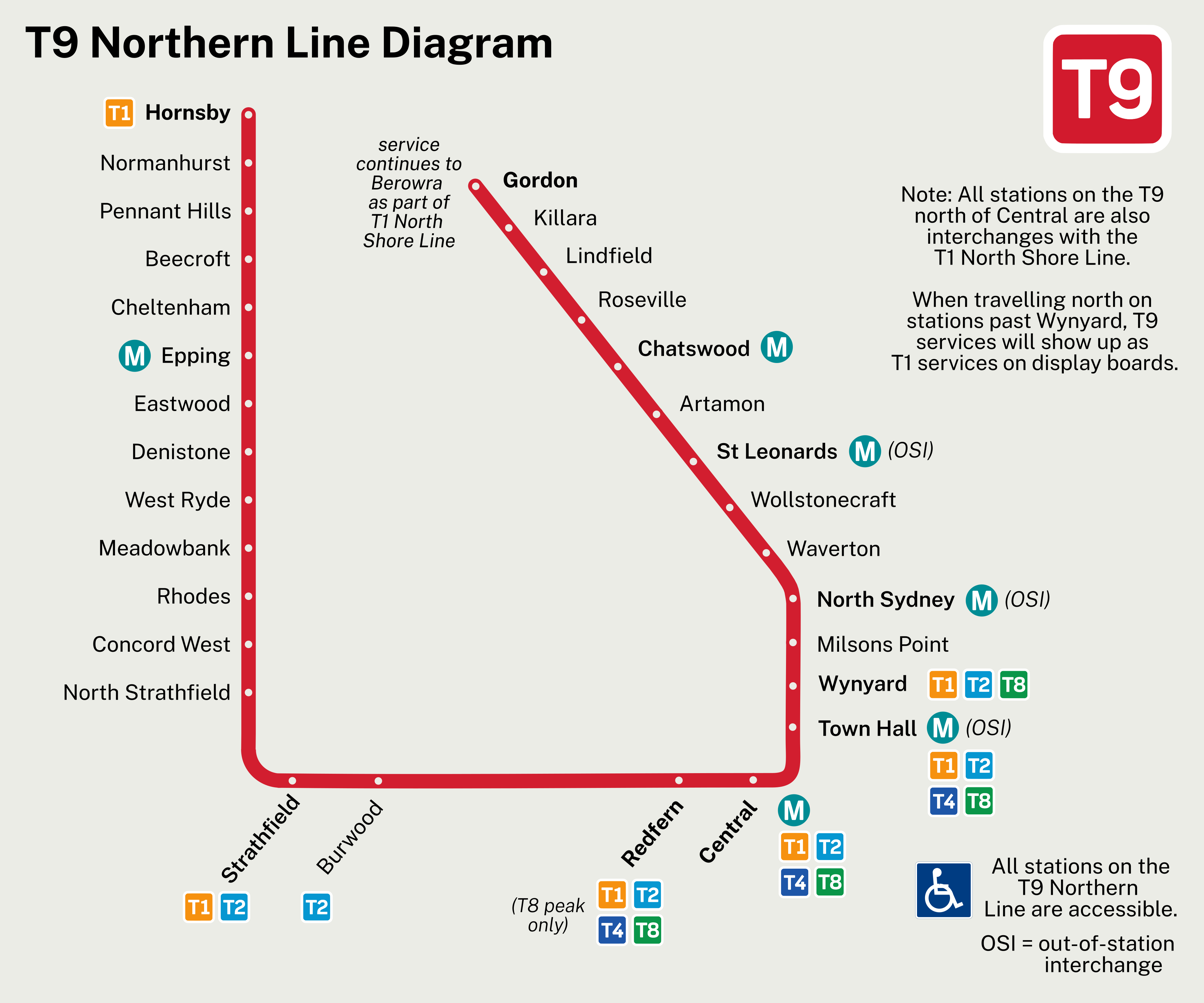
Diagram of the T9 Northern Line post-2019

On 28 April 2019, as part of the integration with the Sydney Metro Northwest, the Northern Line branch was spin-off from the T1 Line and became a separate T9 Northern Line, though using the same rolling stock. The new line runs from Hornsby to Gordon via Strathfield (and vice-versa). The separated line runs a similar route to the pre-2009 incarnation of the line. It is also similarly colour-coded red.

== Route ==
The line begins at Hornsby – a junction station with the North Shore Line. The line heads south to Strathfield via Epping using the Main North Line, crossing the Parramatta River between Rhodes and Meadowbank. At Strathfield, trains usually head onto a flyover over the 'Main lines', before heading east onto the Main Suburban Railway, usually using the middle 'Suburban' pair of the six tracks between Redfern and Strathfield. Trains pass through Redfern and Central, then through the western limb of the City Circle before heading across the Harbour Bridge. Trains then head north along the North Shore towards Gordon, where they usually terminate. Some services continue as T1 North Shore line trains (to Hornsby or Berowra).

For off-peak and weekend services, the T9 generally runs from Hornsby to Gordon via Epping, Strathfield and the North Shore. However, the route is split into two distinct stopping patterns during the morning and afternoon peak:

Anti-clockwise direction:

- All stations from Hornsby to Epping, then Eastwood, West Ryde, Meadowbank, Rhodes, Strathfield, Burwood and then finally terminating at Central (Grand Concourse).
- All stations from Epping to Strathfield, then Redfern, Central, then all stations to Gordon, then all stations to Hornsby or Berowra (continuing as T1 North Shore line).

Clockwise direction:

- All stations from Gordon to Redfern, then Strathfield, and then all stations to Epping.
- Central (Grand Concourse), then Burwood, Strathfield, Rhodes, Meadowbank, West Ryde, Eastwood, Epping, and then all stations to Hornsby.

T9 stations
Name	Distance from Central	Opened	Railway line	Serving suburbs	Other lines
Gordon	17.1 km	1890	North Shore	Gordon	T1 North Shore & Western Line
Killara	15.9 km	1899	North Shore	Killara, East Killara	T1 North Shore & Western Line
Lindfield	14.6 km	1890	North Shore	Lindfield, East Lindfield	T1 North Shore & Western Line
Roseville	13.3 km	1890	North Shore	Roseville	T1 North Shore & Western Line
Chatswood	11.7 km	1890	North Shore	Chatswood	T1 North Shore & Western Line M1 Metro North West & Bankstown Line
Artarmon	10.3 km	1898	North Shore	Artarmon	T1 North Shore & Western Line
St Leonards	8.4 km	1890	North Shore	St Leonards, Naremburn, Crows Nest, Greenwich, Artarmon	T1 North Shore & Western Line
Wollstonecraft	7.2 km	1893	North Shore	Wollstonecraft, Greenwich	T1 North Shore & Western Line
Waverton	6.1 km	1893	North Shore	Waverton	T1 North Shore & Western Line
North Sydney	5.1 km	1932	North Shore	North Sydney	T1 North Shore & Western Line
Milsons Point	4.4 km	1932	North Shore	Milsons Point, Kirribilli	T1 North Shore & Western Line
Wynyard	2.1 km	1932	North Shore	Sydney CBD, Barangaroo	T1 North Shore & Western Line T2 Leppington & Inner West Line T3 Liverpool & Inner West Line T8 Airport & South Line
Town Hall	1.2 km	1932	North Shore	Sydney CBD	T1 North Shore & Western Line T2 Leppington & Inner West Line T3 Liverpool & Inner West Line T4 Eastern Suburbs & Illawarra Line T8 Airport & South Line
Central	0 km	1855	North Shore	Haymarket, Chippendale, Ultimo, Surry Hills	T1 North Shore & Western Line T2 Leppington & Inner West Line T3 Liverpool & Inner West Line T4 Eastern Suburbs & Illawarra Line T8 Airport & South Line M1 Metro North West & Bankstown Line
Redfern	1.3 km	1878	Main Suburban	Redfern, Waterloo, Darlington, Eveleigh	T1 North Shore & Western Line T2 Leppington & Inner West Line T3 Liverpool & Inner West Line T4 Eastern Suburbs & Illawarra Line T8 Airport & South Line
Burwood	10.6 km	1855	Main Suburban	Burwood	T2 Leppington & Inner West Line T3 Liverpool & Inner West Line
Strathfield	11.8 km	1876	Main Suburban	Strathfield, Burwood	T1 North Shore & Western Line T2 Leppington & Inner West Line T3 Liverpool & Inner West Line
North Strathfield	13.4 km	1918	Main North	North Strathfield, Concord West, Concord, Homebush	none
Concord West	14.5 km	1887	Main North	Concord West, Liberty Grove, Concord	none
Rhodes	16.6 km	1886	Main North	Rhodes, Liberty Grove	none
Meadowbank	18.2 km	1887	Main North	Meadowbank, West Ryde, Ryde	none
West Ryde	19.2 km	1886	Main North	West Ryde, Denistone	none
Denistone	20.2 km	1937	Main North	Denistone, Denistone East, Denistone West, West Ryde	none
Eastwood	21.4 km	1886	Main North	Eastwood	none
Epping	23.4 km	1886	Main North	Epping	M1 Metro North West & Bankstown Line
Cheltenham	26.8 km	1898	Main North	Cheltenham	none
Beecroft	28.3 km	1886	Main North	Beecroft	none
Pennant Hills	30 km	1886	Main North	Pennant Hills	none
Thornleigh	30.8 km	1886	Main North	Thornleigh, Pennant Hills, Westleigh	none
Normanhurst	33.1 km	1895	Main North	Normanhurst, Thornleigh, Hornsby	none
Hornsby	35.3 km	1886	Main North	Hornsby, Waitara	T1 North Shore & Western Line

=== Map ===
T9 interactive map

== Rolling stock ==
- New South Wales A and B sets 8-car EMUs
- New South Wales T set 8-car EMUs
- New South Wales H set 8-car EMUs (Weekdays only)
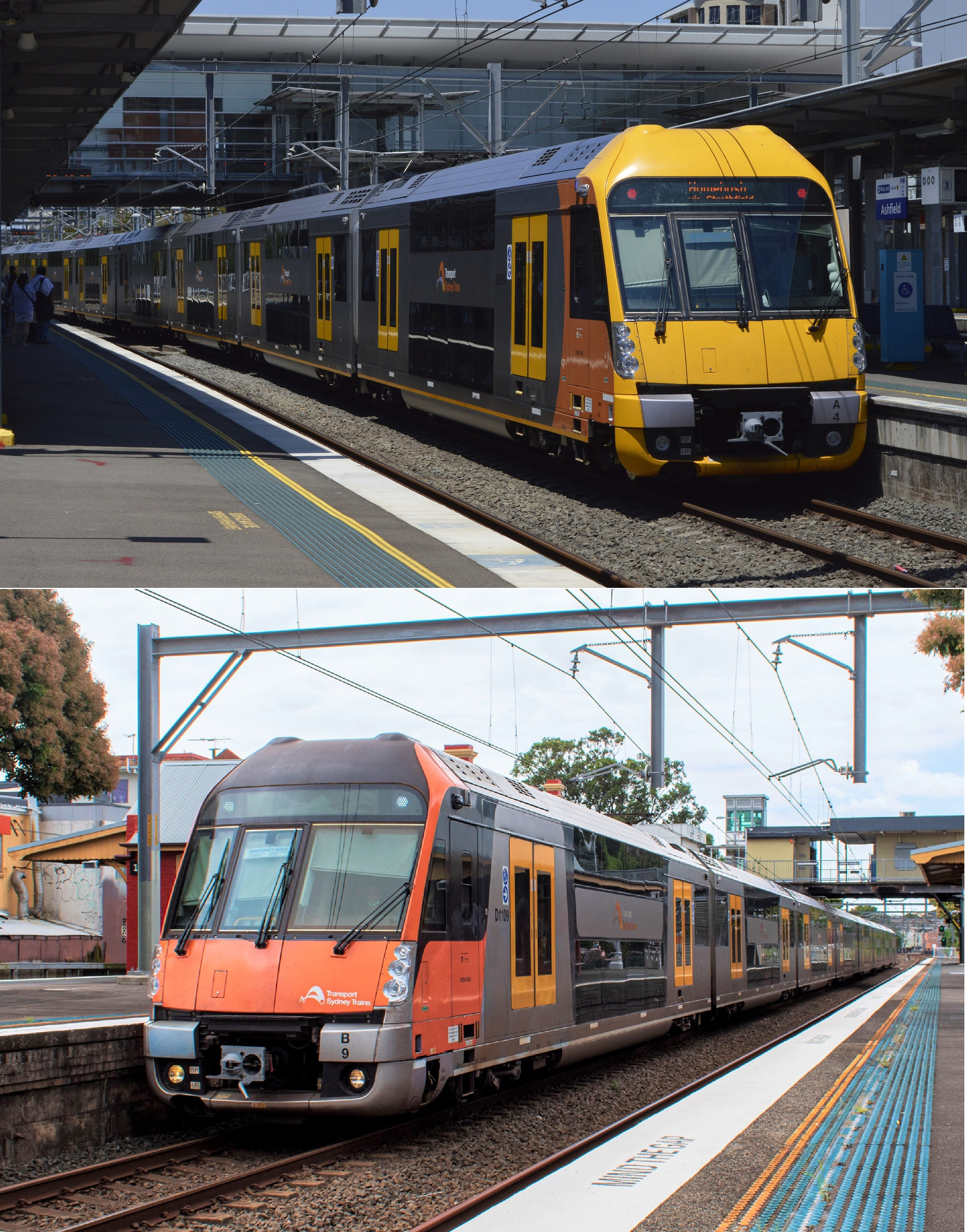
A and B sets

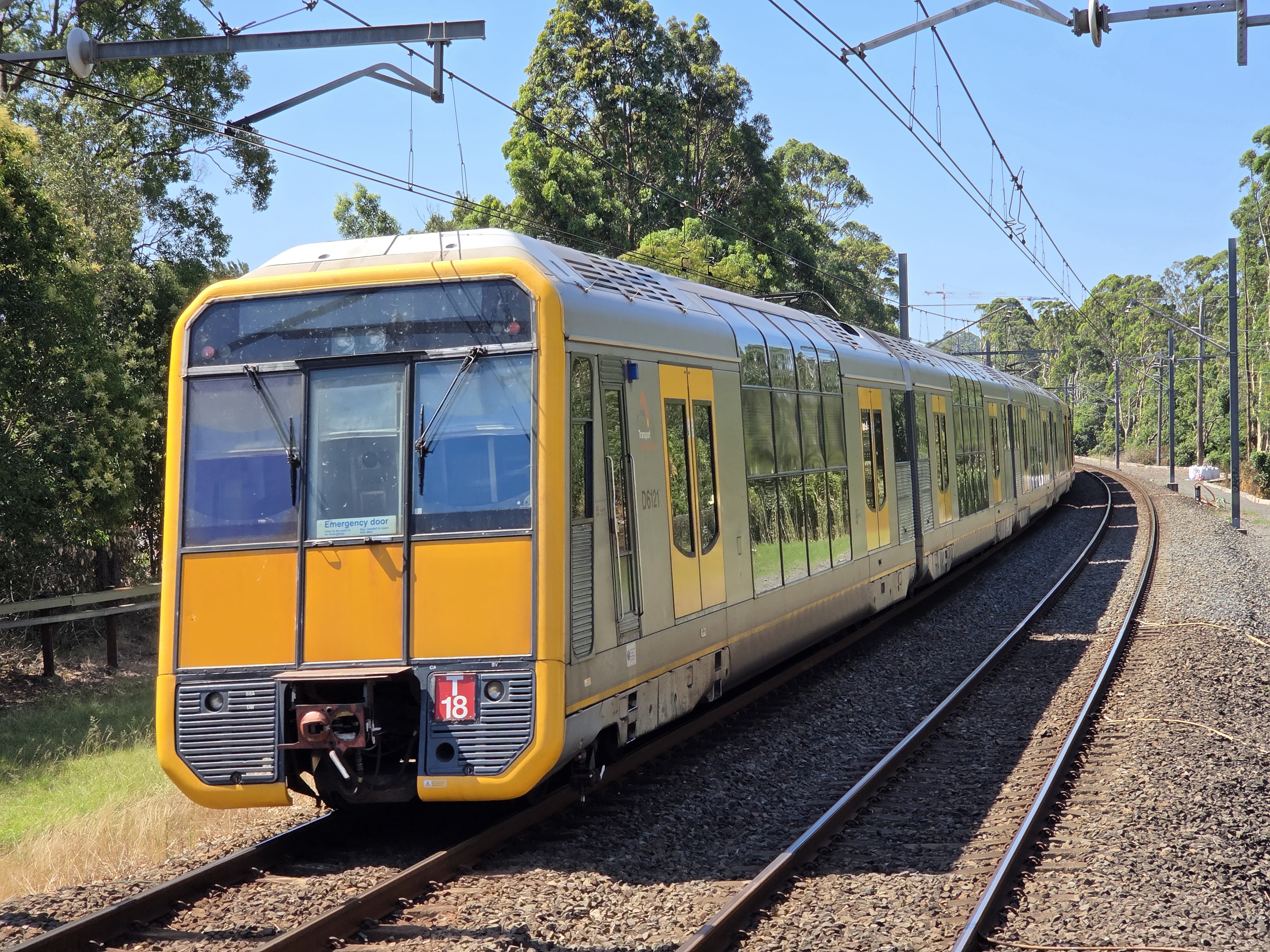
T set

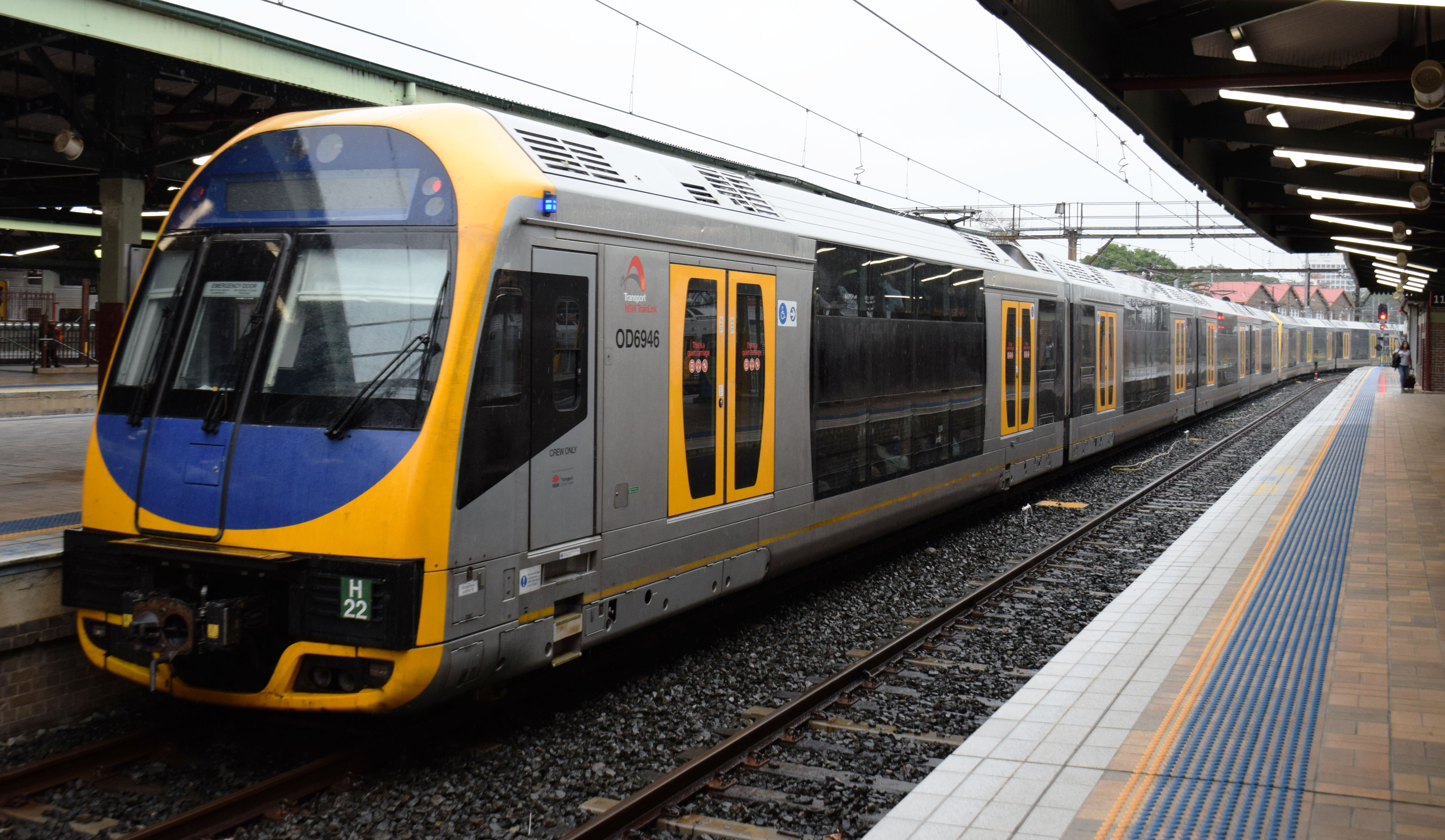
H set

== Patronage ==
The following table shows the patronage for the calendar year 2025.

2025–26 Sydney Trains patronage by line (Note: Figures based on Opal tap on and tap off data)
T1 North Shore & Western Line	79,173,811	
T2 Leppington & Inner West Line	56,339,459	
T3 Liverpool & Inner West Line	11,756,216	(Note: T3 patronage split between former route via Bankstown and current route via Strathfield. The Bankstown route closed 30 September 2024.)
T4 Eastern Suburbs & Illawarra Line	63,990,365	
T5 Cumberland Line	7,629,714	
T6 Lidcombe & Bankstown Line	3,307,374	
Olympic Park railway line	2,400,479	
T8 Airport & South Line	54,235,162	
T9 Northern Line	39,379,659	
