= Epping railway station, Sydney =

Railway station in Sydney, New South Wales, Australia

Epping
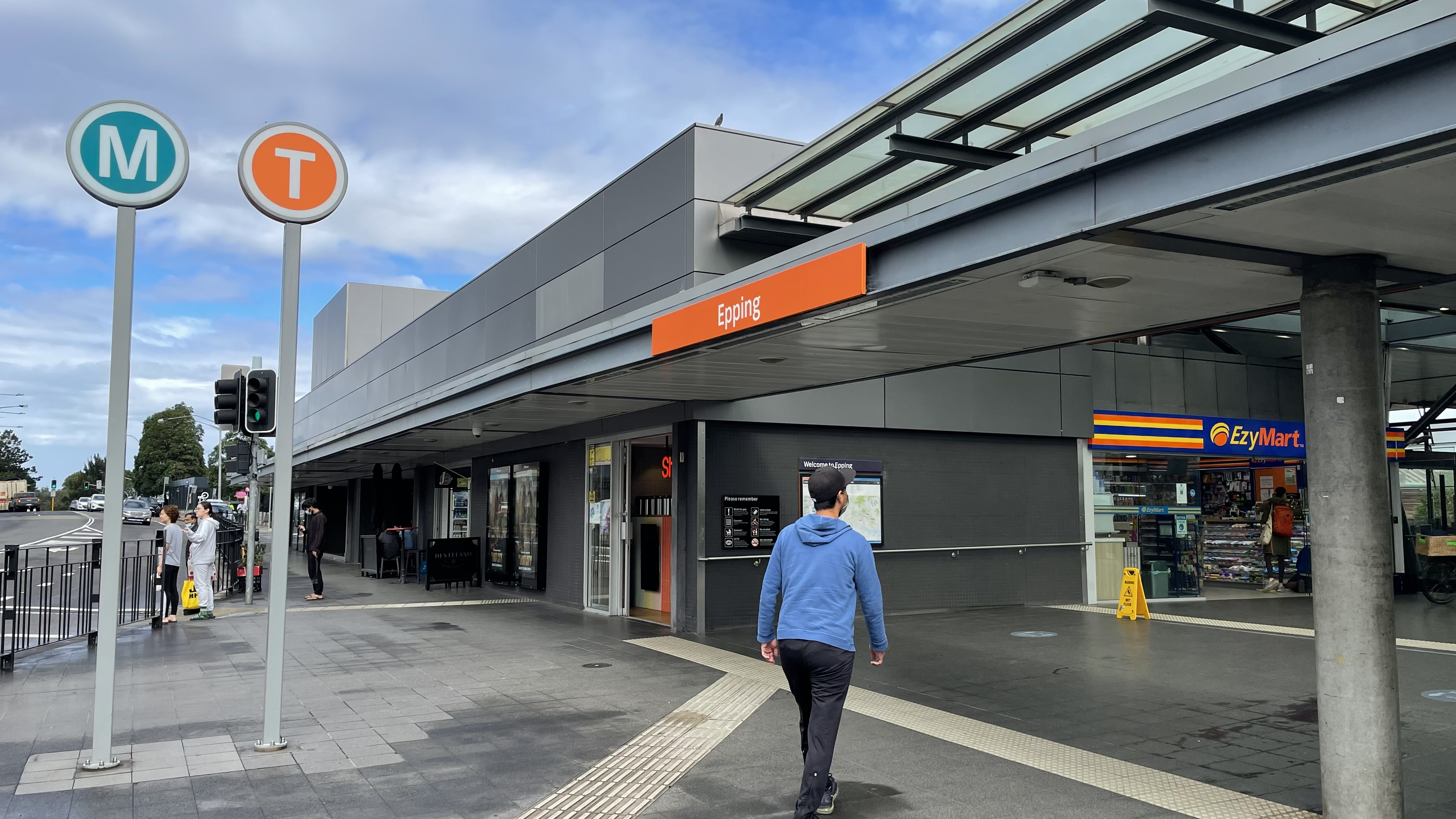
- Langston Place building and entrance in April 2022

General information
- Location: Beecroft Road, Epping, New South Wales, New South Wales; Australia
- Coordinates: 33°46′23″S 151°04′56″E
- Elevation: 97 m (318 ft) (ground level)
- Owner: Transport Asset Manager of NSW
- Operator: Sydney Trains; Metro Trains Sydney
- Lines: Main North; Metro North West & Bankstown
- Distance: 23.32 km (14.49 mi) from Central
- Platforms: 5 (2 island, 1 side)
- Tracks: 5
- Connections: Bus

Construction
- Structure type: Ground; Underground
- Platform levels: 2
- Accessible: Yes

Other information
- Status: Staffed
- Station code: EPG

History
- Opened: 17 September 1886 (140 years ago)
- Rebuilt: 7 October 1899 (127 years ago); 23 February 2009 (17 years ago); 26 May 2019 (7 years ago)
- Electrified: Yes (from 1926)
- Former names: Field of Mars (1886–1887); Carlingford (1887–1899)

Passengers
- 2025: 8,782,560 (year); 24,062 (daily) (Sydney Trains, Sydney Metro)
- Rank: 18

Services
Preceding station	Sydney Trains	Following station
Cheltenham towards Hornsby	T9 Northern Line	Eastwood towards Gordon via Central
Preceding station	Intercity Trains	Following station
Hornsby towards Newcastle Interchange	Central Coast & Newcastle Line	Strathfield towards Central
Preceding station	Sydney Metro	Following station
Cherrybrook towards Tallawong	M1 Metro North West & Bankstown Line	Macquarie University towards Bankstown
Other services
Former services
Preceding station	Sydney Trains	Following station
Macquarie University towards Emu Plains or Richmond	T1 North Shore & Western Line Hornsby via Epping (2009–2018)	Cheltenham towards Hornsby
Location

Epping railway station is a rapid transit and suburban railway station, serving the Sydney suburb of Epping. It is served by Sydney Metro North West & Bankstown Line, Sydney Trains T9 Northern Line and intercity Central Coast & Newcastle Line services.

== History ==
The station opened as Field of Mars on 17 September 1886. It was renamed Carlingford on 5 April 1887, and again to Epping on 7 October 1899 when it moved to its current site.

After much campaigning from locals, a wooden overhead booking office was constructed along with an additional island platform in 1928, The centre track was originally a terminating road, and was served by platforms on each side. This was intended as part of John Bradfield's proposed Epping to St Leonards line. A new booking office on the footbridge was added in 1967 after the 1928 wooden structure was destroyed by fire.

In the mid 1980s, the concourse was extended with more shade provided over platforms as well as the addition of two clock towers.

In 1979, the centre terminating track was converted to a bi-directional main line with the platform face on the eastern side fenced off. As part of the 2000s upgrading works, the fencing was switched to the opposite platform.

The station received lifts in the 1990s in order to make the station wheelchair accessible.

Upgrade works began in 2004 to prepare the station for the Epping to Chatswood rail link. Works included a new concourse and pedestrian overpass, wider platforms, an underground transfer concourse and the addition of two underground platforms (5 & 6) for the new line. The new aerial concourse was constructed to the north of the 1967 concourse, which was demolished. The above ground upgrades were completed on 14 April 2007, while the underground concourse and platforms were opened on 23 February 2009 in conjunction with the new line.

To the north of the station, an additional track was laid up to Thornleigh as part of the Northern Sydney Freight Corridor project, which opened on 14 June 2016.

In September 2018, the Epping to Chatswood rail link (ECRL), the underground concourse and platforms 5 & 6 were closed and upgraded to metro standards, including fitting the underground platforms with platform screen doors, as part of the Sydney Metro Northwest project. As a result, the Northern line reverted to operating from Hornsby to Central via Strathfield, and was later designated its own route T9 in April 2019. On 26 May 2019, the underground concourse and platforms reopened and serviced the new Metro North West Line, operating between Chatswood and Tallawong. The tunnels from the ECRL to the surface was kept, however the track for the Up line was lifted. The track for the down line was kept in case access to the Sydney Metro tunnels was required by maintenance vehicles. However, this access has never been used, with the points clipped and several stop blocks (a piece of wood bolted across the rails) and buffer stops in the way.

=== Signal box ===
Epping signal box opened on 31 October 1928 and operated the interlocking at Epping until its closure on 12 November 2006. The original miniature lever frame was replaced by an NX panel circa 1980. Control of the area was transferred to Strathfield signal box, and then to the new Homebush Control Centre in October 2008. The signal box remained derelict and unused until its demolition in 2010. In 2019, control of the area was passed to the Rail Operations Centre in Alexandria.

== Services ==
=== Platforms ===
Platform	Line	Stopping pattern	Notes
1	Central Coast & Newcastle Line	Southbound services to Sydney Central via Strathfield	
1	T9 Northern Line	Southbound services to Gordon via Strathfield & North Sydney; 8 weekday morning peak and 7 weekday afternoon peak services to Central	
2	T9 Northern Line	Southbound services to Gordon via Strathfield and northbound services to Hornsby	
3	T9 Northern Line	Morning and afternoon peak services to Hornsby	
3	Central Coast & Newcastle Line	services to Gosford, Wyong & Newcastle Interchange	
5	M1 Metro North West & Bankstown Line	Services to Bankstown	
6	M1 Metro North West & Bankstown Line	Services to Tallawong	

=== Transport links ===
Epping station is served by bus routes operated by Busways and CDC NSW, and one NightRide route.

External image
- Epping Bus Guide by Transport for NSW

== Trackplan ==
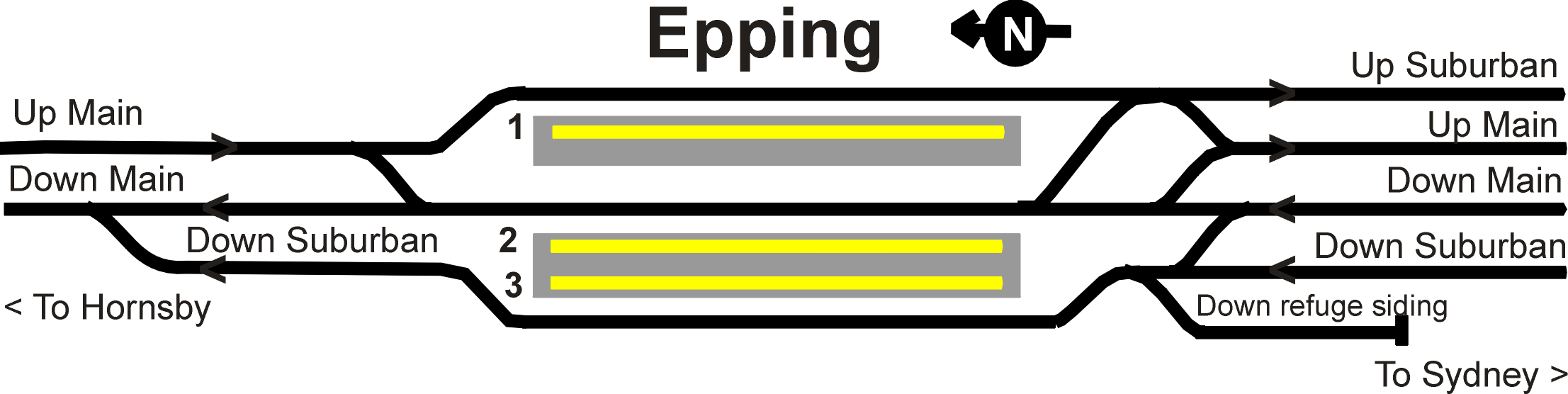
Track layout prior to construction of the Epping to Chatswood line

== Gallery ==
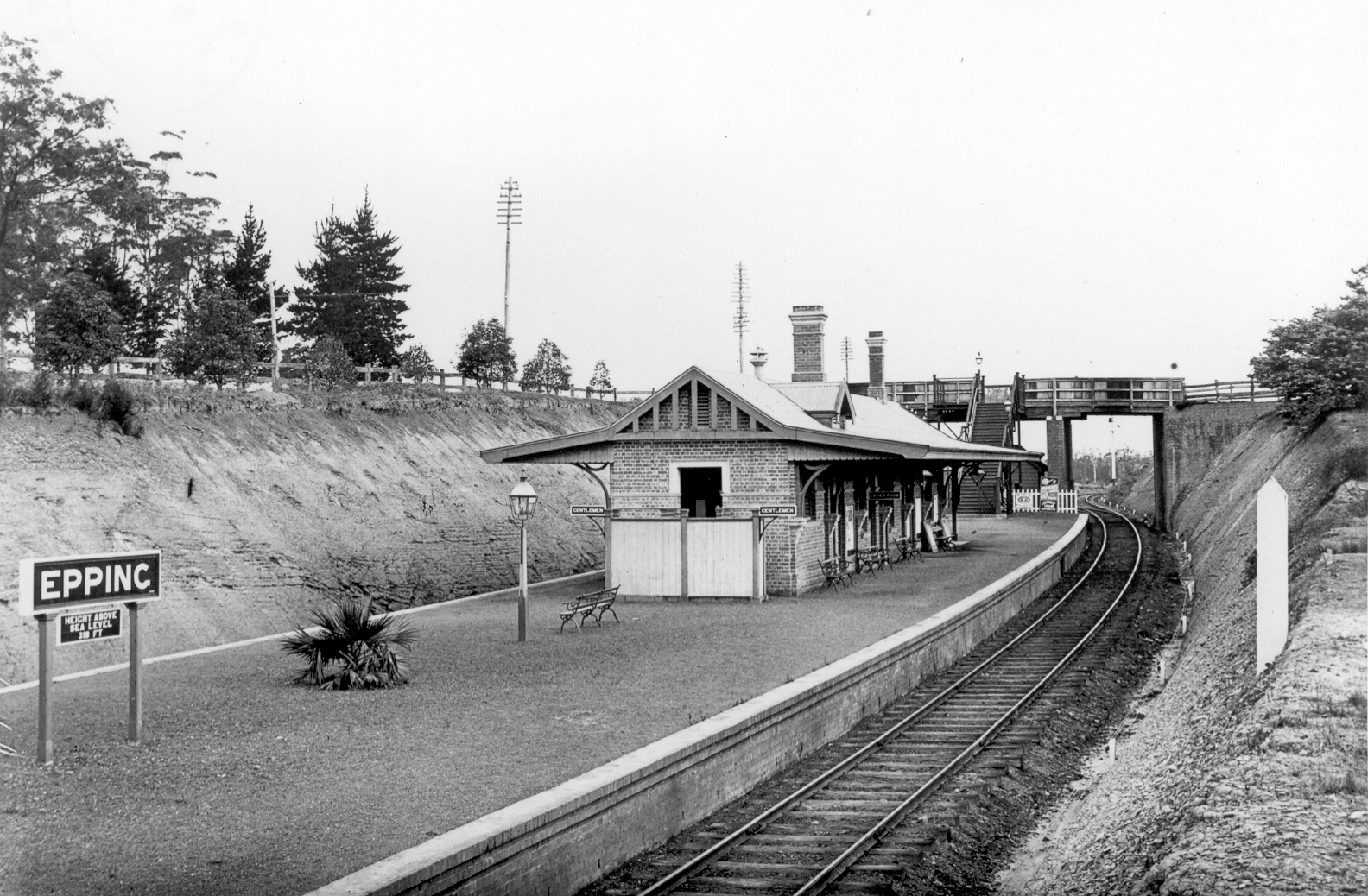
Epping viewing Southbound, c. 1920

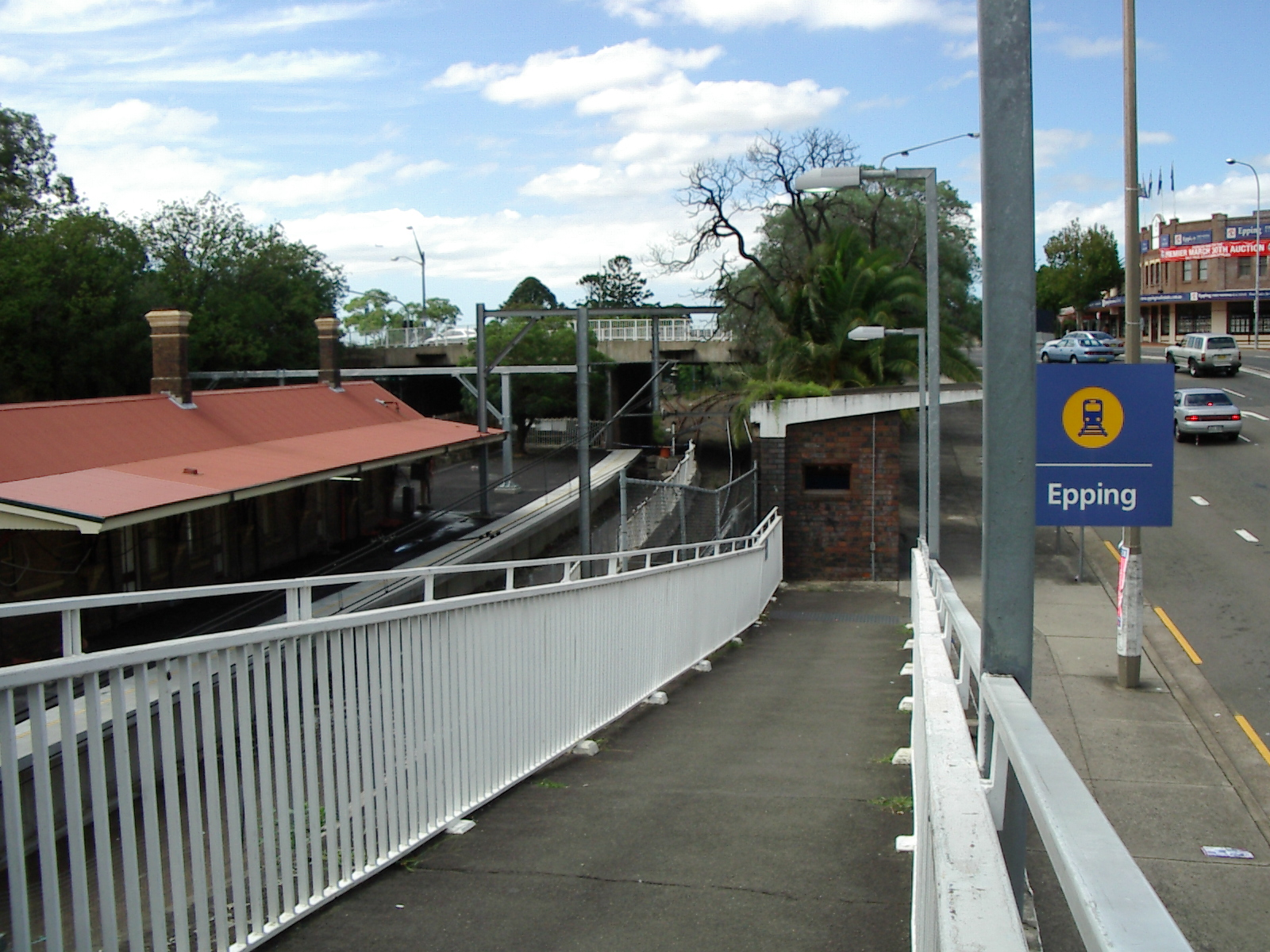
Beecroft Road exit, prior to being rebuilt in February 2006

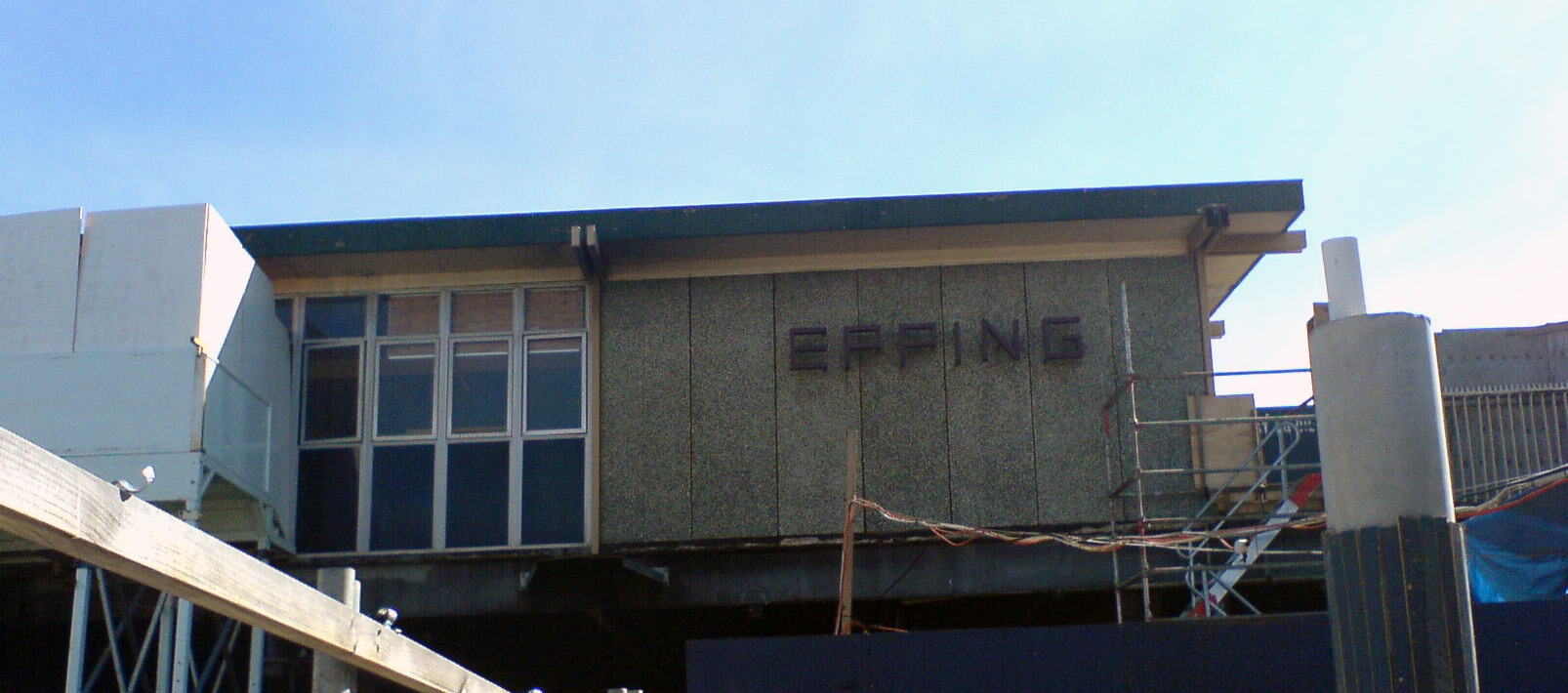
Old concourse prior to its demolition in February 2006

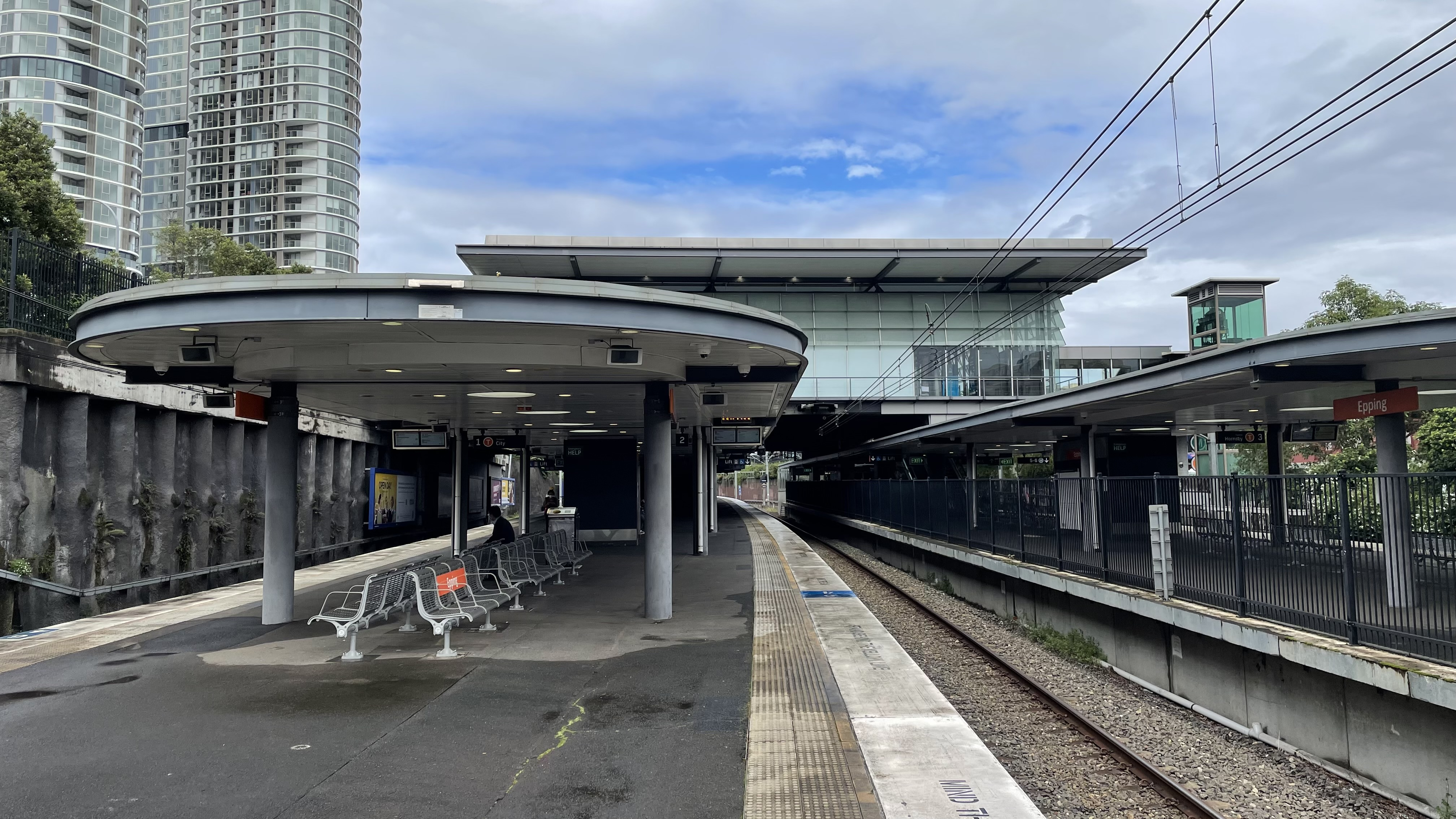
Above ground platforms in April 2022

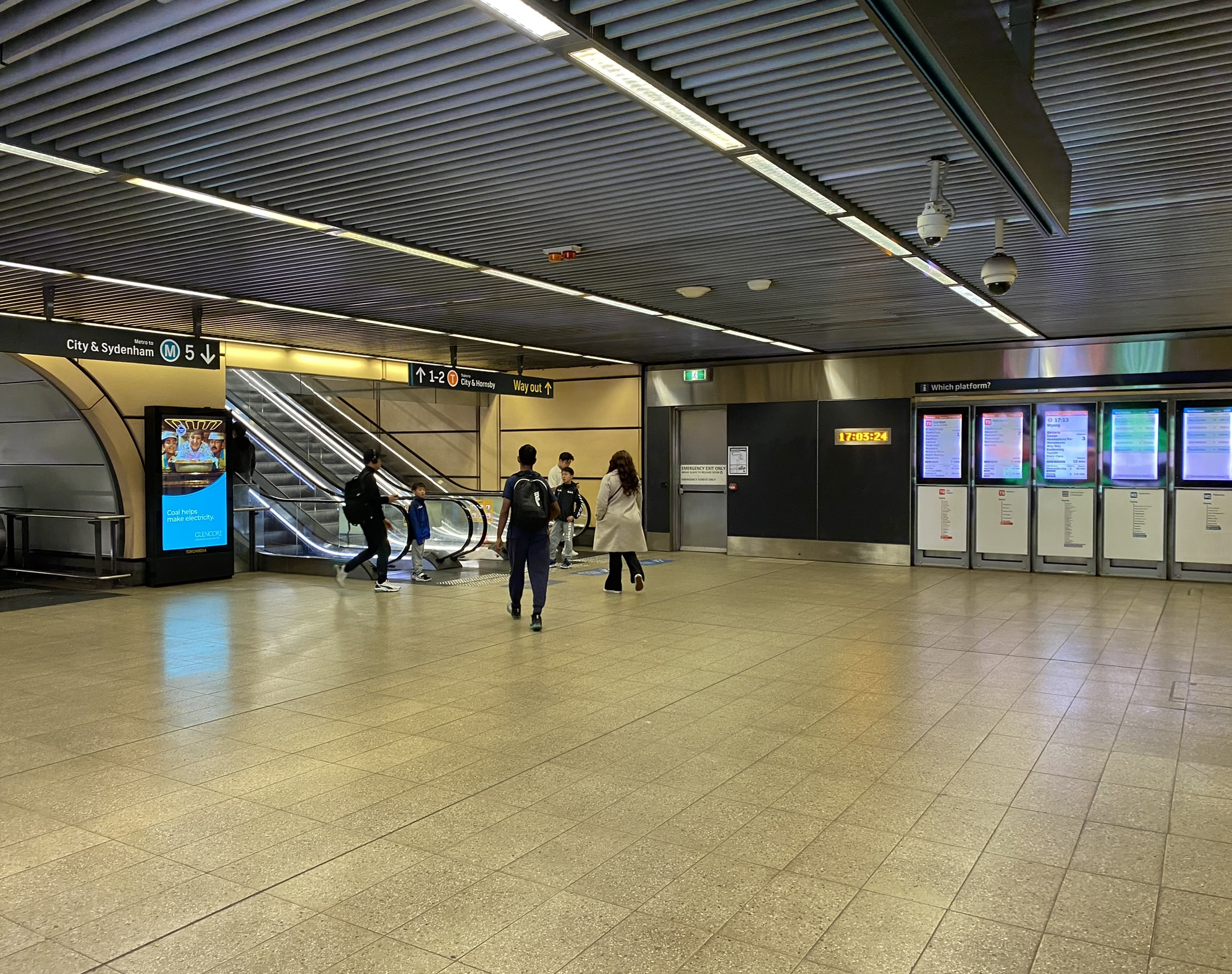
Transfer concourse in August 2024

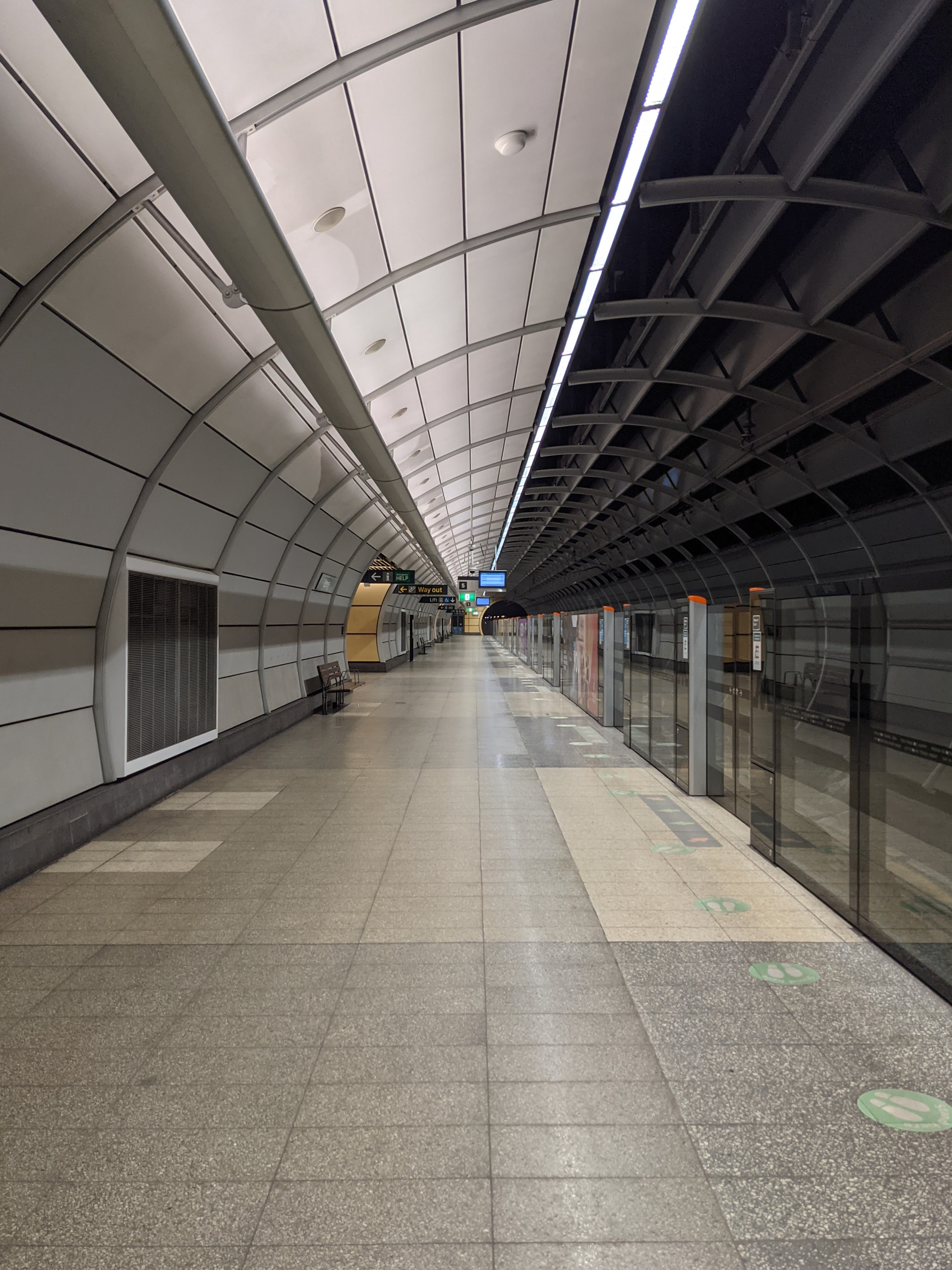
Sydney Metro Northwest platform in August 2021
