= North Sydney railway station =

Railway station in Sydney, Australia

North Sydney
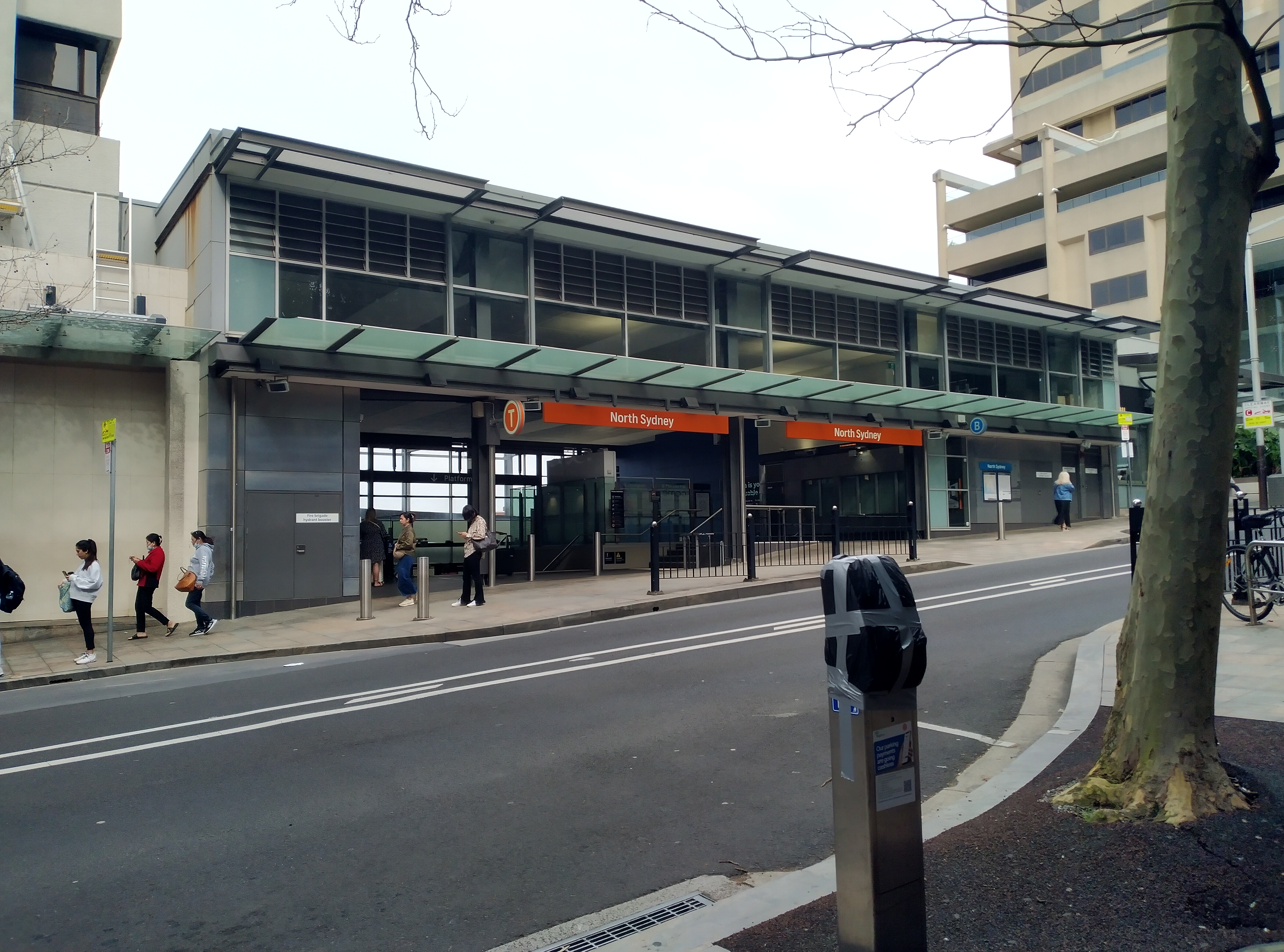
- Station building and Blue Street entrance in August 2024

General information
- Location: Blue Street, North Sydney; New South Wales; Australia
- Coordinates: 33°50′28″S 151°12′26″E
- Elevation: 70 metres (230 ft)
- Owner: New South Wales Government via Transport Asset Manager of New South Wales
- Operator: Sydney Trains
- Line: North Shore
- Distance: 4.8 km (3.0 mi) from Central
- Platforms: 4 (2 island)
- Tracks: 4
- Connections: Bus

Construction
- Structure type: Built over
- Accessible: Yes

Other information
- Status: Staffed
- Station code: NSY
- Website: Transport for NSW

History
- Opened: 20 March 1932 (94 years ago)
- Electrified: Yes; 20 March 1932

Passengers
- 2025: 5,895,443 (year); 16,152 (daily) (Sydney Trains)
- Rank: 27

Services
| Preceding station | Sydney Trains | Following station |
|---|---|---|
| Milsons Point towards Emu Plains or Richmond | North Shore & Western Line | Waverton towards Berowra |
| Milsons Point towards Emu Plains or Richmond | North Shore & Western Line | Terminus |
| Milsons Point via Strathfield towards Hornsby | Northern Line | Waverton towards Gordon |
| Preceding station | Intercity Trains | Following station |
| Milsons Point towards Central | Central Coast & Newcastle Line (peak hour services) | Waverton towards Gosford or Wyong |
Location

North Sydney railway station is a suburban railway station located on the North Shore line, serving the Sydney suburb of North Sydney, the main Business District on Sydney's Lower North Shore. It is served by Sydney Trains T1 North Shore & Western Line and T9 Northern Line services and intercity Central Coast & Newcastle Line services.

== History ==
North Sydney station opened on 20 March 1932 at the same time as the North Shore line over the Sydney Harbour Bridge. Prior to the bridge's opening, North Shore line trains had diverged from the current line at Waverton to the original Milsons Point station at Lavender Bay.

The station was built in a rock cutting with a street level overhead concourse above the platforms. The station has four platforms which correspond with the four railway tracks that were designed to cross the Sydney Harbour Bridge. At the Waverton end of the station there are four tunnels which have been cut into the rock. Unused tunnel stubs of 260 metres for proposed lines to Newport and Northbridge were cut at the same time with Chief Design Engineer John Bradfield calculating that without these, later construction of these lines would interfere with the North Shore line.

From 1932 until 1958, two of the rail tracks designed for the bridge were used by trams, the latter being diverted onto Blue Street just before they would have entered North Sydney Station. After 1958 the tram tracks were removed from the Sydney Harbour Bridge and replaced by the Cahill Expressway.

Beginning in 1968 when the North Sydney Travelodge was built, the air rights over the station have progressively been redeveloped. In December 1972, the awning over platforms 3 and 4 was demolished. The station became totally enclosed with the opening of Zurich Insurance House in 1984.

=== Upgrade ===
Between April 2006 and December 2008, the station was upgraded to handle extra traffic expected with the opening of the Epping to Chatswood line in 2009. The work included an expanded concourse and the installation of escalators and lifts.

== Services ==
=== Platforms ===
The four platforms at North Sydney can have different usages, but the outer platforms are generally the only ones used in off-peak; the middle platforms generally serve terminating trains arriving from the city. Because the four platforms at North Sydney serve a double track railway to the north and south of the station, it has significant capacity for terminating traffic.

The line north through the tunnel from Platform 3 was not laid until 1992 and commissioned in August 1993. The tunnel roads serving platforms 2 and 3 both have a 10 km/h speed limit and are occasionally used by passenger services.

| Platform | Line | Stopping pattern | Notes |
| 1 | North Shore & Western Line | services to Penrith, Emu Plains & Richmond via Central & Strathfield | weekday services to Richmond and 6 CCN services to Blacktown |
| 1 | Northern Line (Sydney) | services to Epping & Hornsby via Central & Strathfield | |
| 1 | Central Coast & Newcastle Line | 6 Weekday morning peak hour services to Sydney Central | |
| 2 | North Shore & Western Line | terminating services, returning to Richmond and Penrith | |
| 3 | North Shore & Western Line | peak hour services and weekend terminating services, returning to Penrith | Occasionally used by terminating T4 line services during service disruptions between Central and Bondi Junction |
| 4 | North Shore & Western Line | services to Lindfield, Gordon, Hornsby & Berowra | 6 Evening peak Intercity train services to Wyong |
| 4 | Northern Line (Sydney) | services to Gordon | |
| 4 | Central Coast & Newcastle Line | 6 Weekday Evening peak Intercity train services to Gosford & Wyong via Gordon | |

=== Transport links ===
CDC NSW operates two bus routes via North Sydney Station, under contract to Transport for NSW:

- 612X: to Baulkham Hills via St Leonards, Epping Rd, Gore Hill Technology Park and M2
- 622: to Cherrybrook via St Leonards, Lane Cove, North Ryde, M2, West Pennant Hills

External image
- North Sydney station Public Transport Map by Transport for NSW

== Gallery ==
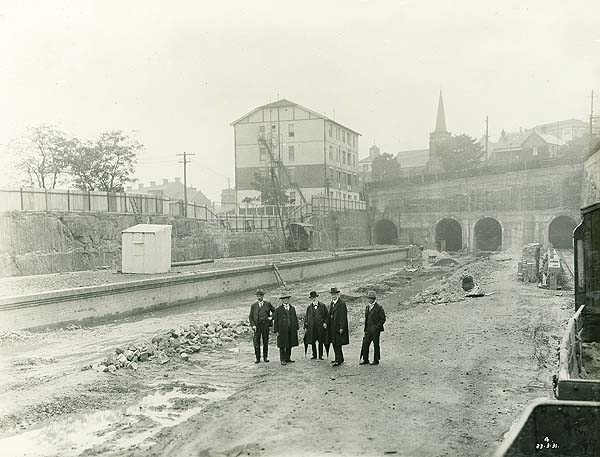
View of the entrances to the tunnels at the Waverton end of the station, photographed in 1931

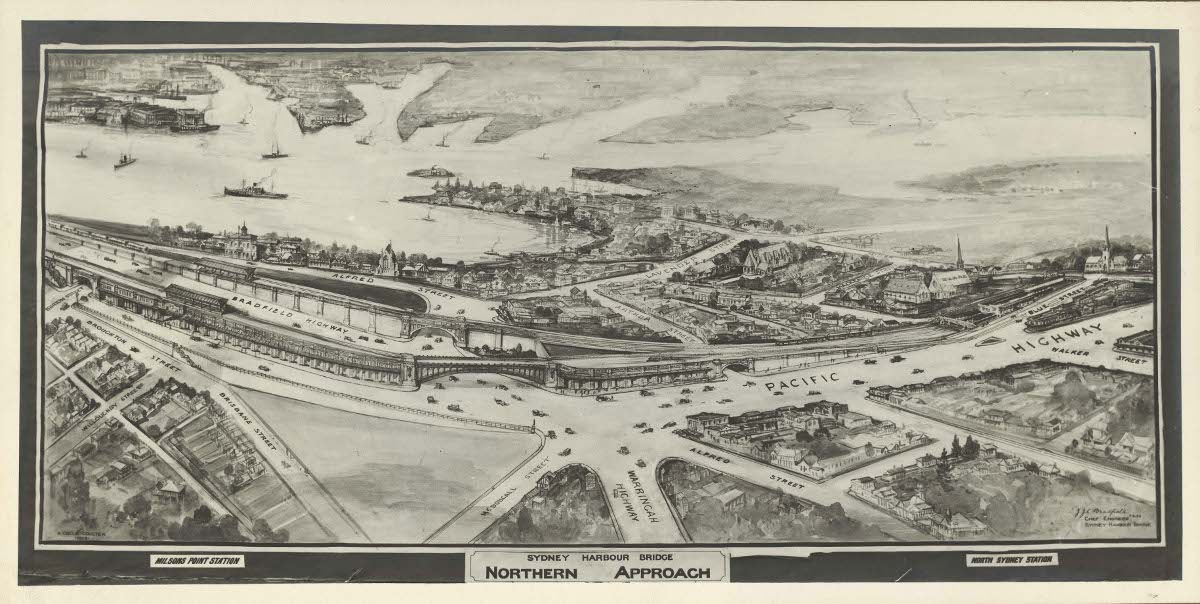
The two pairs of platforms on either side of the roadway at Milsons Point were intended to join up at North Sydney

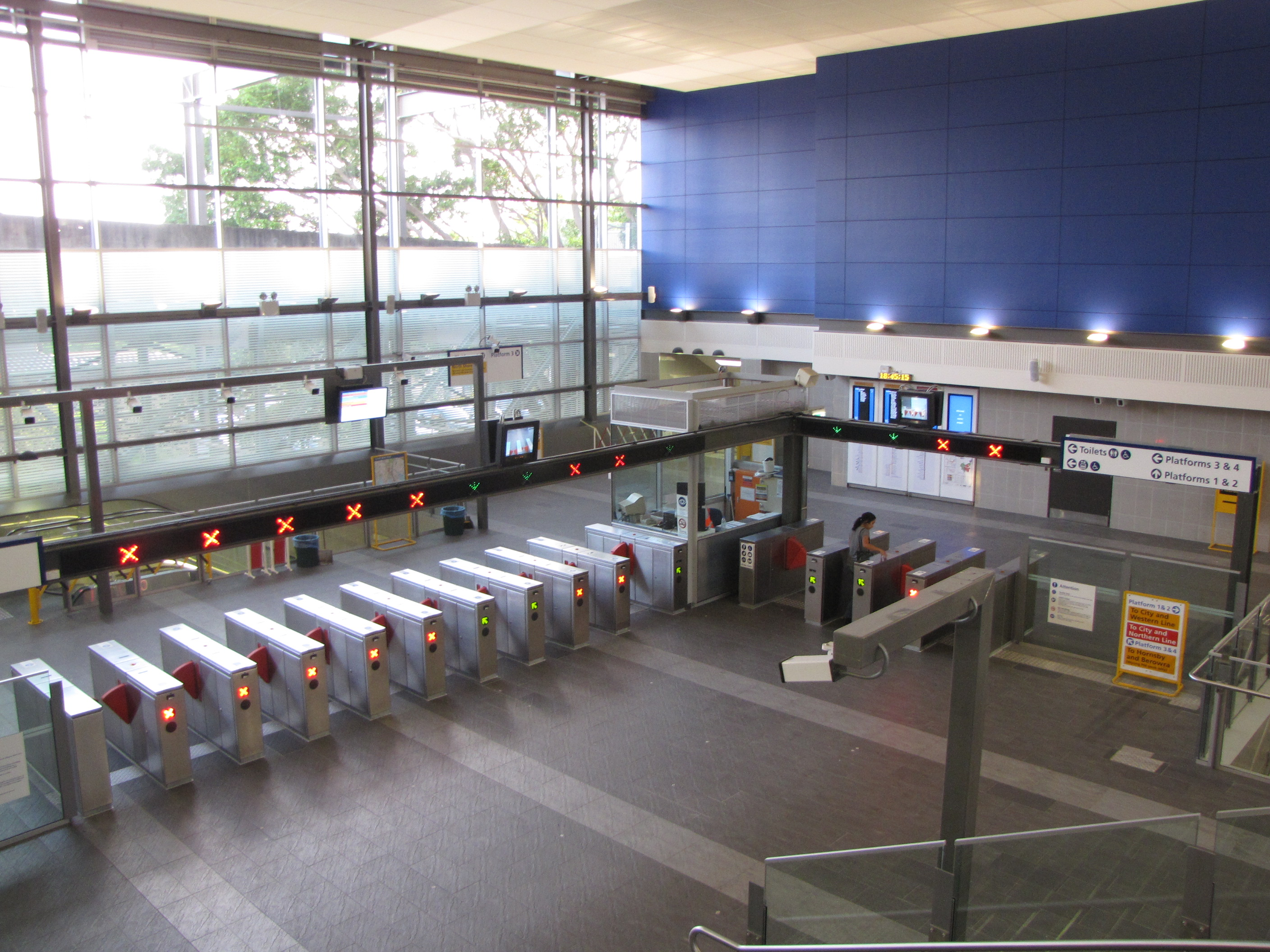
Concourse

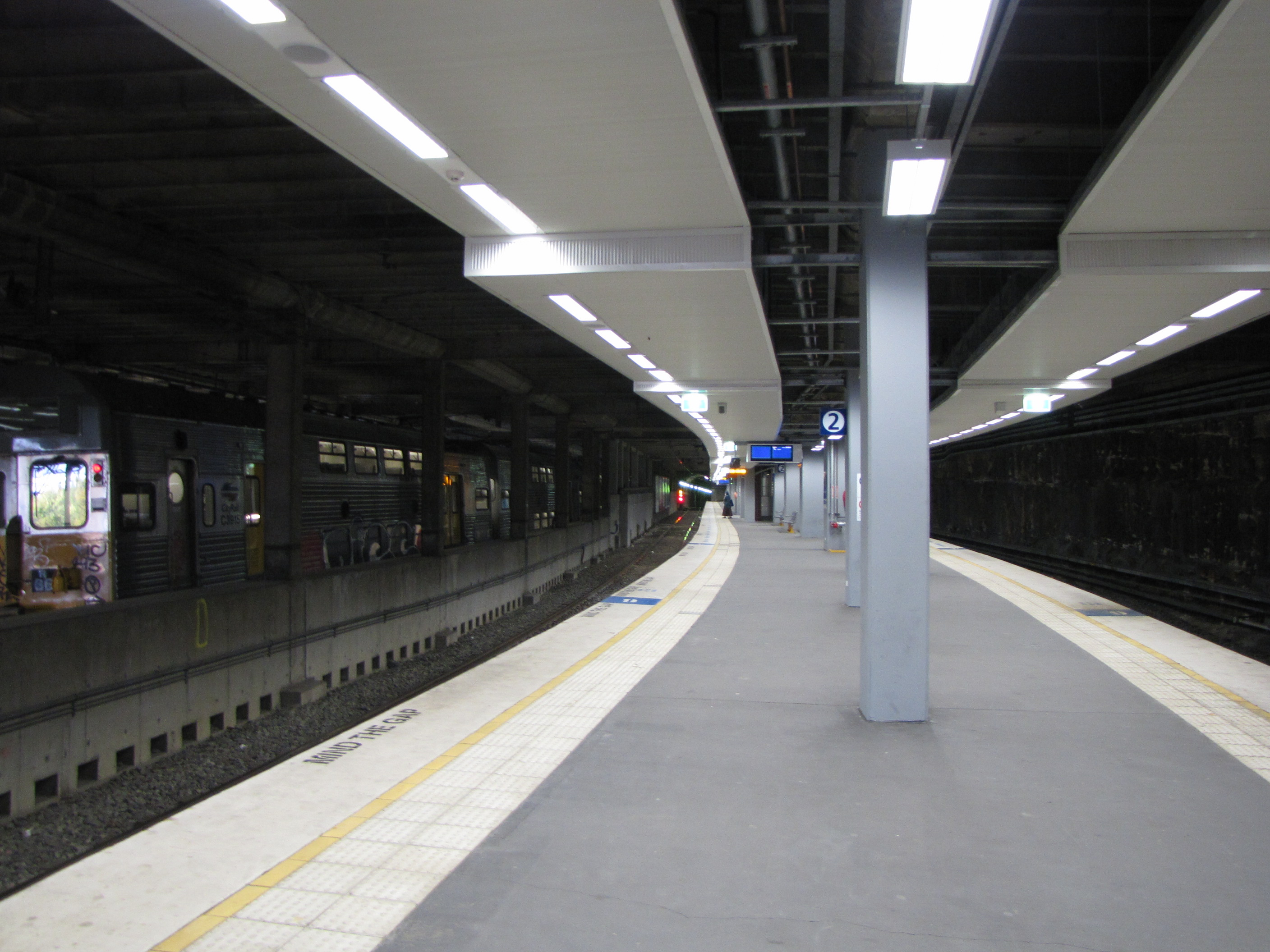
Platforms 1 & 2
