= Parkline Place =

Skyscraper in Sydney, Australia

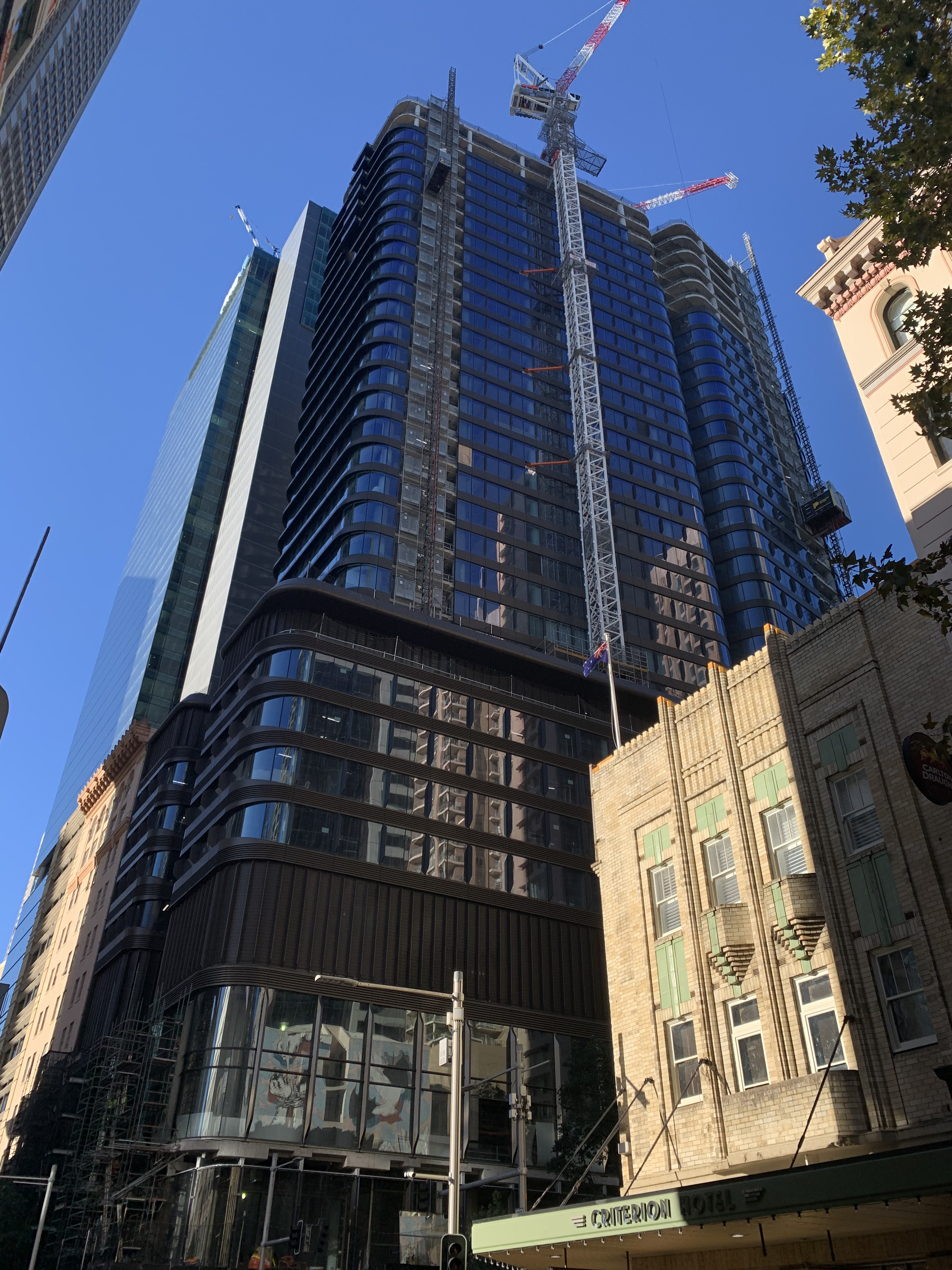
- Interactive map of the Parkline Place area

General information
- Status: Completed
- Type: Commercial
- Location: Sydney CBD, 252 Pitt Street, Sydney, Australia
- Coordinates: 33.872889°S 151.208695°E
- Current tenants: BDO Australia; Insignia Financial; Foster + Partners; Servcorp; Crown Solicitors Office; Department of Climate Change, Energy, the Environment and Water (DCCEEW); Department of Planning, Housing and Infrastructure; NSW Office of the Director of Public Prosecutions (ODPP)
- Construction started: 2021
- Completed: 2024
- Cost: A$369 million
- Owner: Oxford Properties Group; Mitsubishi Estate Asia
- Operator: Investa Property Group

Height
- Height: 155 metres (509 ft)

Technical details
- Floor count: 39
- Floor area: 47,839 square metres (514,930 sq ft)

Design and construction
- Architecture firm: Foster + Partners with COX Architecture
- Structural engineer: Aurecon
- Other designers: Sue Barnsley Design
- Main contractor: CPB Contractors
- Awards: Winner, 2026 Council for Vertical Urbanism (CVU) Award of Excellence – Best Tall Building by Height, 100–199m; Façade Award; and Best Tall Building by Region, Oceania. Winner, The Urban Developer Awards for Excellence 2026 – Design Innovation and Commercial Development of the Year Winner, Urban Taskforce Development Excellence Awards – Commercial Development of the Year

Other information
- Public transit: Gadigal

Website
- www.parklineplace.com.au

Parkline Place is a skyscraper in Sydney built as one of the two buildings that form a part of Sydney Metro's 'integrated station and precinct development' (ISD) plan for Gadigal railway station. The design by Foster + Partners, for a 39-storey office building and retail plaza, was inspired by the Bloomberg Building in London and Hearst Tower (Manhattan) in New York and stands at a height of 155 metres (509 ft).

== History ==
On 11 September 2019 the NSW government awarded the contract for the Sydney Metro Pitt Street Metro Station 'over station development' (OSD) project to a consortium of Oxford Properties Group, CPB Contractors and Grocon.

On 4 March 2021 the consortium obtained approval from the NSW Government for development application 'SSD 10375 Pitt Street North Over Station Development Stage 2'. Construction works of the building, designed by architecture firm Foster + Partners with COX Architecture, started in 2021 and reached practical completion in 2024, in line with the new Sydney Metro City metro line opening.

In April 2023 BDO Australia announced levels 22 to 25 as their new offices.

In January 2024 it was announced that Insignia Financial secured signage rights to the building and leased levels 16 to 21.

In October 2024 it was reported that construction was delayed due to industrial action putting the project 3 months behind schedule.

In January 2025, the NSW Government announced Parkline Place as the new workplace hub for four agencies. The lease arrangements included a 12-year lease for the Office of the Director of Public Prosecutions (ODPP), a 12-year lease for the Department of Planning, Housing and Infrastructure (DPHI) and the Department of Climate Change, Energy, the Environment and Water (DCCEEW) for flexible touchdown space across three floors, and a 13-and-a-half-year lease for the Crown Solicitor’s Office (CSO).

== Construction ==
CPB Contractors was confirmed as the builder of the commercial building as well as the builder for the wider construction project that included Gadigal metro station and Indi Sydney, the build to rent residence for the new Gadigal railway station along the new Sydney Metro City & Southwest Line that sits beneath the building, and the accompanying build-to-rent residential tower.

== Awards ==
The building has won a series of awards since completion in 2024.

- 2026 - Winner, Urban Taskforce Development Excellence Awards - Commercial Development
- 2026 - Winner, The Urban Developer Awards for Excellence - Commercial Development of the Year, Design Innovation
- 2026 - Shortlist, Australian Institute of Architects’ NSW Architecture Awards - Commercial Architecture

== Gallery ==
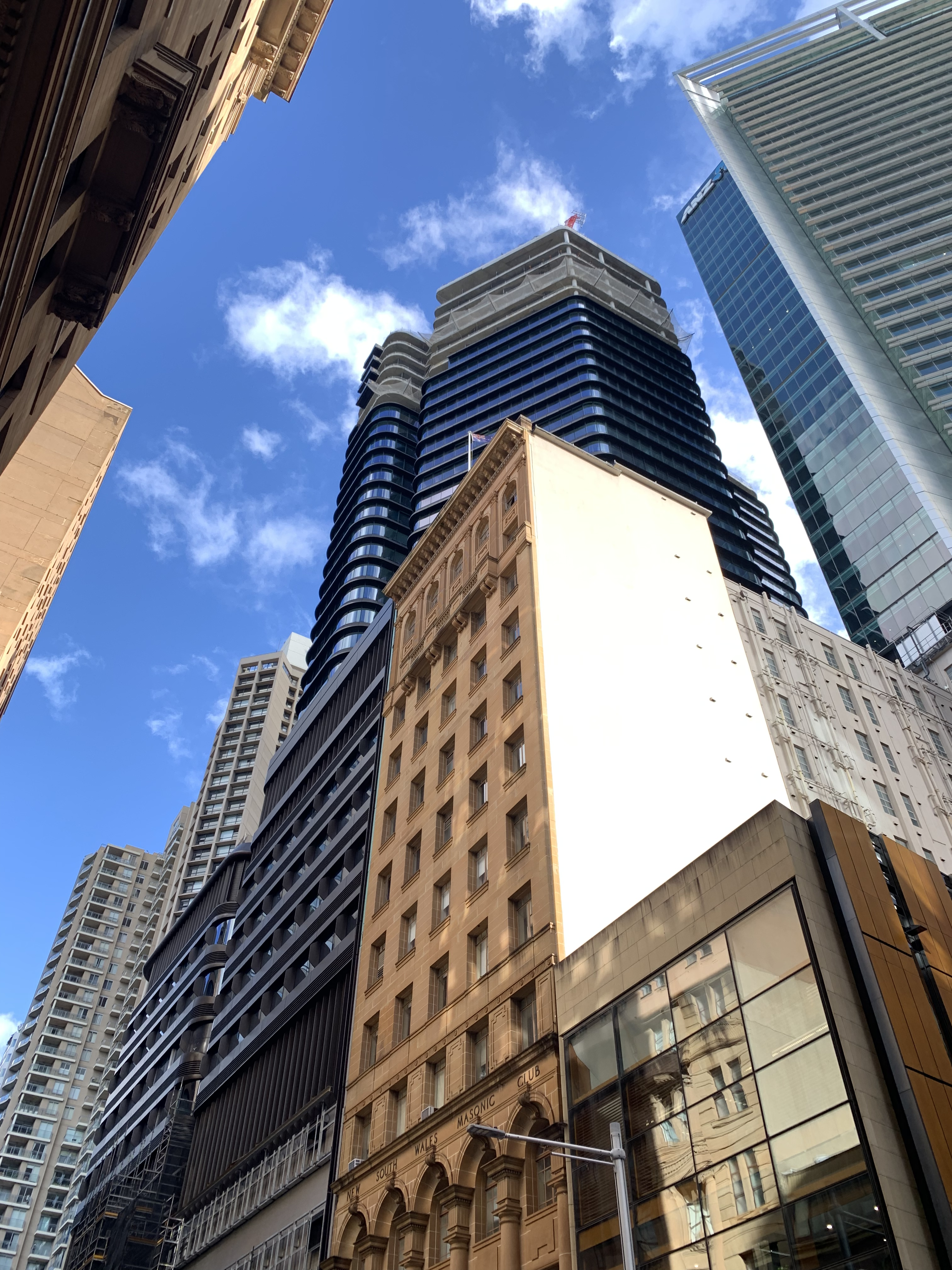

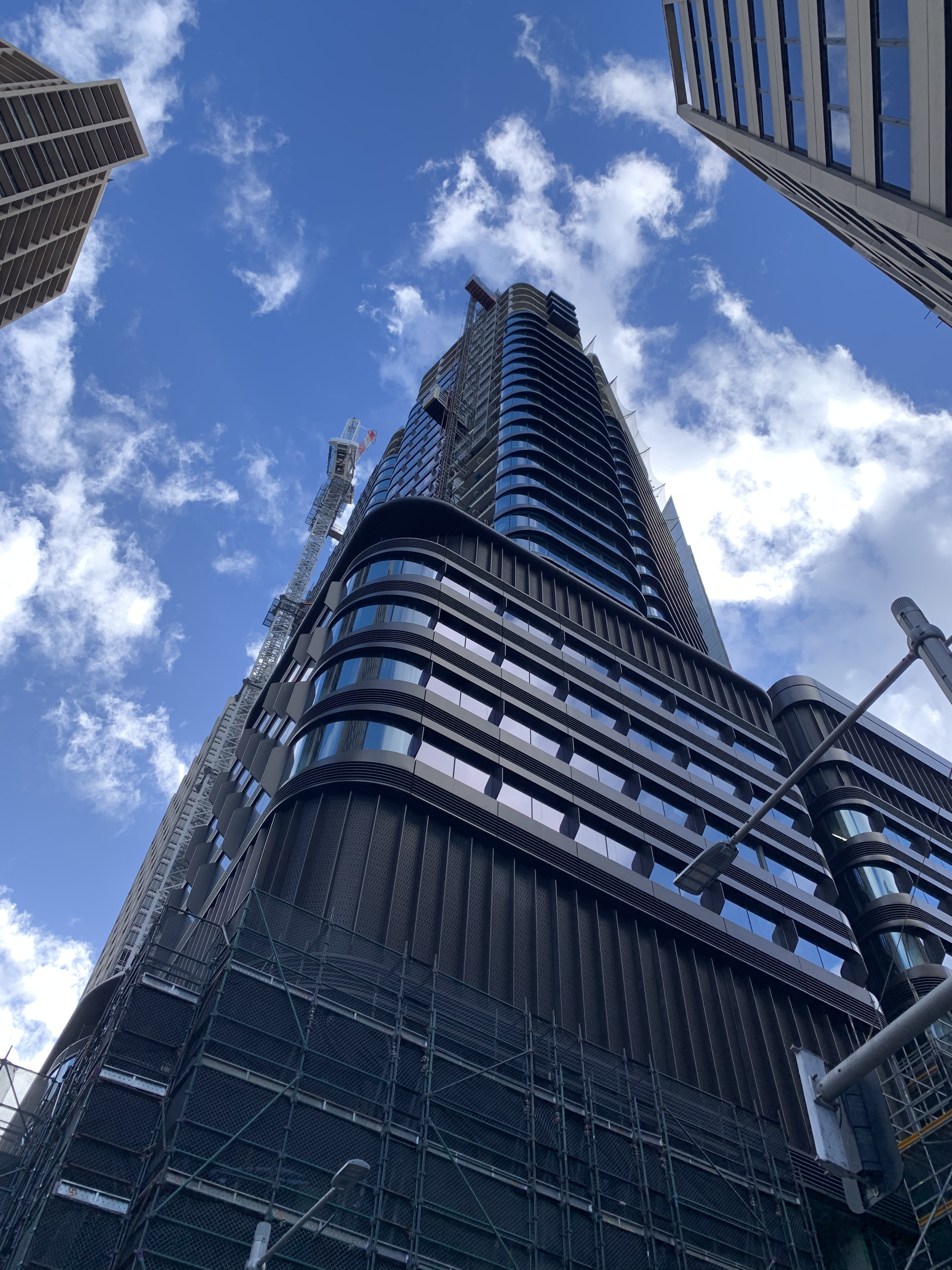

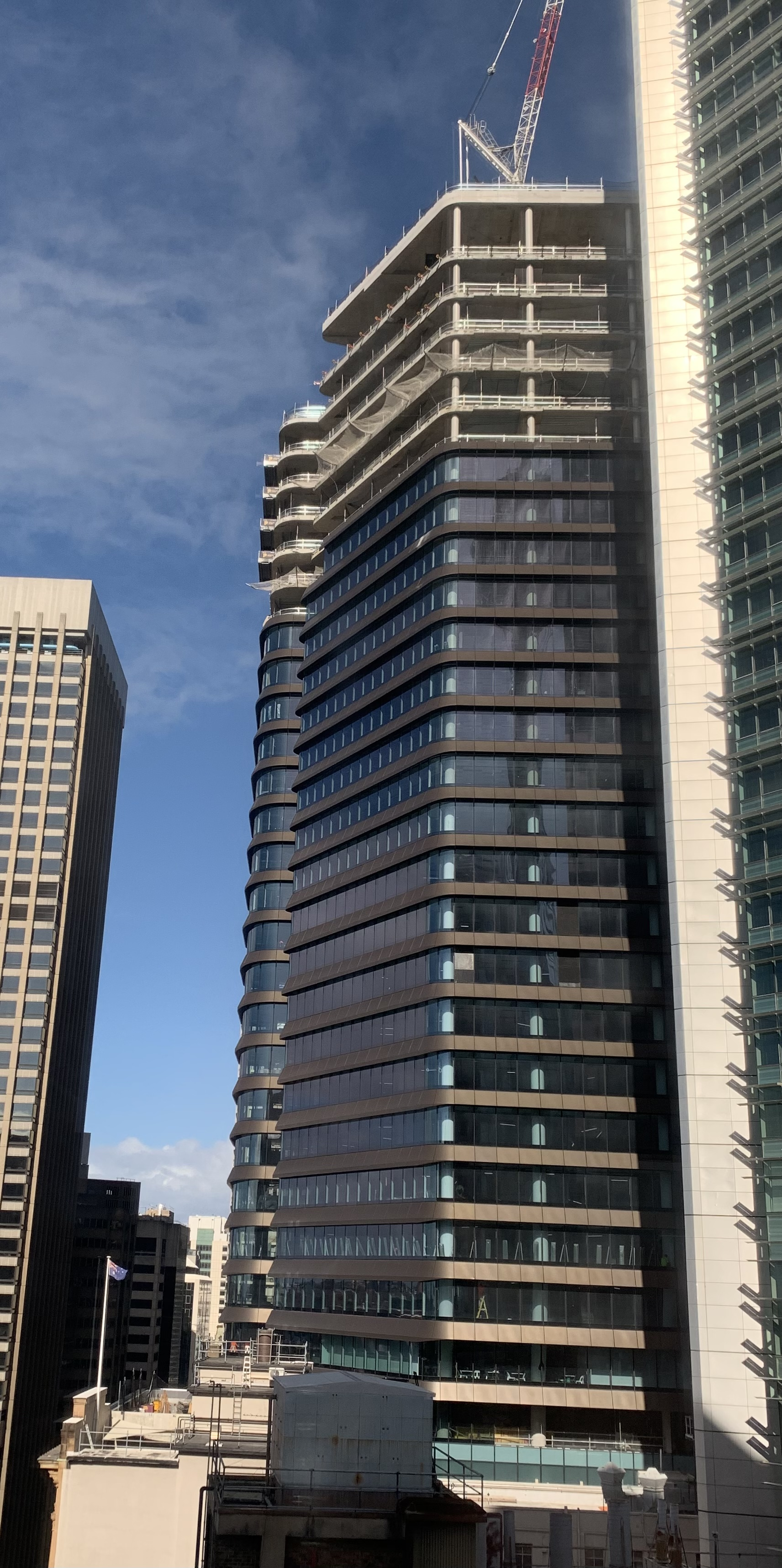
