= Sydney Metro City & Southwest =

Rapid transit project in Sydney, New South Wales, Australia

- Map of the Sydney Metro M1's construction segments

Overview
- Status: Complete
- Owner: Transport for NSW
- Line number: M1
- Locale: Sydney, New South Wales, Australia
- Termini: Chatswood; Bankstown
- Stations: 18 (7 new stations, 11 stations converted)

Service
- Type: Rapid transit
- System: Sydney Metro
- Rolling stock: Metropolis Stock

History
- Opened: 19 August 2024 (Chatswood to Sydenham); 30 October 2026 (Sydenham to Bankstown)
- Announced: 2013
- Start of major construction: 2017

Technical
- Line length: 30 km (19 mi)
- Num of tracks: 2
- Track gauge: 1,435 mm (4 ft 8 1/2 in) standard gauge
- Electrification: 1,500 V DC from overhead catenary
- Signalling: Alstom Urbalis 400 moving block CBTC ATC under ATO GoA 4 (UTO), with subsystems of ATP, ATS and Smartlock CBI
Route map
All Metro stations
have wheelchair access

Sydney Metro City & Southwest was a 30-kilometre (19 mi) rapid transit construction project in Sydney, New South Wales, Australia. The project extended the M1 Metro North West & Bankstown Line from Chatswood on the North Shore, to Bankstown in the city's southwest via the Sydney central business district. The line is part of the Sydney Metro system.

The project was constructed in two stages. The first stage constructed a new 16-kilometre (9.9 mi) twin-tunnel rail crossing under Sydney Harbour and through the city to Sydenham with seven new underground stations in central Sydney. The second stage converted a portion of the Bankstown line on the Sydney Trains network for use by autonomous trains, including the reconstruction of 11 stations. The first stage between Chatswood and Sydenham, opened on 19 August 2024, and the second stage between Sydenham and Bankstown opened on 30 October 2026.

With the completion of the project, the constructed track forms part of a single 66-km rail line on the Sydney Metro network. Together with planned improvements to the Main Western line, the project is expected to increase capacity on the Sydney rail network by up to 60%, and allow for the movement of over 100,000 extra commuters across the network every hour.

The project began construction in 2017. In 2023, the state government confirmed the cost of the project had overrun initial estimates by $9 billion to a total cost of $20.5 billion, due to budget blowouts and station redesigns. On 30 October 2026, the project concluded with the opening of the final section of the Southwest extension.

== Project history ==
In 2013, a proposal was raised to extend the then-proposed North West Rail Link, by building a metro-style tunnel from just south of Chatswood Station via St Leonards and North Sydney and under the Sydney Harbour towards Central and Redfern, before joining the newly converted metro lines towards Hurstville, Bankstown, Lidcombe and Liverpool. This largely renews a previous proposal known as the CBD Rail Link (see below), except with metro-style trains instead. The Hurstville extension was subsequently dropped.

The proposal was officially announced by the New South Wales government on 10 June 2014. The proposal was contingent on funding from privatising at least 49% of the state's power infrastructure, which was secured in June 2015. Preliminary works involving drilling to depths 70 m (230 ft) below Sydney Harbour commenced on 9 April 2015 to find the alignment for the new Sydney Metro tunnels.

=== Chatswood to Sydenham section ===
Planning approval for the Chatswood to Sydenham section of the project was received in January 2017. In June 2017, a John Holland, CPB Contractors and Ghella joint venture was awarded the contract to build the twin tunnels from Chatswood to Sydenham. Construction began later that year.

A contract for a major upgrade of Central station was awarded to Laing O'Rourke in March 2018. The project includes construction of two new underground platforms to serve the metro and a new underground concourse called Central Walk. The new platforms will be built beneath platforms 13–14.

Tunnelling commenced in October 2018. Tunnelling was completed in March 2020.

In November 2018, a $1.376 billion contract was awarded to an unincorporated joint venture between CPB Contractors and UGL to be known as Systems Connect, which will include the laying of track from Chatswood to Sydenham as well as converting power on the Bankstown line to Metro standards and also the building of further Metro train facilities at Rouse Hill and Marrickville.

In mid-2024, it was announced that the Chatswood to Sydenham section would open on 4 August 2024, However, this was postponed to 19 August 2024.

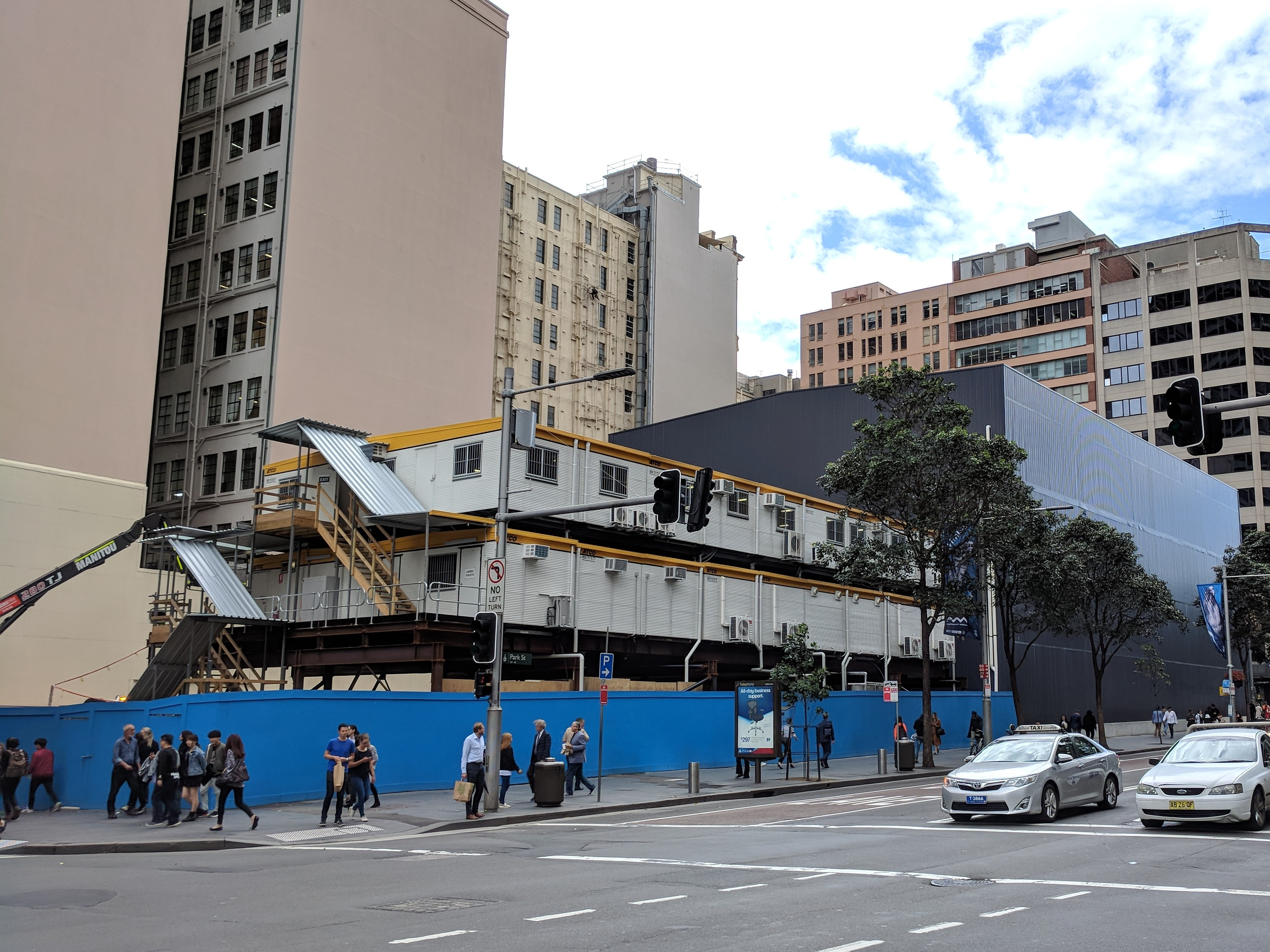
Gadigal railway station under construction in October 2018

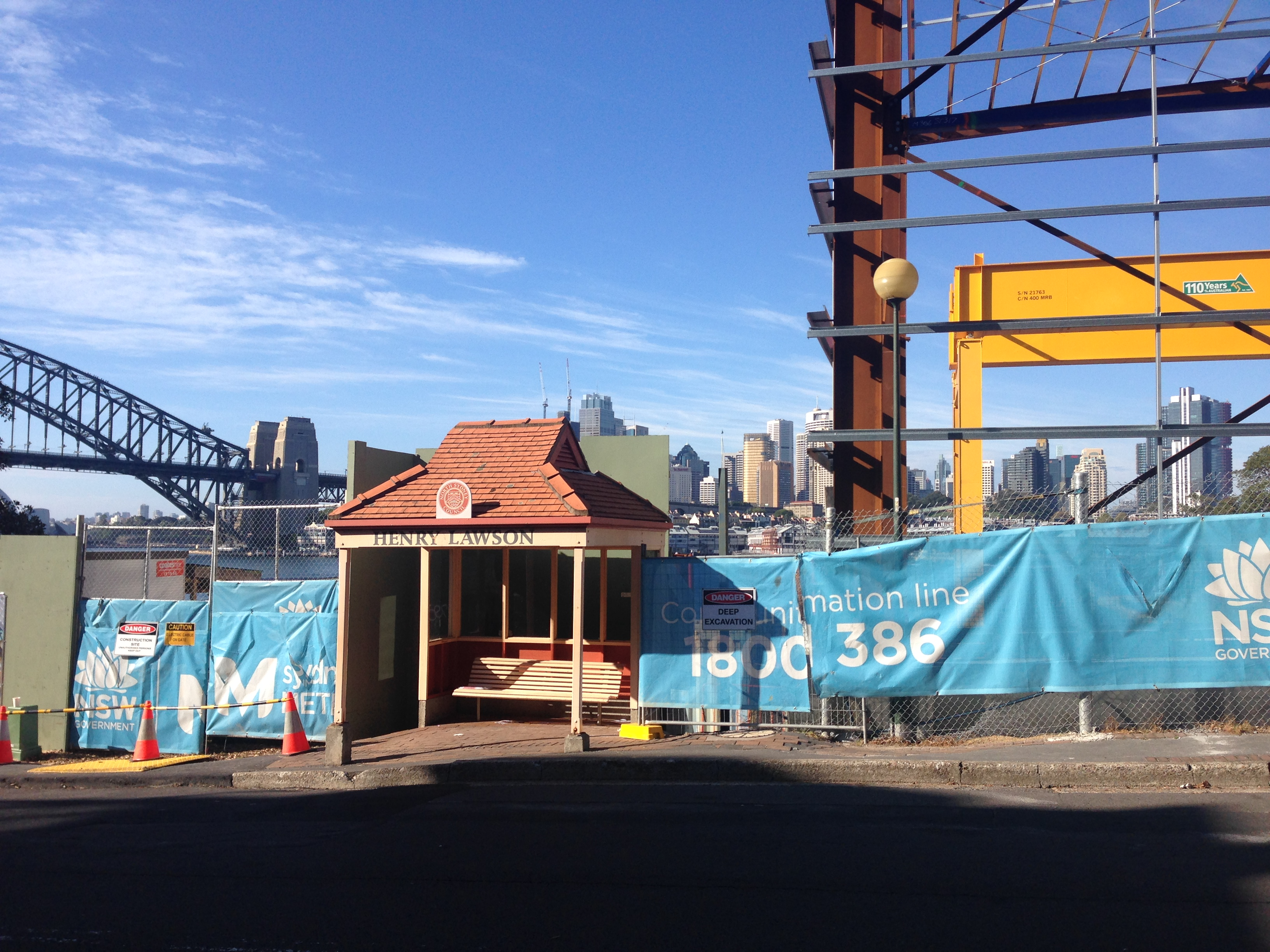
Construction at the Blues Point dive site, April 2019

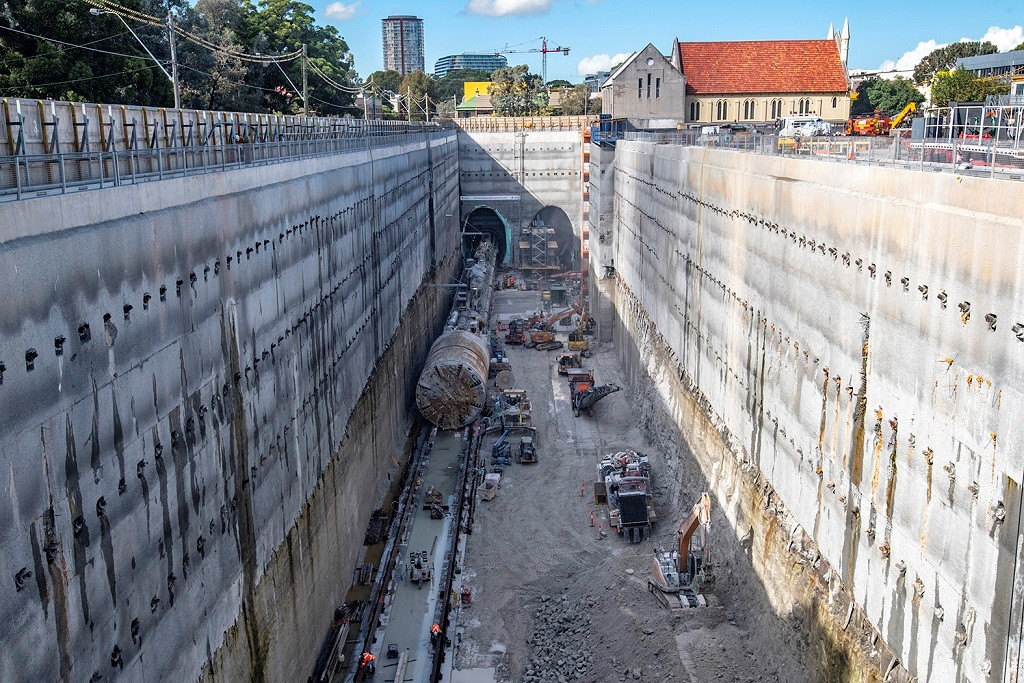
Tunnel boring at the Waterloo station dive site, May 2019

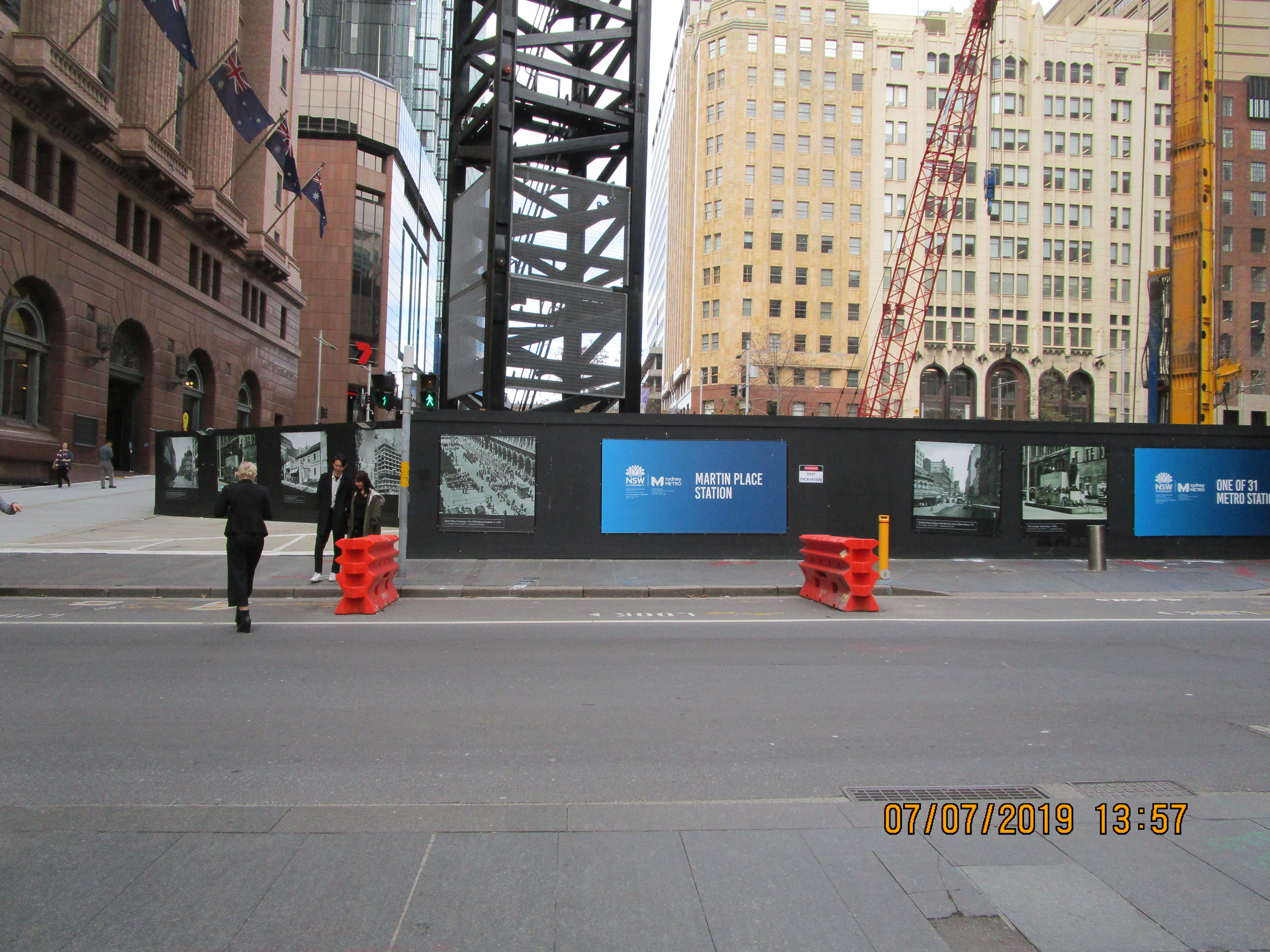
Construction of the underground interchange at Martin Place station, July 2019

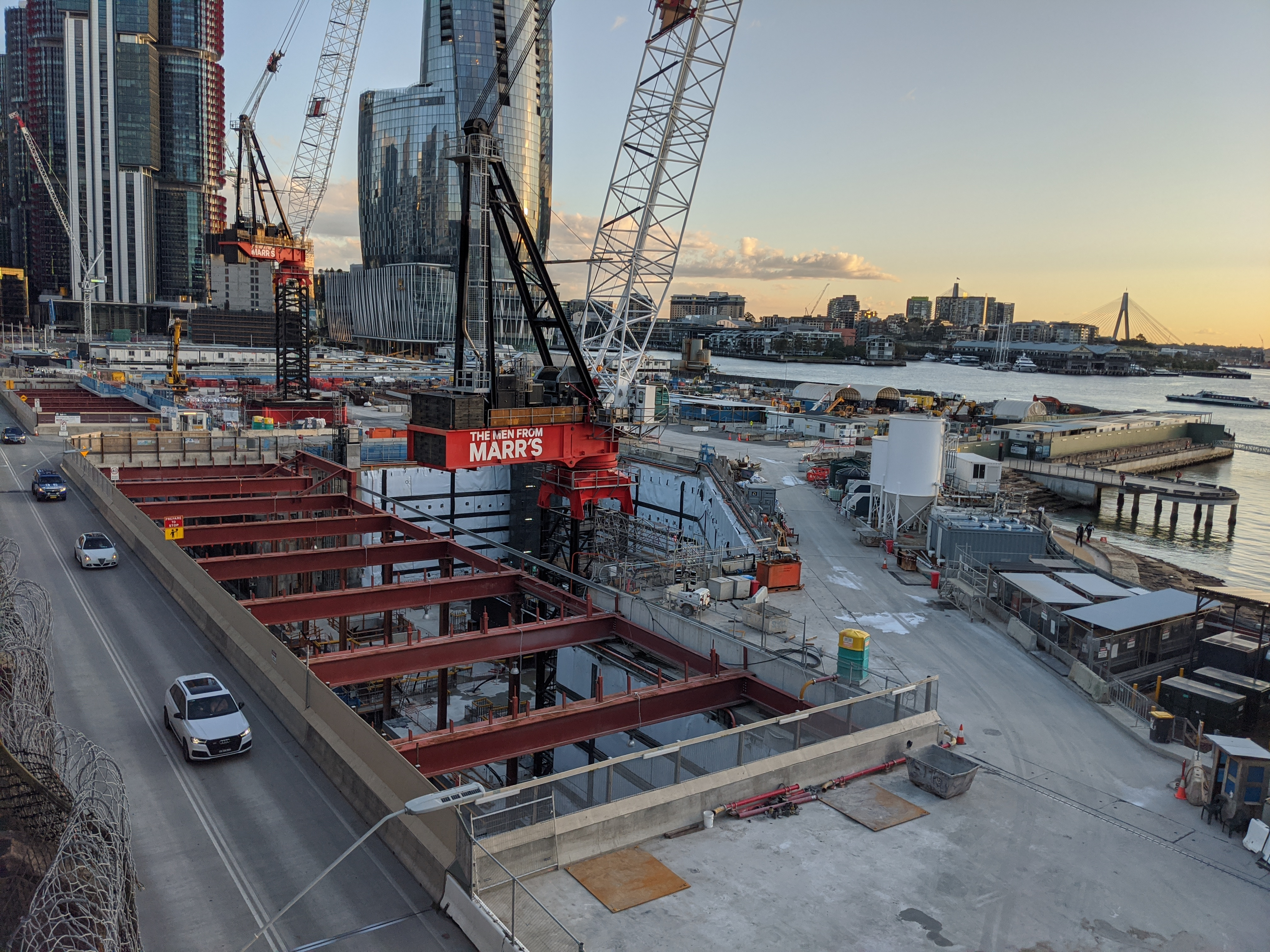
The Barangaroo station box under construction in September 2020

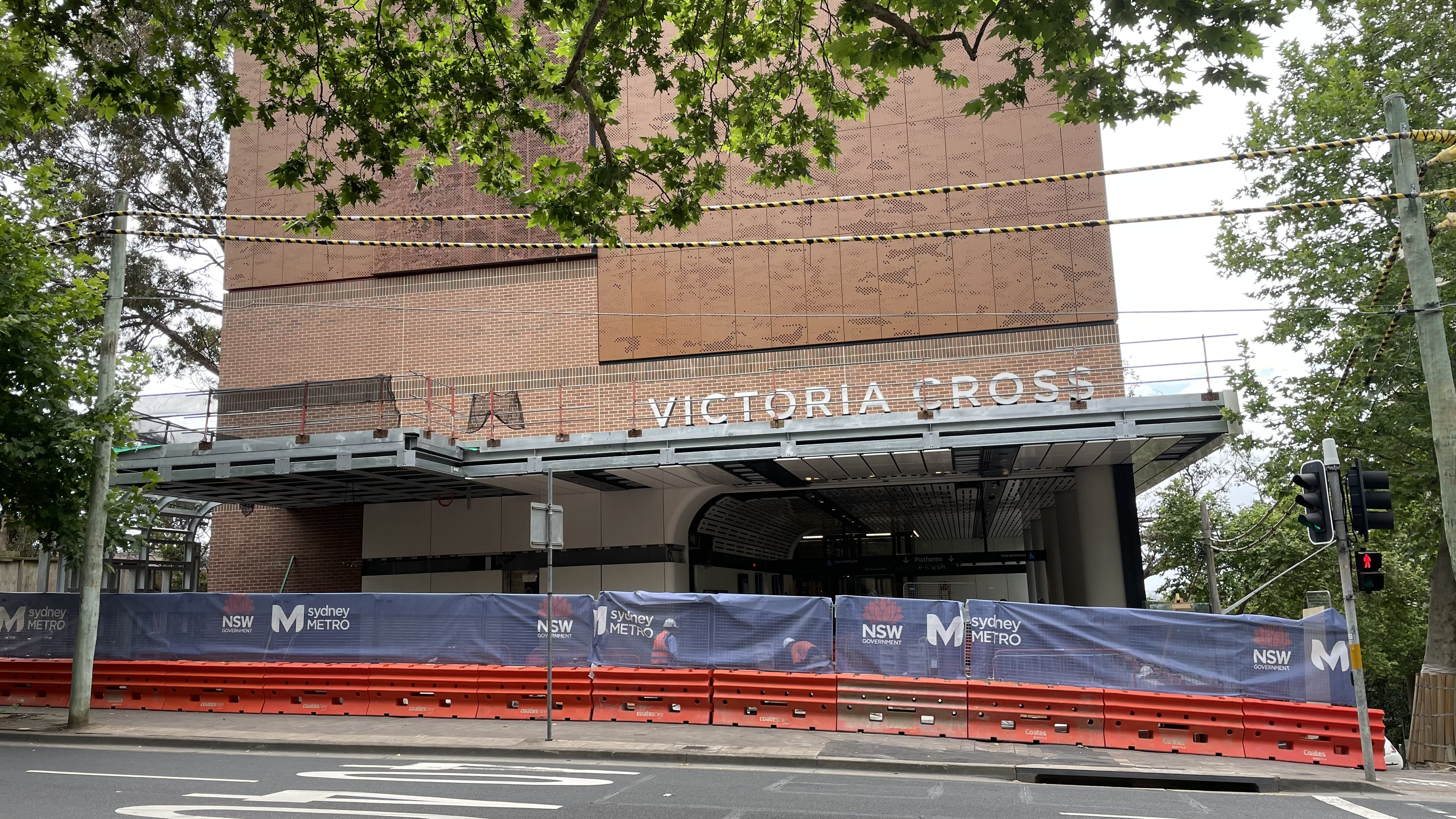
Victoria Cross station, November 2023

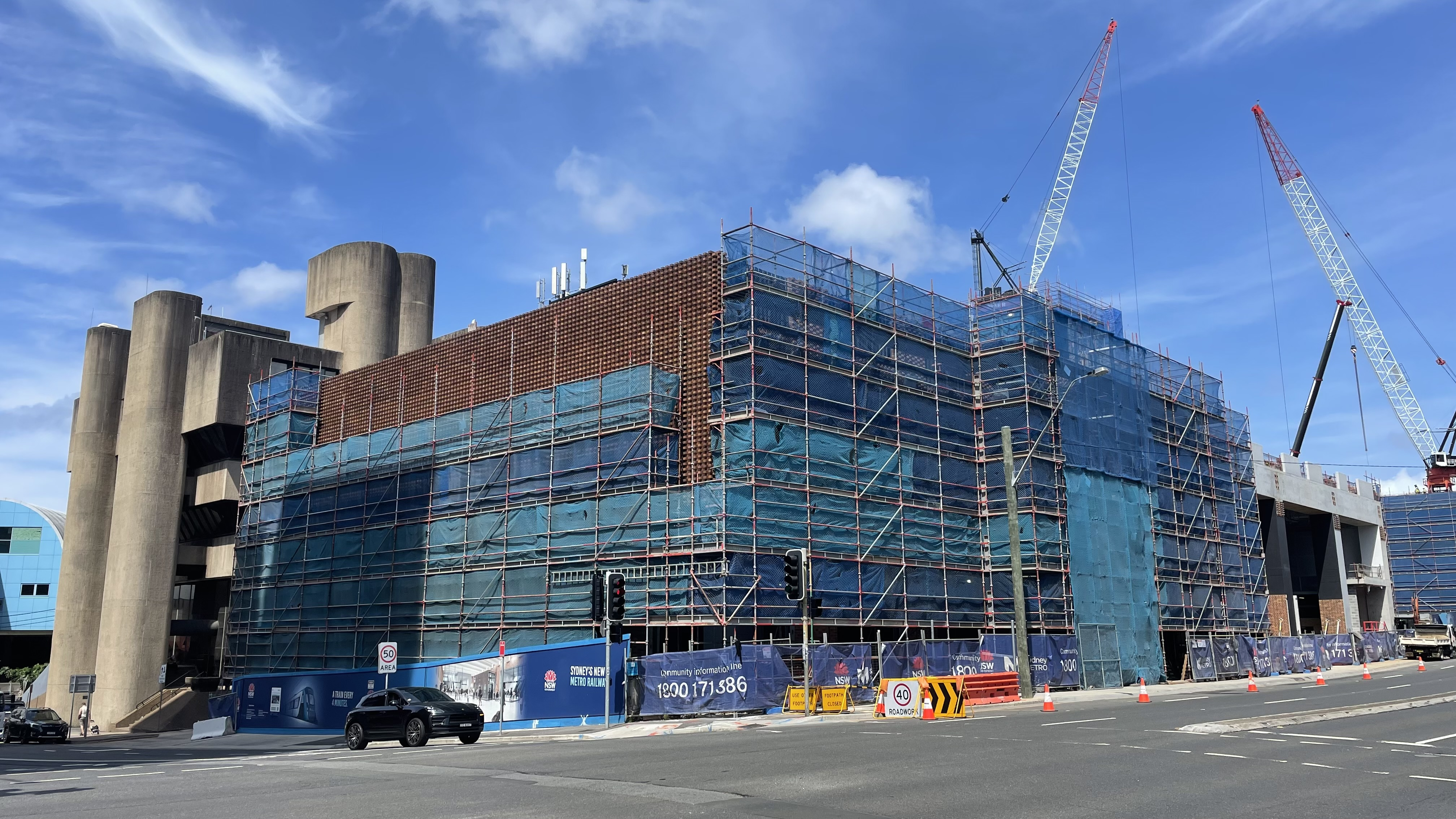
Crows Nest station, November 2023

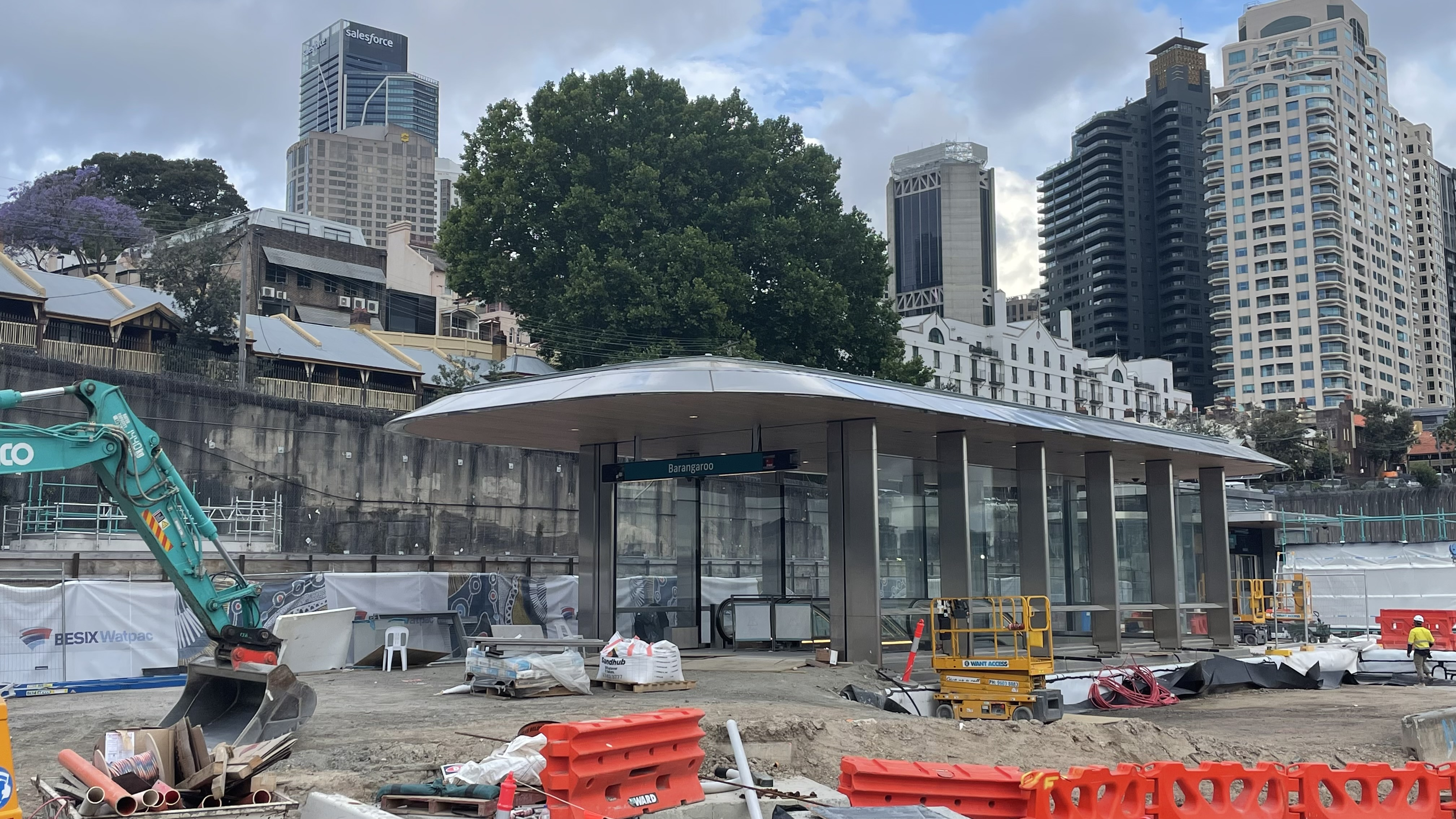
Barangaroo station, November 2023

=== Sydenham to Bankstown section ===
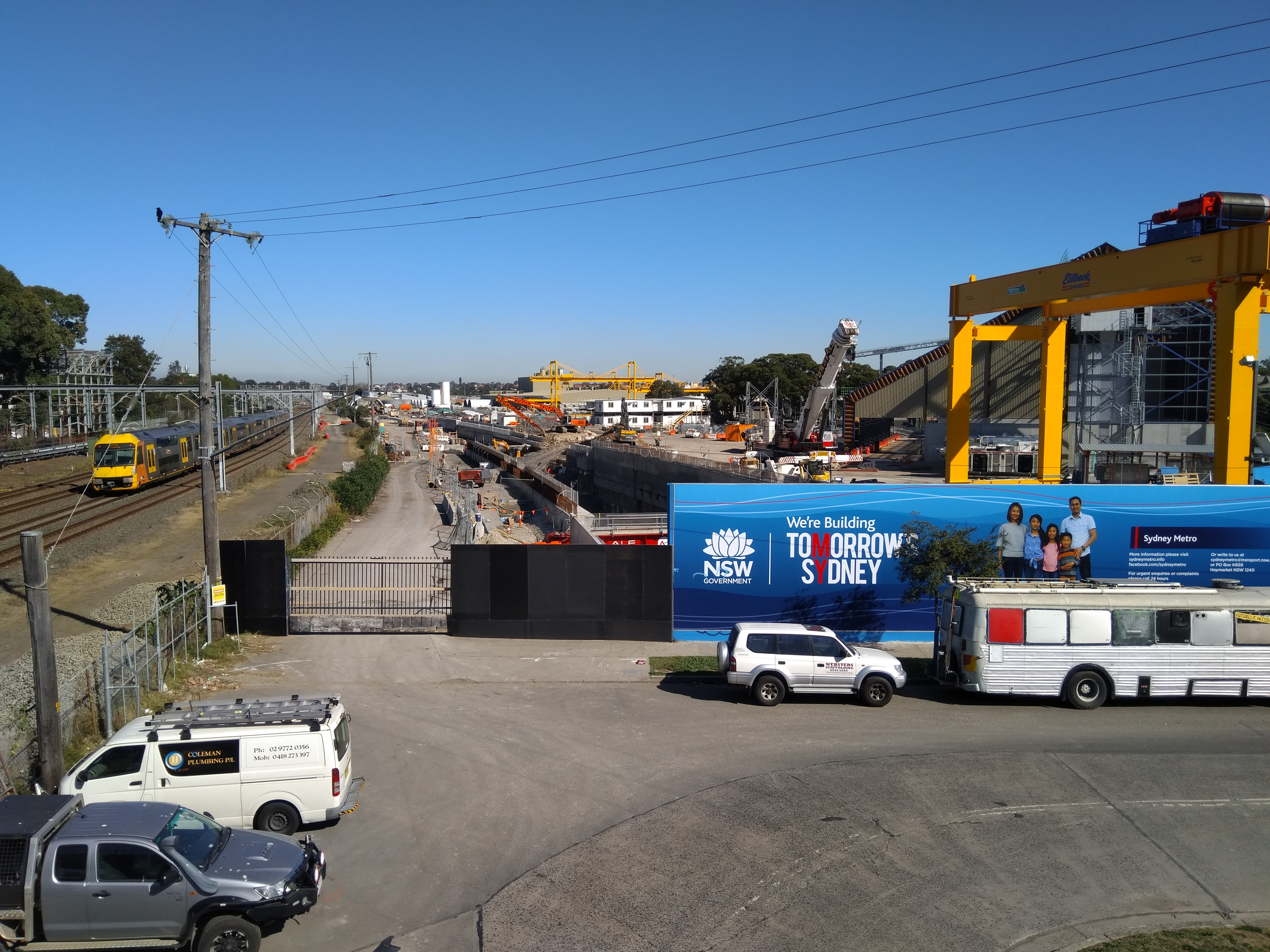
Excavation of the Marrickville dive in August 2018

From Sydenham, the Sydney Metro takes over the existing Bankstown railway line between Sydenham and Bankstown, which has been converted for use by single-deck autonomous trains with platform-edge doors. Bankstown became an interchange station between M1 Metro North West & Bankstown and T6 Lidcombe & Bankstown services. The conversion and incorporation of this section of track into Sydney Metro has not been without controversy, with a letter written by four former rail executives John Brew, Ron Christie, Bob O'Loughlin and Dick Day casting doubts on the government's claims of improved reliability as well as warning that commuters west of Bankstown face additional interchange for travel towards the City Circle.

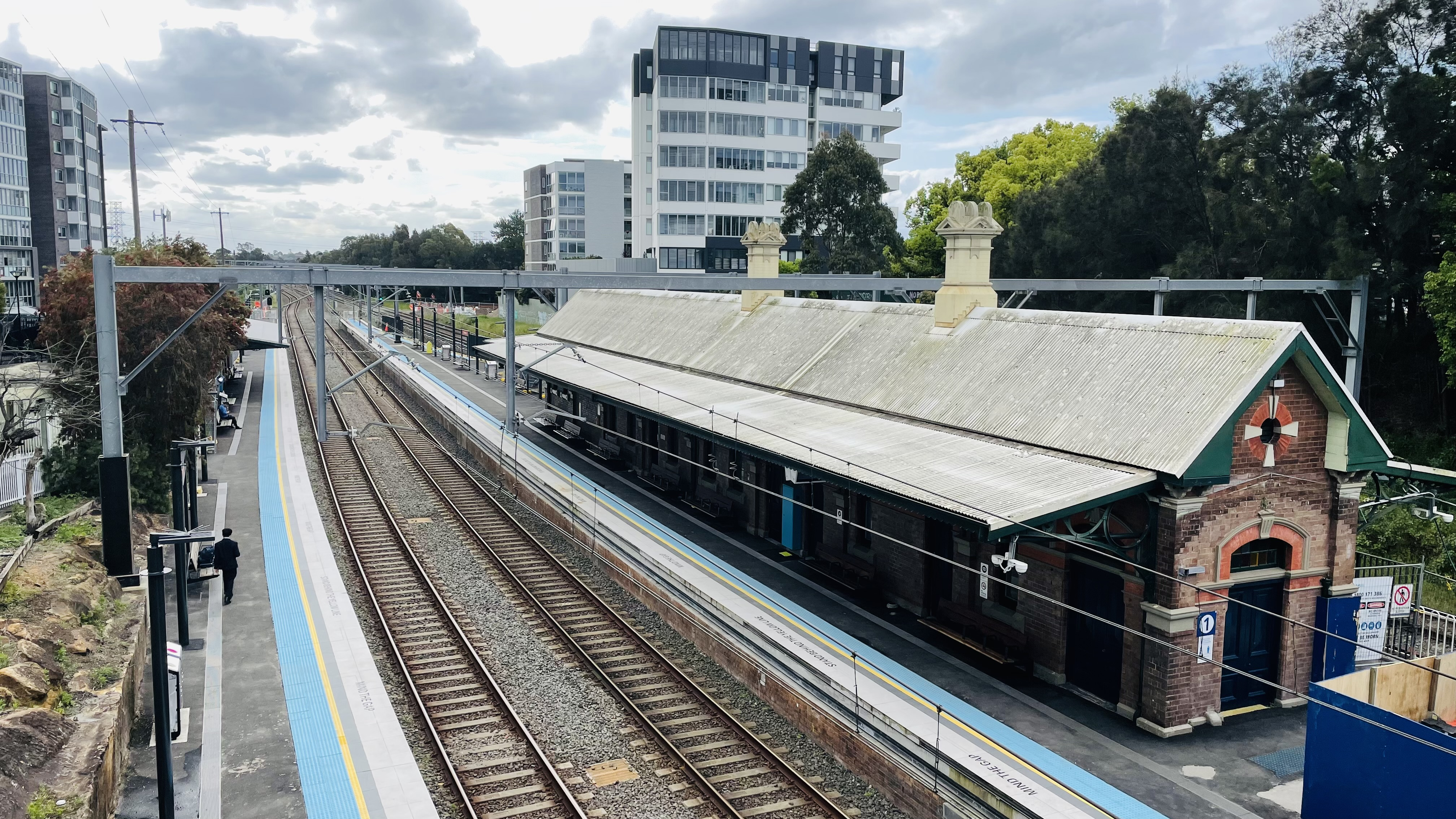
The Sydenham to Bankstown phase of the project involved the conversion and upgrade of large parts of the current suburban Bankstown line to rapid transit standards.

Planning approval of the upgrade of Bankstown line between Sydenham and Bankstown was received in December 2018. Beginning in December 2019, the Bankstown line between Sydenham and Campsie and the Illawarra railway line between Hurstville and Central was closed during certain periods in order to allow the Bankstown line to be converted and upgraded to metro standards.

The NSW Legislative Council announced, on 22 August 2019, an inquiry into the "Sydenham - Bankstown Line conversion" examining decision-making in relation to the transport project. The inquiry to be conducted by Portfolio Committee 6 - Transport and Customer Service and chaired by Abigail Boyd released its report on 9 April 2020, recommending that the conversion not take place with Sydney Metro instead to terminate at Sydenham. The NSW Government rejected most recommendations from this report.

In December 2020, Transport for NSW announced it was considering the reinstatement of the Liverpool to City service via Regents Park and Lidcombe with a shuttle branch service would run between Lidcombe and Bankstown when the Bankstown line closes for conversion to metro in 2024. Regents Park would be the main interchange point between both services as the direct train between Bankstown and Liverpool would be withdrawn. These changes were confirmed in late 2023 with the NSW Government ruling out earlier plans to close stations in the West of Bankstown between Bankstown and Lidcombe/Cabramatta when Sydney Metro City & Southwest opened.

In April 2023, it was confirmed by the government that the conversion of the Bankstown line was delayed by at least twelve months and was expected to open in 2025, after the main CBD tunnel commences operations.

In response to the recommendations of the Sydney Metro Review, in August 2023, the state government announced the continuation of the Sydney Metro Southwest project with the conversion of the line between Sydenham and Bankstown requiring a 12-month temporary closure from September 2024 onwards.

In September 2024, the Rail, Tram and Bus Union (RTBU) threatened to go on strike due to what they saw as unreasonable working conditions on Metro services relating to measures such as putting a qualified Sydney Trains driver on every Metro train, and reducing fares to 50 cents as has happened in Queensland.

In March 2025, the Minister for Transport, John Graham, announced that, due to delays caused by industrial action, the project would not open until 2026.

On 3 April 2025, the Southwest section of the M1 metro line received its first test train.

On 22 October 2026, it was announced that the final documentation necessary for the extension was approved. It opened on 30 October 2026.

=== Cost ===
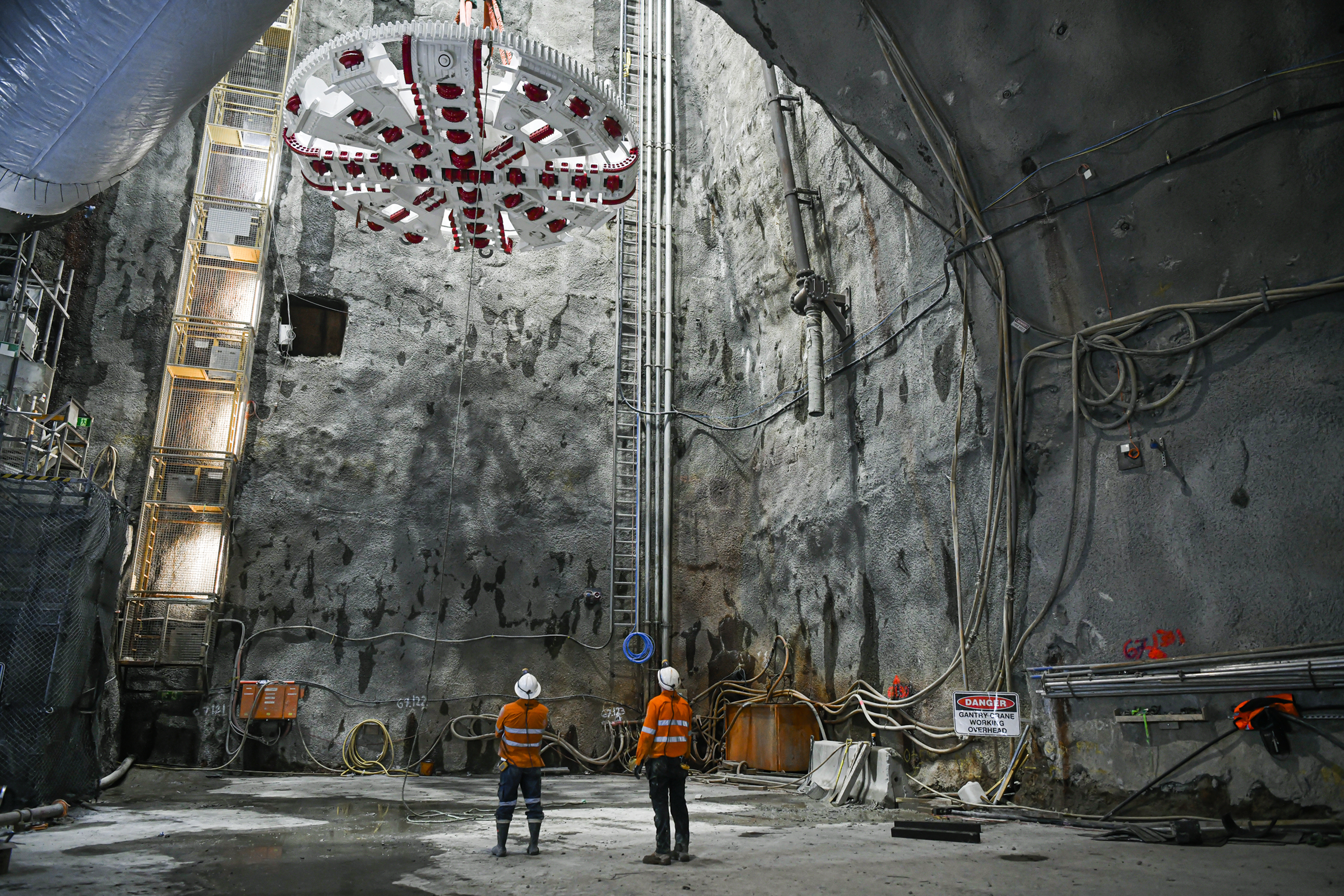
A tunnel boring machine being assembled at the Barangaroo station dive site in June 2019. Budget overspends were primarily driven by the cost of the underground sections of the line.

In 2020, The Sydney Morning Herald reported that an internal government review found the project had blown out by $4.3 billion for a projected cost of $16.8 billion. Detailed budgeting was not released as part of the business case in 2016, but the project was originally estimated to cost between $11.5 and $12.5 billion. These increases were in part driven by unexpected costs of building the underground CBD stations.

The new Labor government of Chris Minns elected in the 2023 state election initiated a broad review into the Sydney Metro projects in April 2023, and announced that internal documents under the previous government of Dominic Perrottet had shown that the City & Southwest project was budgeted to cost $20.5 billion, a $9 billion escalation from the initial projections. The ABC reported that further increases were possible before the line is fully completed in 2025.

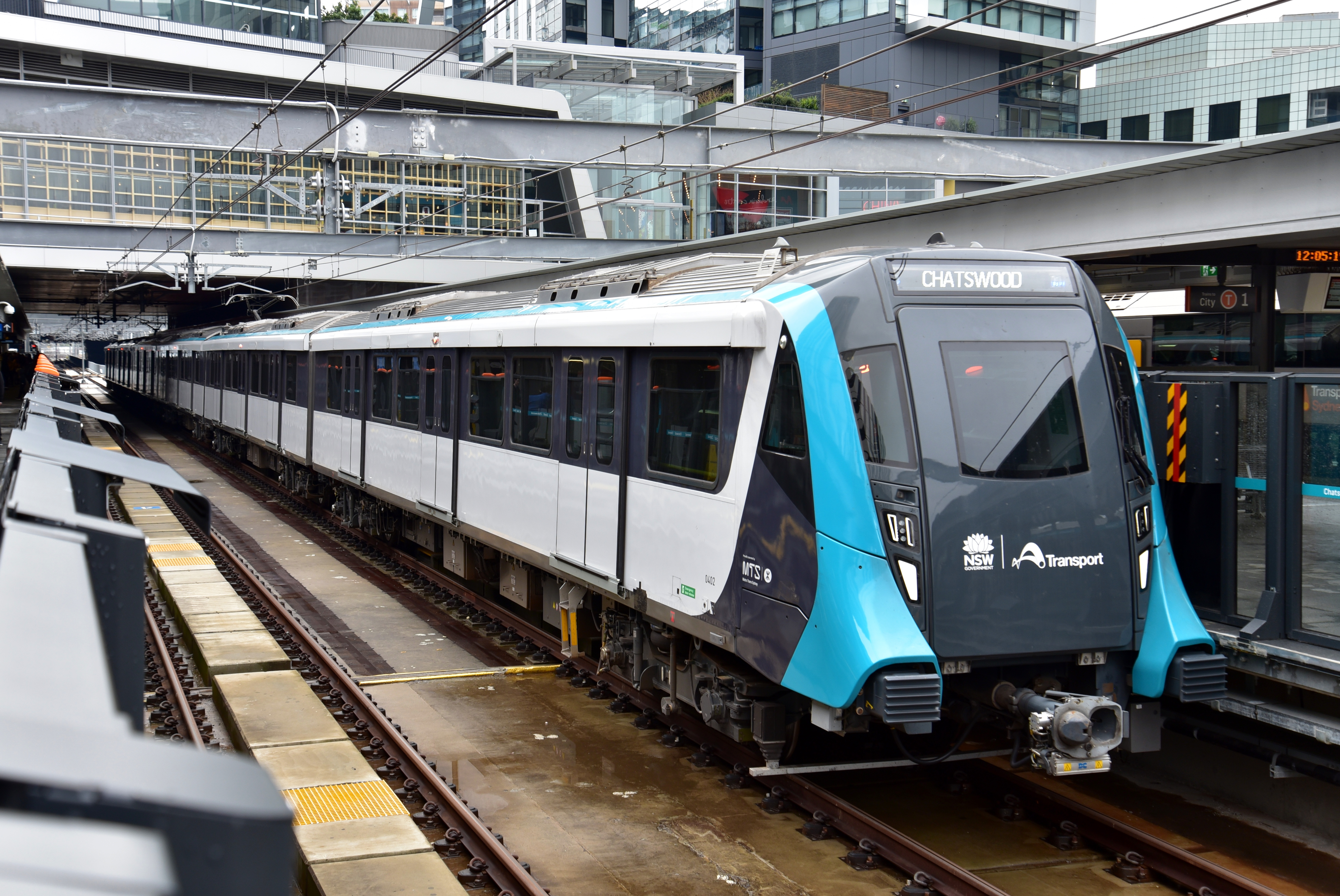
A Metropolis Stock train at Chatswood, which served as the original terminus of the M1 Metro North West & Bankstown Line until 19 August 2024

== Route ==
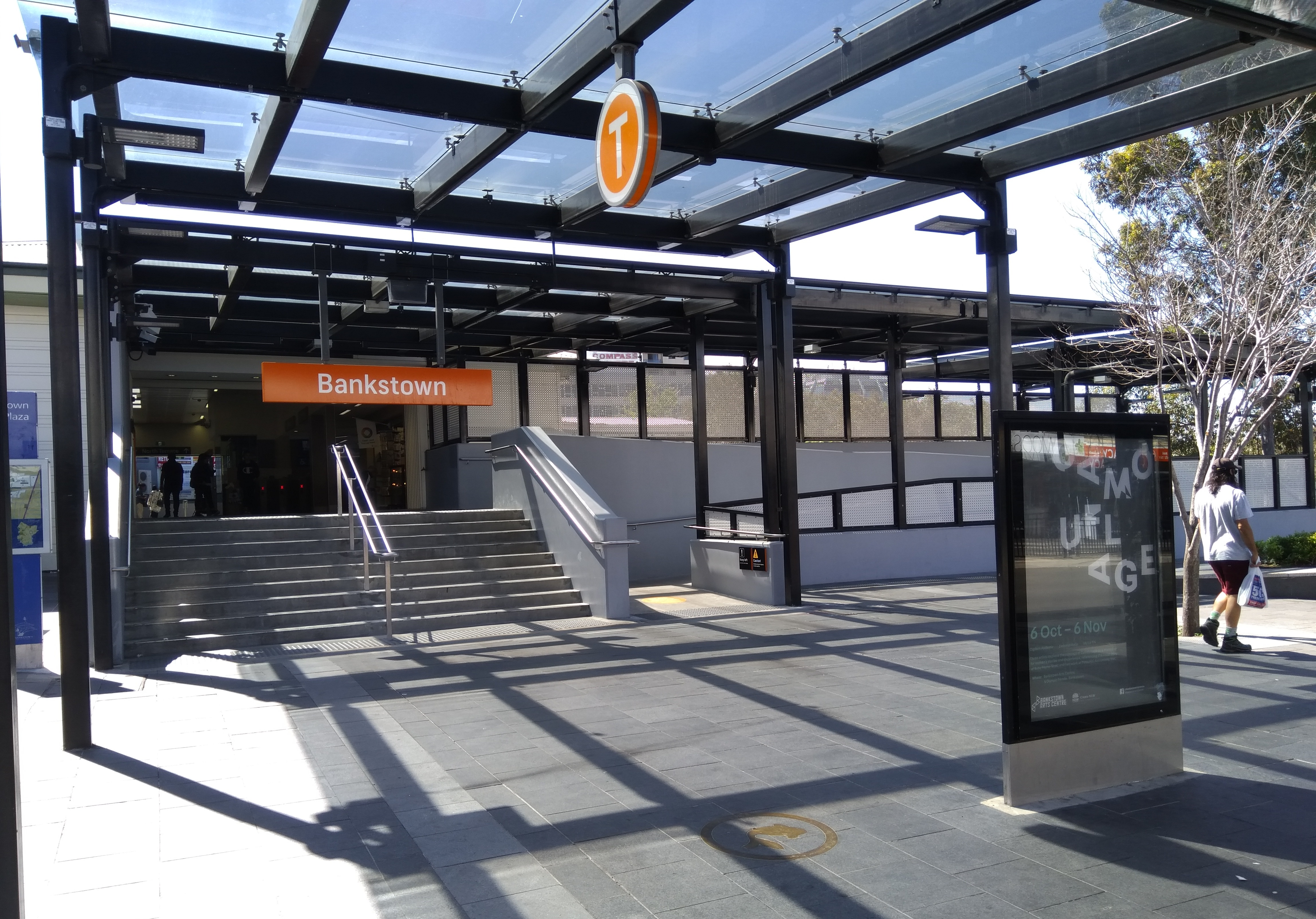
Bankstown station will become the final terminus of the Sydney Metro City & Southwest in 2026.

The project is a major extension of the M1 Metro North West & Bankstown Line, connecting Chatswood–the line's initial terminus–to Sydenham, with new stations at Crows Nest, Victoria Cross, Barangaroo, Martin Place, Pitt Street, Central and Waterloo. At Sydenham, the new line joins the existing Bankstown railway line, which has been converted to allow single-deck autonomous trains to run between Sydenham and Bankstown as part of the Sydney Metro City & Southwest project.

The original list of stations consisted of Crows Nest, Victoria Cross, Martin Place, Pitt Street (now Gadigal), Central, Sydenham and 10 stations on the Bankstown line. Potential additional stations were also proposed for the industrial area of Artarmon (underground), St Leonards, Barangaroo and either the University of Sydney or Waterloo. Barangaroo station was confirmed in June 2015 and Waterloo was confirmed in December. The other three stations will not be included in the project.

West of Bankstown, Sydney Trains continues to operate services as the T6 Lidcombe & Bankstown Line, while services to St Peters and Erskineville east of Sydenham were picked up by the T4 Eastern Suburbs & Illawarra Line and T8 Airport & South Line.

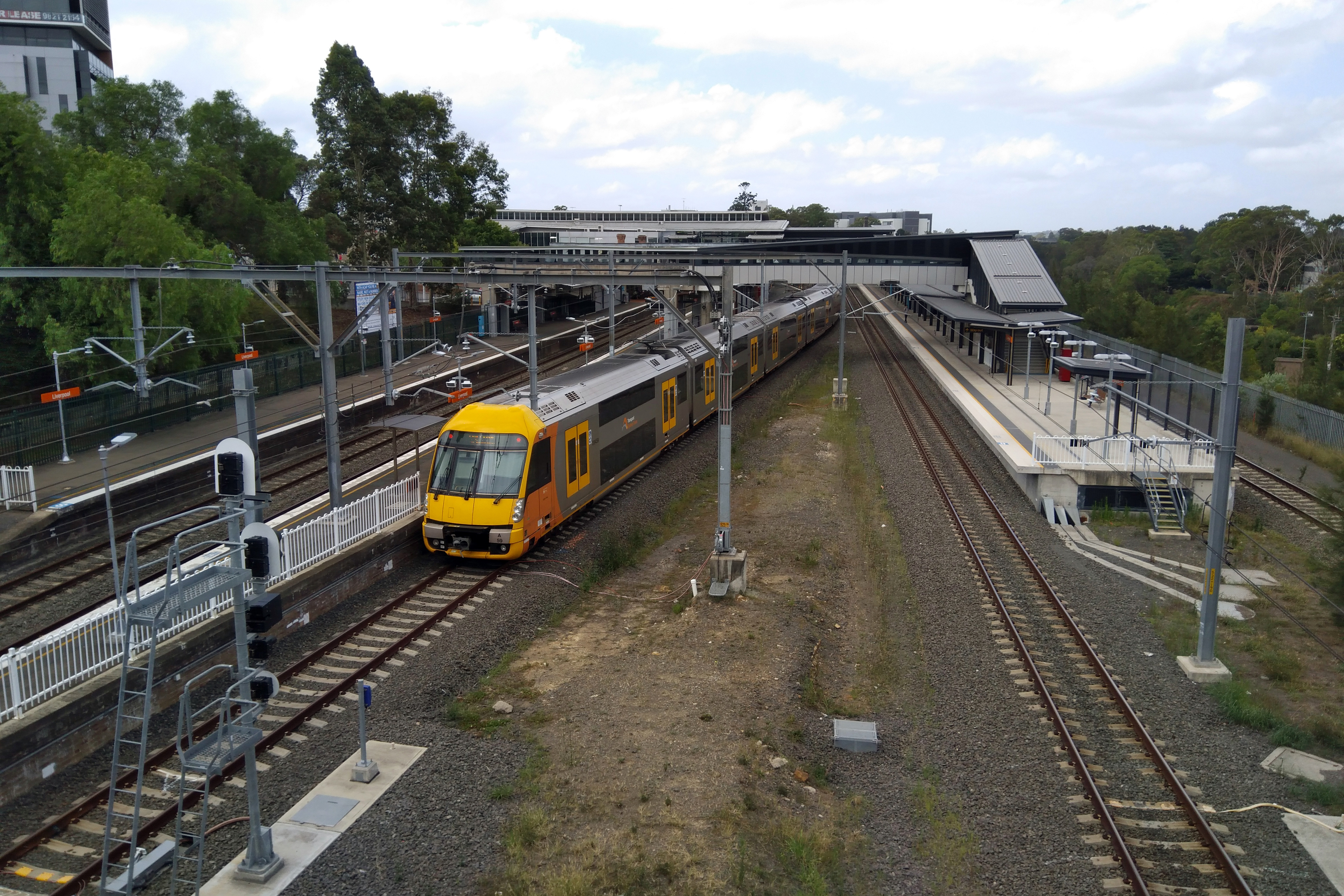
Liverpool was proposed as a potential future extension to the line.

=== Potential extension ===
A scoping study into rail investment to service Western Sydney and the proposed Western Sydney Airport was announced by the New South Wales and Australian governments in November 2015. The study's final report was released in March 2018 and included a proposal to extend the Sydney Metro City & Southwest from Bankstown to Liverpool. The extension was unlikely to be built for at least 20 years. Transport for NSW was considering rapid buses and trackless trams for the corridor although following the 2023 New South Wales state election, this Metro extension has been cancelled.

== Previous proposals ==
=== CBD Rail Link ===
The CBD Rail Link was a component of the now-cancelled Metropolitan Rail Expansion Program (MREP) in Sydney. First announced in 2005, the line was to have started at Redfern Station, travelled under the city centre, crossed under Sydney Harbour, passed through the lower North Shore and ended at the existing Chatswood railway station. It was to have provided the centre section of a planned North West-CBD-South West rail arc connecting major areas of employment with the CBD and airport. Alternative names for the planned route have included the Redfern to Chatswood Rail Link (RCRL), Redfern to Chatswood Harbour Rail Link and MetroPitt.

The proposal was announced by Labor Premier Bob Carr on 15 June 2005 (shortly before his resignation), and formed part of the $8 billion Metropolitan Rail Expansion Project (MREP). The MREP consisted of the New South Wales government's $8 billion North West – CBD – South West Line, including the North West Rail Link (to extend from Cheltenham to Rouse Hill), and the spur to Leppington in Sydney's South West. The six kilometre CBD Rail Link was slated to cost $5 billion, and was to include duplicated tracks on the North Shore line between St Leonards and Chatswood. It was to provide a second railway line transversing Sydney Harbour to ease congestion at Town Hall and Wynyard stations, both considerably crowded and unable to be easily expanded, and to reduce travel times between the city and the lower North Shore.

The government's previous plan of constructing an additional CBD underground line was known as MetroWest. It was to have run from Haymarket in the city's Chinatown precinct near Darling Harbour, along the western edge of the city under Sussex or Kent Street and either ended at Wynyard station or continued over the harbour 'strapped' to the Sydney Harbour Bridge. This option would not have served the part of the city experiencing the fastest growth of employment, and would have necessitated the destruction of eight office buildings. A previous MetroPitt proposal, travelling further east (and under its namesake Pitt Street) and through the financial district, could also be built deeper underground, limiting the impact on existing infrastructure.

In 2006, both of these corridors were protected with planning buffers to allow the option of future construction. Developers who want to excavate deeper than two metres within a 25-metre buffer zone of the corridors need to seek RailCorp's approval.

In the plan the stations along the CBD Rail Link would have included:

- Redfern – connecting to the metro lines to Hurstville, Bankstown and Liverpool
- Central – interchanging with all lines through the CBD then
- Pitt Street
- Martin Place – interchanging with the Eastern Suburbs & Illawarra Line
- Circular Quay – interchanging with the Bankstown, Inner West, South & Airport/East Hills Lines
- Victoria Cross
- Crows Nest
- St Leonards – interchanging with the North Shore and Northern Lines
- Chatswood – interchanging with the North Shore and Northern Lines

A map of the protected corridors suggested there may have been the potential for another station at Macquarie Place, between The Rocks and Castlereagh Street.

In March 2008 the State Government announced that the line would be cancelled, its role to be partly superseded by future metro rail lines.

=== Later Labor proposals ===
One of the metro lines announced in 2009 by the Rees state government was CBD Metro, which ran along a similar CBD alignment to the current Sydney Metro proposal between Central and Barangaroo. However, the alignment continued west from Baranagaroo, crossing Darling Harbour and heading towards Rozelle and beyond. Therefore, there were no metro lines proposed linking the CBD to Chatswood.

In 2010, the new Keneally government cancelled the entire metro project, and the CBD Relief Line & Western Express concept was announced as replacement. The relief line was largely a return to the CBD Rail Link proposal, but used the MetroWest alignment instead. The line would have offered an alternative heavy rail link in the CBD between Redfern and Wynyard, but also did not cross the harbour into the North Shore. The relief line was cancelled by the incoming Liberal-Nationals government when they won the 2011 state election, who then announced the current project in 2014.

== See also ==
- Transport in Sydney in the 2010s
- Metro Tunnel – similar project in Melbourne
- Cross River Rail – similar project in Brisbane
- City Rail Link – similar project in Auckland, New Zealand
