= Gadigal metro station =

Sydney Metro station

Gadigal
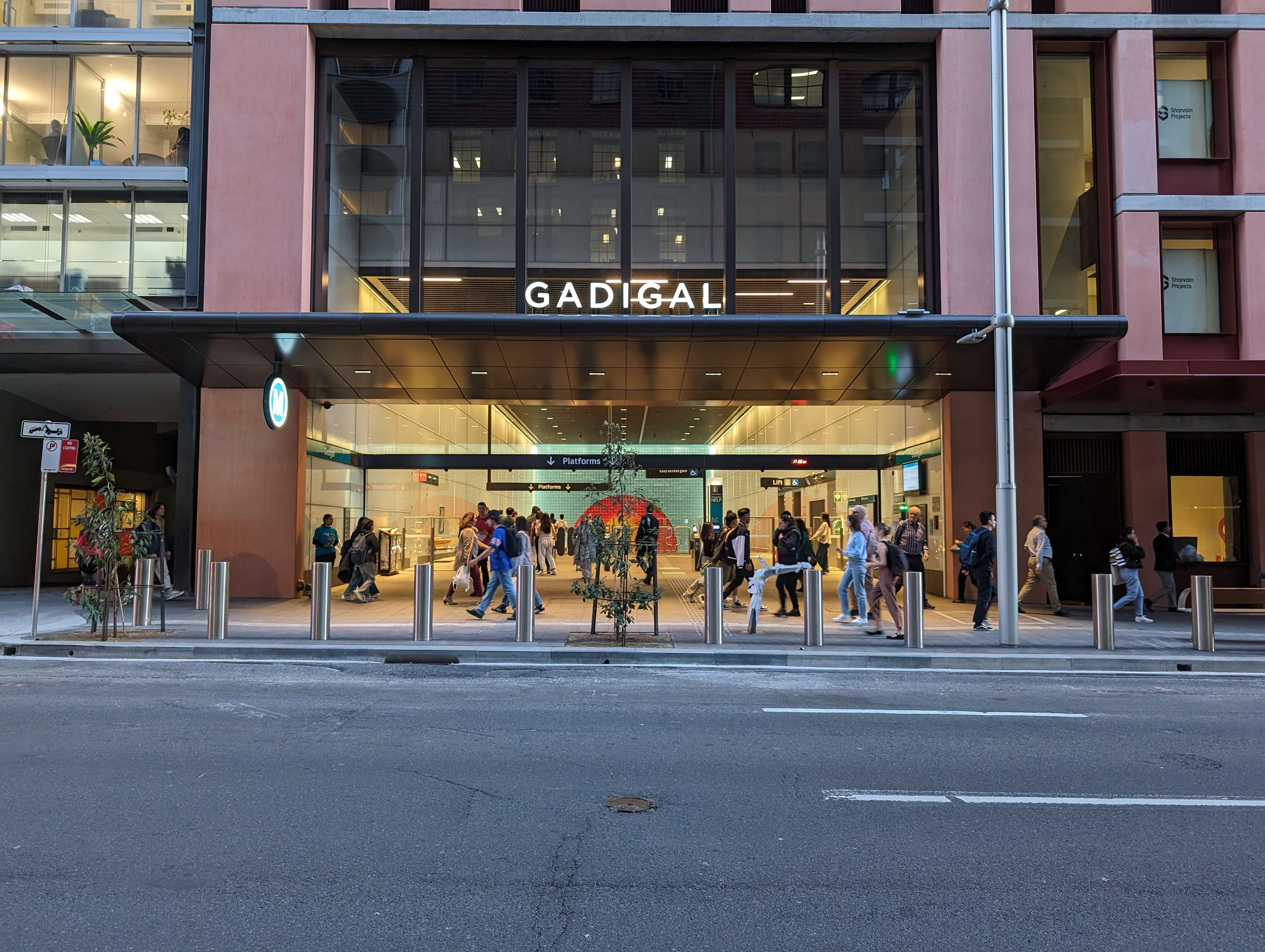
- Station entrance from Bathurst St, August 2024

General information
- Location: Corner Pitt Street & Castlereagh Street; Sydney, New South Wales; Australia
- Coordinates: 33°52′22″S 151°12′32″E
- Owner: Transport Asset Manager of New South Wales
- Operator: Metro Trains Sydney
- Line: Metro North West & Bankstown Line
- Distance: 1.1 km (0.68 mi) from Central
- Platforms: 2
- Tracks: 2
- Connections: Town Hall; Bus; Town Hall

Construction
- Structure type: Underground
- Depth: 20 metres (66 ft)
- Accessible: Yes

Other information
- Status: Open

History
- Opened: 19 August 2024
- Former names: Pitt Street (during construction)

Services
Preceding station	Sydney Metro	Following station
Martin Place towards Tallawong	M1 Metro North West & Bankstown Line	Central towards Bankstown
Location
- Location of Gadigal station

Gadigal metro station is an underground Sydney Metro station in the central business district of Sydney, New South Wales, Australia which opened in August 2024. The station serves the Metro North West & Bankstown Line, with services operating between Sydenham and Tallawong. Services are expected to extend from Sydenham to Bankstown by 2026. Gadigal station was known during planning and construction as Pitt Street.

== Description ==
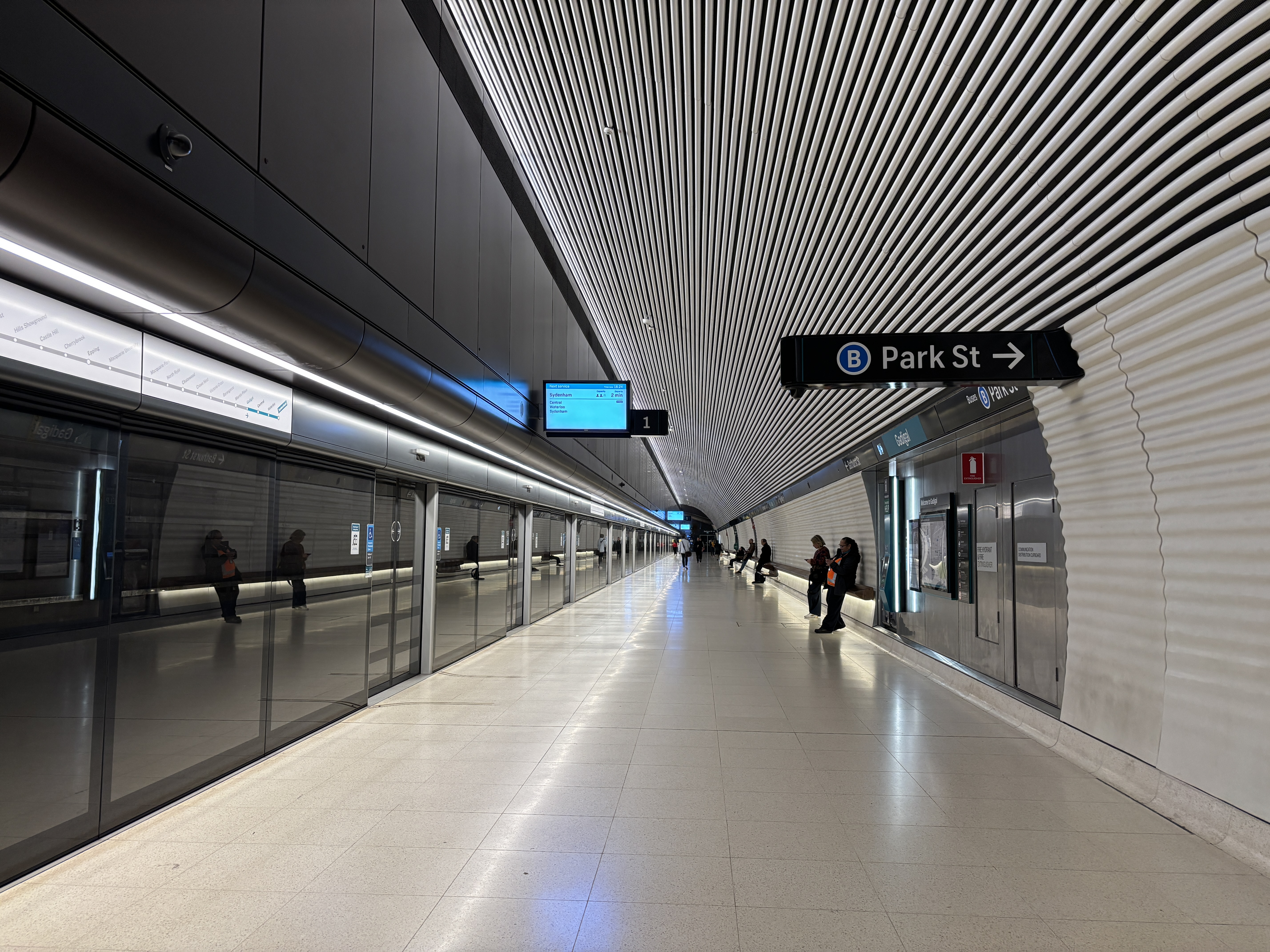
Platform 1

Gadigal station is located within the Sydney central business district, two blocks east of Town Hall and two blocks west of Hyde Park. The adjacent station to the north is Martin Place station and the adjacent station to the south is Central station. Gadigal station was designed to relieve pressure on Town Hall station, an important interchange on the Sydney Trains network less than 150 metres (490 ft) west of Gadigal station. Unlike Martin Place station, there is no underground walkway between Gadigal and Town Hall stations as planners wanted to avoid creating a megastation and to avoid problems at one station affecting the other.

Gadigal station has two entrances. The north entrance is on the northern side of Park Street between Pitt and Castlereagh streets. The south entrance is on the south-eastern corner of Pitt and Bathurst streets. The northbound platform is located beneath Pitt Street and the southbound platform is located beneath Castlereagh Street. As the tunnel had to be bored above the Cross City Tunnel, the platforms are 17 metres (56 ft) below Park Street and 20 metres (66 ft) below Bathurst Street, making Gadigal station the shallowest station on the City & Southwest project.

=== Artwork ===
At each entrance is an artwork titled The Underneath, by Callum Morton. This consists of two 12.5-metre-high (41 ft) tiled murals on the walls opposite the escalators at each entrance.

== History ==
=== Excavation ===
The contract for the excavation of the six stations and twin 15.5-kilometre (9.6 mi) bored tunnels on the Sydney Metro City and Southwest project was awarded to a joint venture between John Holland, CPB Contractors, and Ghella in June 2017, for A$2.81 billion. Demolition of buildings to make way for Pitt Street station began in August 2017. Excavators were craned to the top of buildings to complete the demolition from the top down. By April 2018, all eight buildings at the station's northern entrance had been demolished, the tallest of which was fourteen storeys. The four buildings at the station's southern entrance were demolished soon after as well. After that, concrete retaining walls were built so that the entrance shafts could be excavated. An acoustic shed was built over the sites to limit the impact of construction noise on surrounding areas.

By early 2019, the platform caverns were being excavated by roadheader machines. In August 2019, the first tunnel boring machine (TBM), Nancy, broke through the southern cavern wall to reach Pitt Street station, and the following month, the second TBM, Mum Shirl, reached the station. After undergoing maintenance, the TBMs continued tunnelling north towards Martin Place station. In November 2020, concrete lining and waterproofing the station was nearly complete, and by the end of 2020, excavation had been completed.

=== Station construction ===
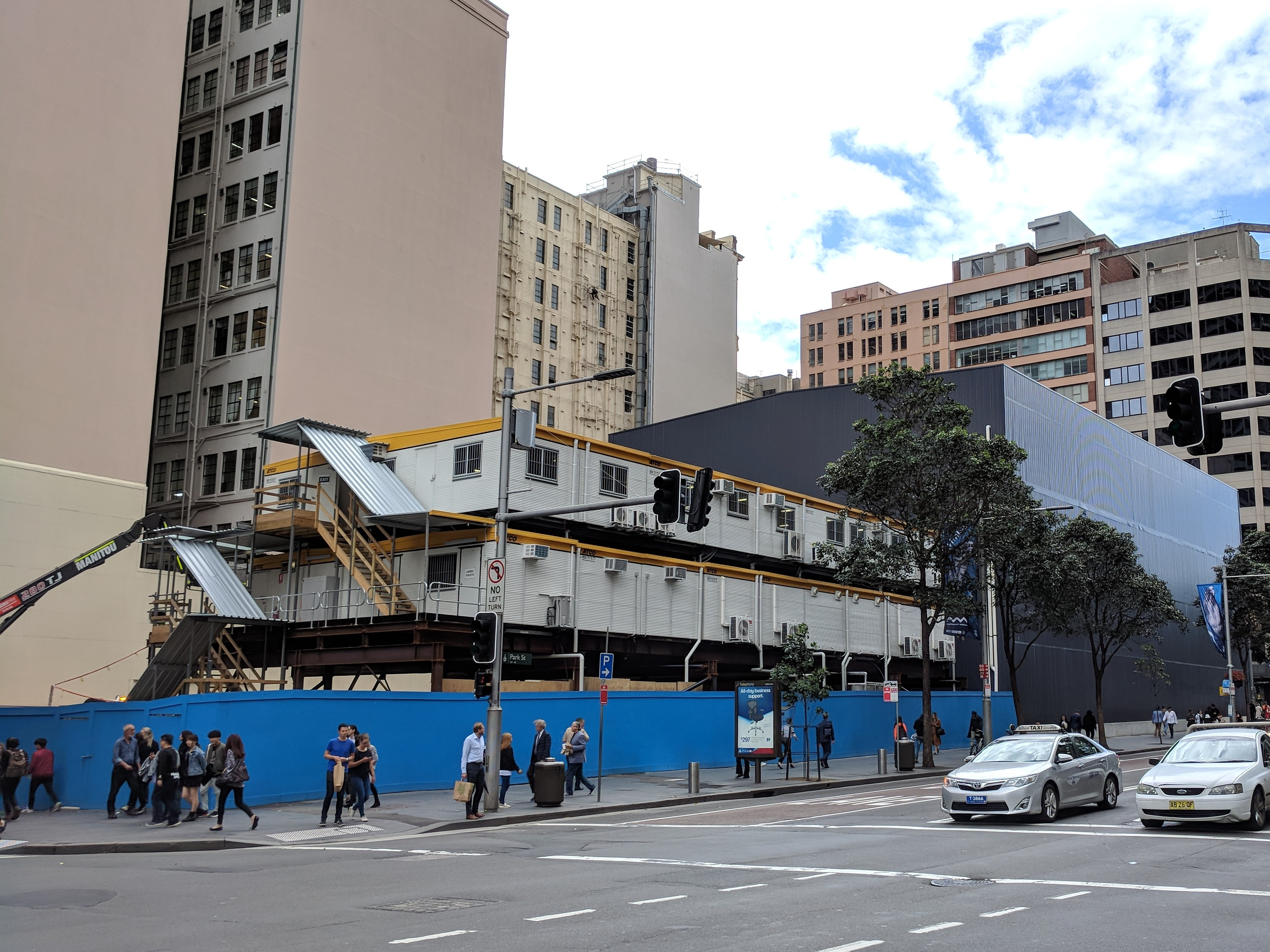
The northern entrance construction site, viewed from the corner of Park Street and Pitt Street, October 2018

In September 2019, a consortium of CPB Contractors, Oxford Properties and Grocon were awarded a $463 million contract to construct the station and design and construct two buildings above the station. Under the deal, the consortium also had to pay $369 million for the air rights above the station. CPB was responsible for the station's construction.

By the end of 2021, Pitt Street station's platforms, which were made out of 681 precast concrete sections, were built, and the concrete slabs for the tracks had been poured. By November 2022, the platform screen doors were in place and the southern entrance building's structure was complete. Five out of the southern entrance's six escalators were also in place, with the final escalator planned to be installed by the end of 2022. Over the following months, the eight escalators at the northern entrance were planned to be installed.

The station opened on 19 August 2024.

=== Name ===
Gadigal station was originally known as Pitt Street station. In August 2021, the Metropolitan Local Aboriginal Land Council proposed naming the station after the Gadigal people, the local Indigenous Australians. Transport for NSW and the minister for transport, Andrew Constance, supported the idea and sent it to the Geographical Names Board (GNB) for approval. During consultation, the GNB received 120 submissions, most of which were in support of the name Gadigal. However, in February 2022, two months after David Elliott was sworn in as the new transport minister, he intervened to propose the station be named after Indigenous army officer Reginald Saunders. In October 2023 though, after the election of a Labor government, the name Gadigal was finalised.

=== Over-station developments ===
There will be an over-station development at the northern and southern entrance, constructed by Oxford Properties and CPB Contractors. The northern entrance will have a 39-storey office building with a retail plaza named Parkline Place. The southern entrance will have a 39-storey building with 234 build to rent apartments named Indi Sydney.

== Services ==
Gadigal station is served by the Metro North West & Bankstown Line. This line is operated under contract by Metro Trains Sydney. The Metro North West Line run from Tallawong station to the north-west to Bankstown station to the south-west.

The Metro North West Line is planned to operate at a four-minute headway during peak and a ten-minute headway outside of peak.

Platform	Line	Stopping pattern	Notes
1	M1 Metro North West & Bankstown Line	Services to Bankstown	
2	M1 Metro North West & Bankstown Line	Services to Tallawong	
