= Victoria Cross metro station =

Railway station in North Sydney, Australia

Victoria Cross
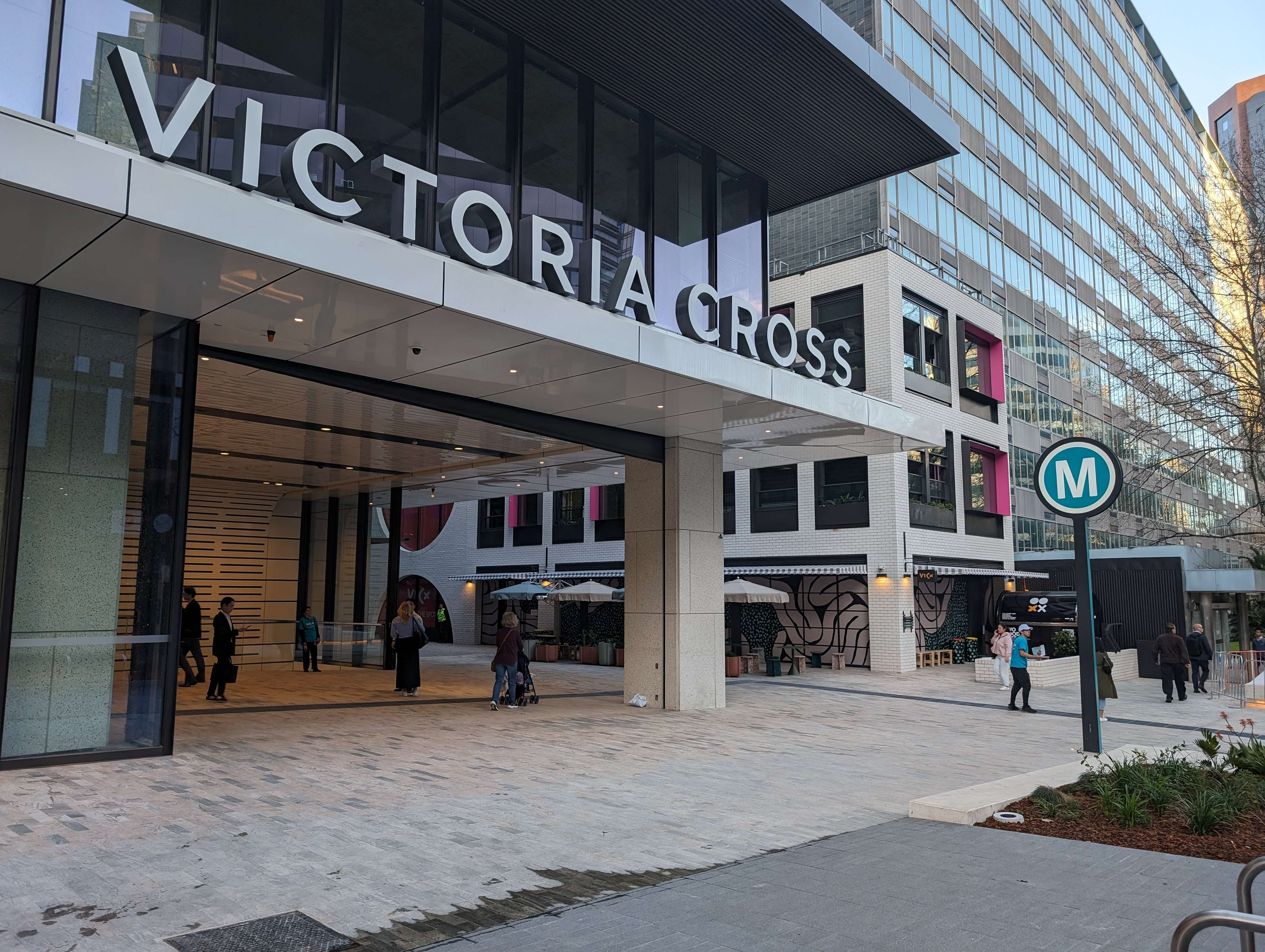
- Station entrance from Miller Street South, August 2024

General information
- Location: Miller Street, North Sydney; Australia
- Coordinates: 33.8372415°S 151.2075279°E
- Owner: New South Wales Government via Transport Asset Manager of New South Wales
- Operator: Metro Trains Sydney
- Line: Metro North West & Bankstown Line
- Distance: 6.10 km (3.79 mi) from Central
- Platforms: 2
- Tracks: 2
- Connections: North Sydney; Bus

Construction
- Structure type: Underground
- Accessible: Yes

Other information
- Status: Open
- Website: www.sydneymetro.info

History
- Opened: 19 August 2024

Services
Preceding station	Sydney Metro	Following station
Crows Nest towards Tallawong	M1 Metro North West & Bankstown Line	Barangaroo towards Bankstown
Location

Victoria Cross railway station is an underground Sydney Metro station located beneath the central business district of North Sydney, New South Wales, Australia. The station is served by the Metro North West & Bankstown Line. It opened on 19 August 2024.

== History ==
A station at Victoria Cross was proposed in 2001 as part of Co-ordinator General of Rail Ron Christie's Strategic Plan for Rail, as a stop for trains travelling to the north-west, Northern Beaches, Cronulla and Macarthur. The new station, a block away from the existing station in Blue Street, was designed to take pressure off the constrained interchange, which dates from 1932. The Government of New South Wales incorporated many of Christie's ideas in its Metropolitan Rail Expansion Program (MREP) in 2005, including Victoria Cross station as part of a future Redfern to Chatswood railway line. When the MREP was cancelled in 2008, the idea of a station at Victoria Cross was dropped as well.

The concept of a Redfern to Chatswood line was partially revived by the NSW Government as part of the Sydney's Rail Future plan in 2012, this time as a metro stop. A detailed concept plan, including a station at Victoria Cross, went on public exhibition in 2015. The station entrance is on the eastern side of Miller Street between Berry and Mount streets.

In June 2017, changes were announced, including an additional station entrance on McLaren Street. The second entrance is notable for being the first lift-only entrance to a passenger train station in Australia, and consists of four lifts capable of carrying 27 people each.

The station opened on 19 August 2024.

== Platforms and services ==
Platform	Line	Stopping pattern	Notes
1	M1 Metro North West & Bankstown Line	Services to Bankstown	
2	M1 Metro North West & Bankstown Line	Services to Tallawong	

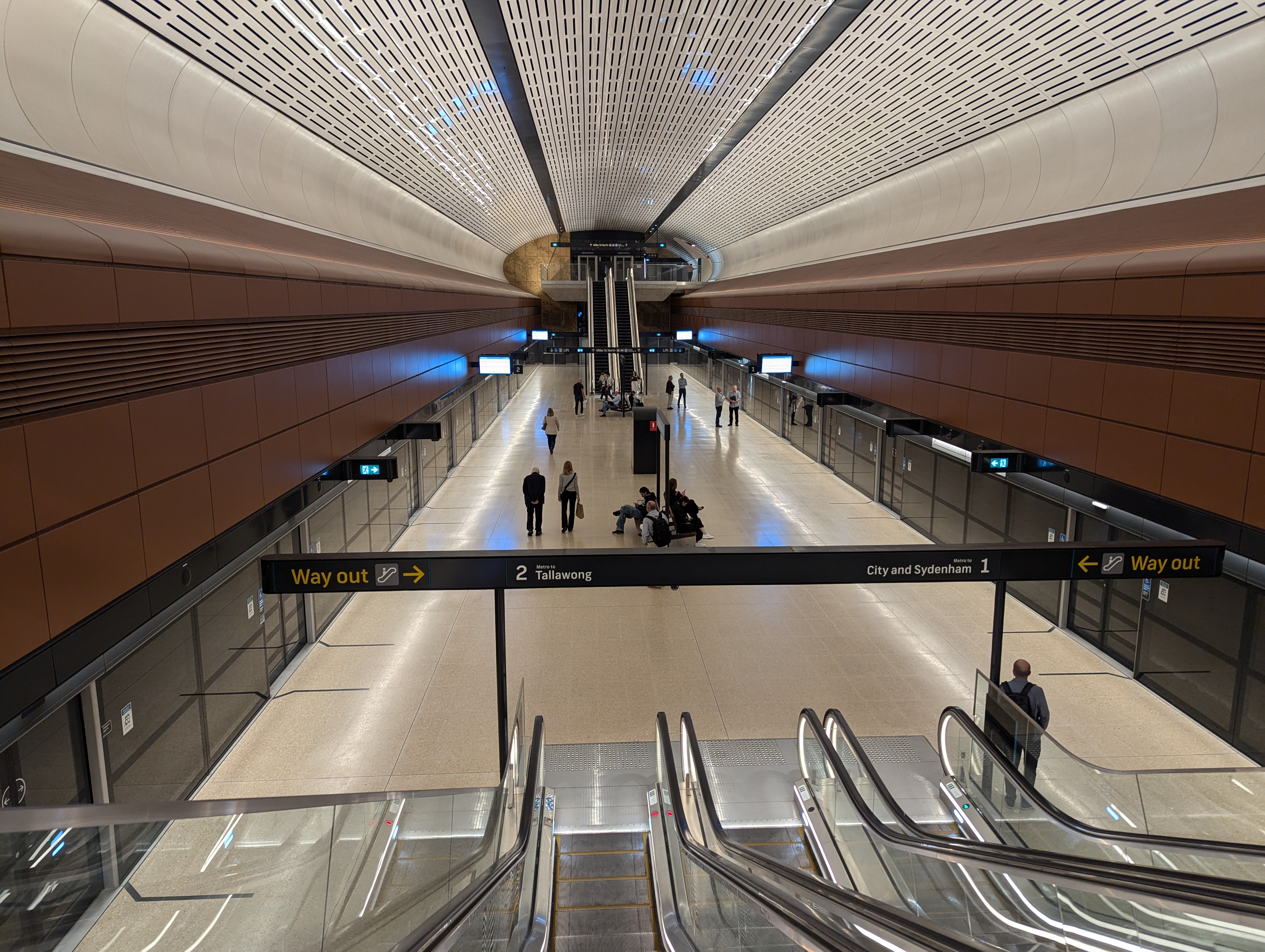
Platforms

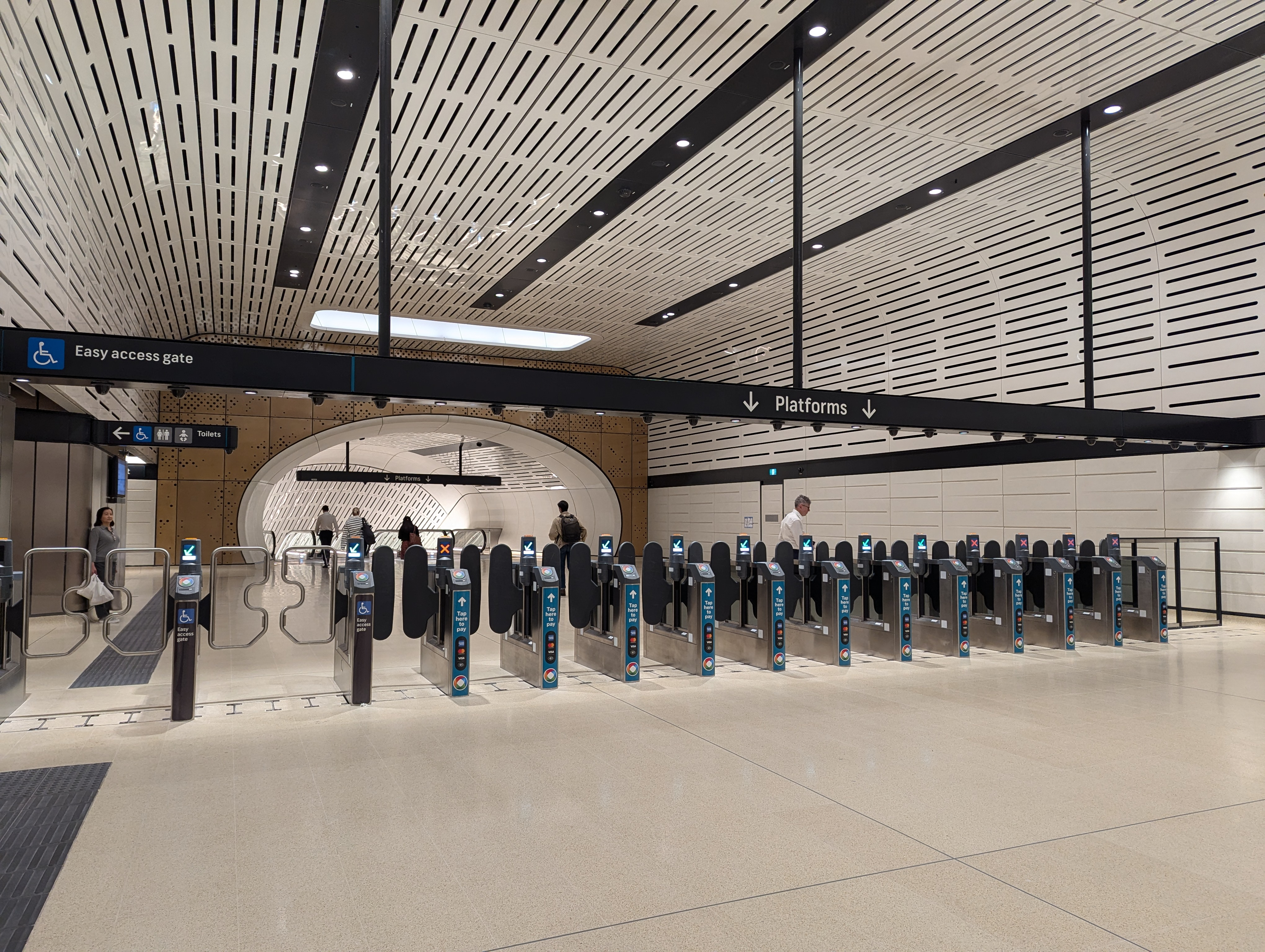
Concourse

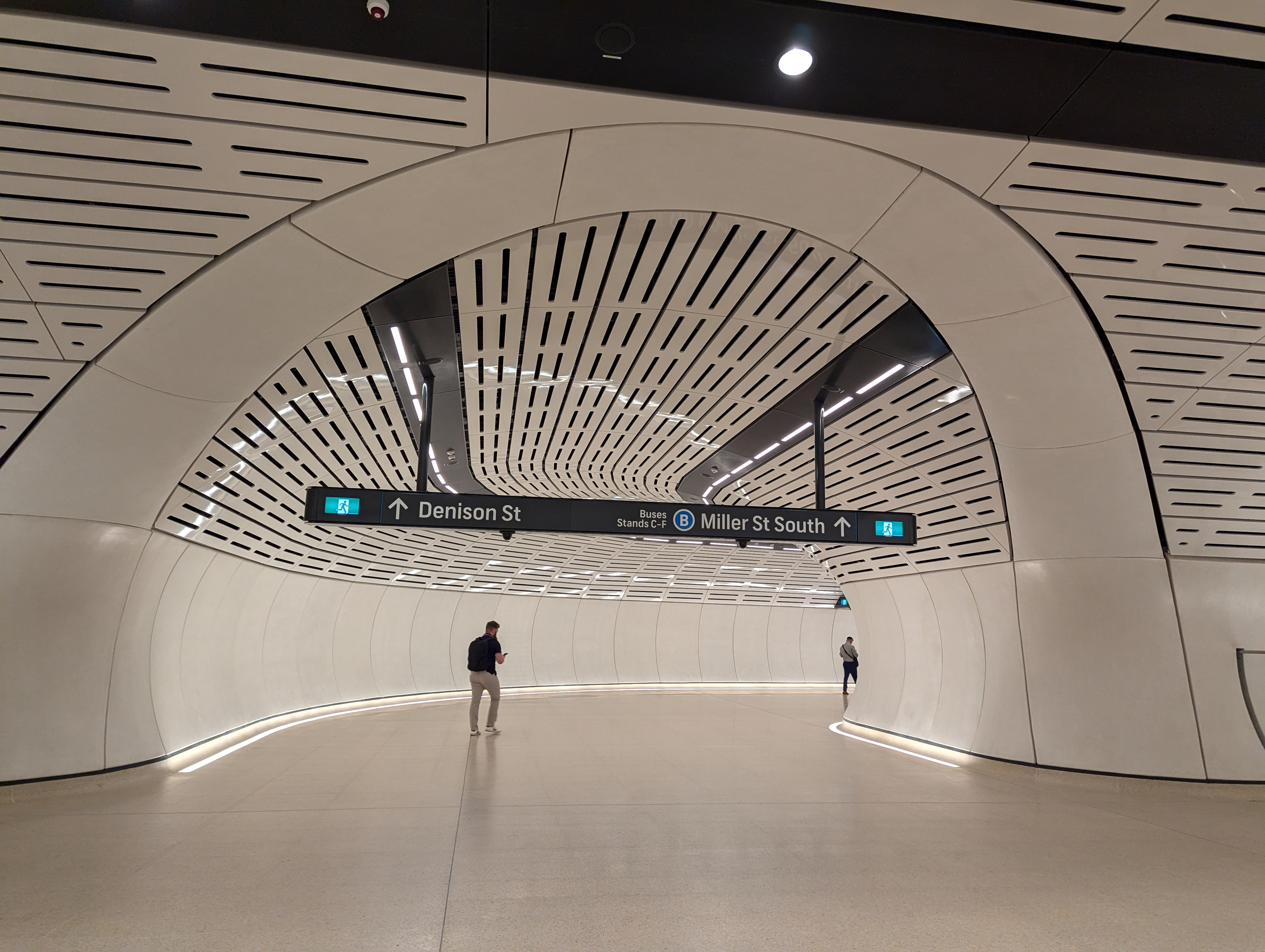
Walkway
