= Barangaroo metro station =

Sydney Metro station

Barangaroo
- Station entrance, Hickson Road, August 2026

General information
- Location: Hickson Road, Barangaroo; Australia
- Coordinates: 33°51′35″S 151°12′09″E
- Owner: Transport Asset Manager of New South Wales
- Operator: Metro Trains Sydney
- Line: Metro North West & Bankstown Line
- Distance: 3.5 km (2.2 mi) from Central
- Platforms: 2
- Tracks: 2
- Connections: Barangaroo; Bus; Wynyard

Construction
- Structure type: Underground
- Accessible: Yes

Other information
- Status: Open

History
- Opened: 19 August 2024

Passengers
- 2025: 5,078,226 (year); 13,912 (daily) (Sydney Metro)

Services
Preceding station	Sydney Metro	Following station
Victoria Cross towards Tallawong	M1 Metro North West & Bankstown Line	Martin Place towards Bankstown
Location
- Location of Barangaroo station

Barangaroo metro station is an underground Sydney Metro station in the Barangaroo precinct of Sydney, New South Wales, Australia. The station is served by the Metro North West & Bankstown Line.

== Description ==
Barangaroo station is located in the Barangaroo district of the Sydney central business district, beneath Hickson Road and south of Munn Street. The next station to the north is Victoria Cross and the next station to the south is Martin Place.

The northern entrance consists of separate buildings for the lifts and escalators, which connect down to the station concourse. The two buildings are on the west side of Hickson Road and were designed to be minimalist. The southern entrance will be designed and built in the future. On the east side of Hickson Road are nine service pods, which are used for ventilation and emergency egress.

== History ==
=== Excavation ===
The contract for the excavation of the six stations and twin 15.5-kilometre (9.6 mi) bored tunnels on the City & Southwest project was awarded to a joint venture between John Holland, CPB Contractors, and Ghella in June 2017, for A$2.81 billion. To reduce traffic congestion, the crushed rock excavated from the Barangaroo station site was taken away by barge on Sydney Harbour. A temporary facility was built in Clyde along the Parramatta River to receive the crushed rock and load it on trucks. The City & Southwest project involved two tunnels, which were bored using five tunnel boring machines (TBMs). Barangaroo station was the endpoint for the two TBMs that bored the 8.1-kilometre (5.0 mi) tunnels from Marrickville to Barangaroo. The station was also the start point for the TBM that bored the two 1 kilometre (0.62 mi) tunnels to Blues Point on the other side of Sydney Harbour. During excavation, several archaeological remains were found, including an old wharf from the 1890s and the wreck of a wooden boat built in the 1830s, which was the oldest boat of its kind discovered in New South Wales.

In February 2019, the pieces of the TBM used to bore under the Sydney Harbour, TBM Kathleen, arrived at Barangaroo station to be assembled. The machine was launched from a cavern north of Barangaroo station, which had been excavated to allow for a crossover to be built. TBM Kathleen began boring north in July 2019. The TBM reached Blues Point in December 2019, after which, the cutterhead and front end of the TBM was transported back to Barangaroo station by barge and the back end of the TBM was transported back via the tunnel.

Also in December 2019, Nancy, the first of the TBMs from Marrickville, broke through the southern end of Barangaroo station. The second TBM, Mum Shirl, reached Barangaroo station in January 2020. By that point, TBM Kathleen had begun boring the second tunnel between Barangaroo station and Blues Point. Each TBM was lifted out of the station box by a tower crane. By October 2021, station excavation was complete and the site was handed over to the station construction contractor.

=== Station construction ===
Following expressions of interest, three companies were shortlisted for the station construction contract by the end of 2019: Hutchinson Builders, John Holland, and Besix Watpac. In March 2021, Besix Watpac was awarded the $217 million contract. By April 2022, the station platform had been installed. It was made of 195 precast concrete pieces. The first four out of ten escalators, which were 25 metres (82 ft) long, had also been installed. By October 2022, two out of the five lifts had been put in place and the installation of platform screen doors was underway, which was completed by April 2023. All ten escalators and five lifts were complete and undergoing testing by November 2023. Other, more minor components were also complete by November 2023, including the terrazzo tiling, station signage, Opal fare gates, and sandstone wall panels.

The station opened on 19 August 2024.

== Services ==
Barangaroo station is served by the Metro North West & Bankstown Line. This line is operated under contract by Metro Trains Sydney. Upon opening, the Metro North West & Bankstown Line will run between Tallawong station to the north-west and Bankstown station to the south-west.

The Metro North West & Bankstown Line currently operates at a four-minute headway during peak and a ten-minute headway outside of peak.

Platform	Line	Stopping pattern	Notes
1	M1 Metro North West & Bankstown Line	Services to Sydenham	
2	M1 Metro North West & Bankstown Line	Services to Tallawong	

== Gallery ==
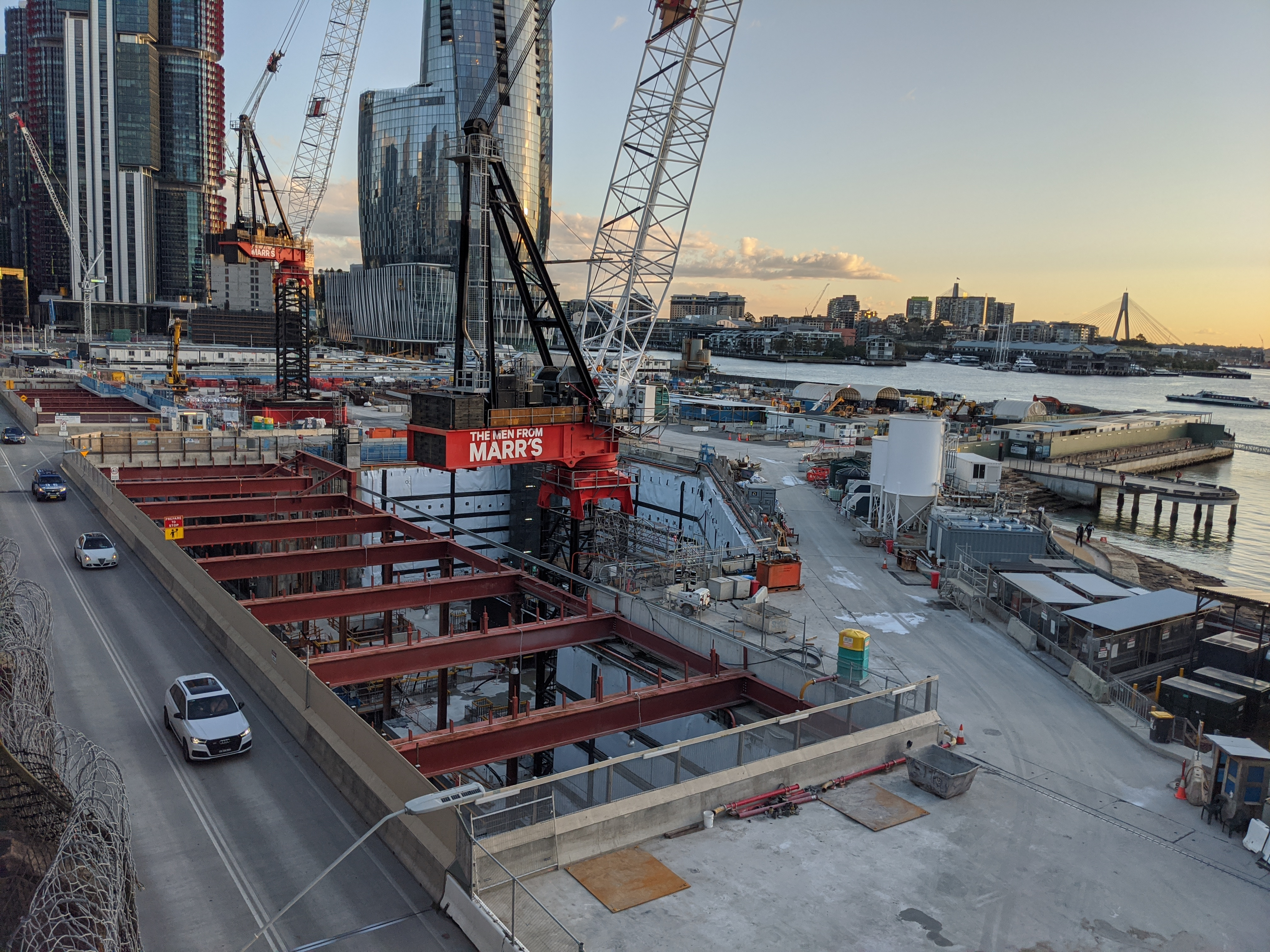
Station box under construction, 2020

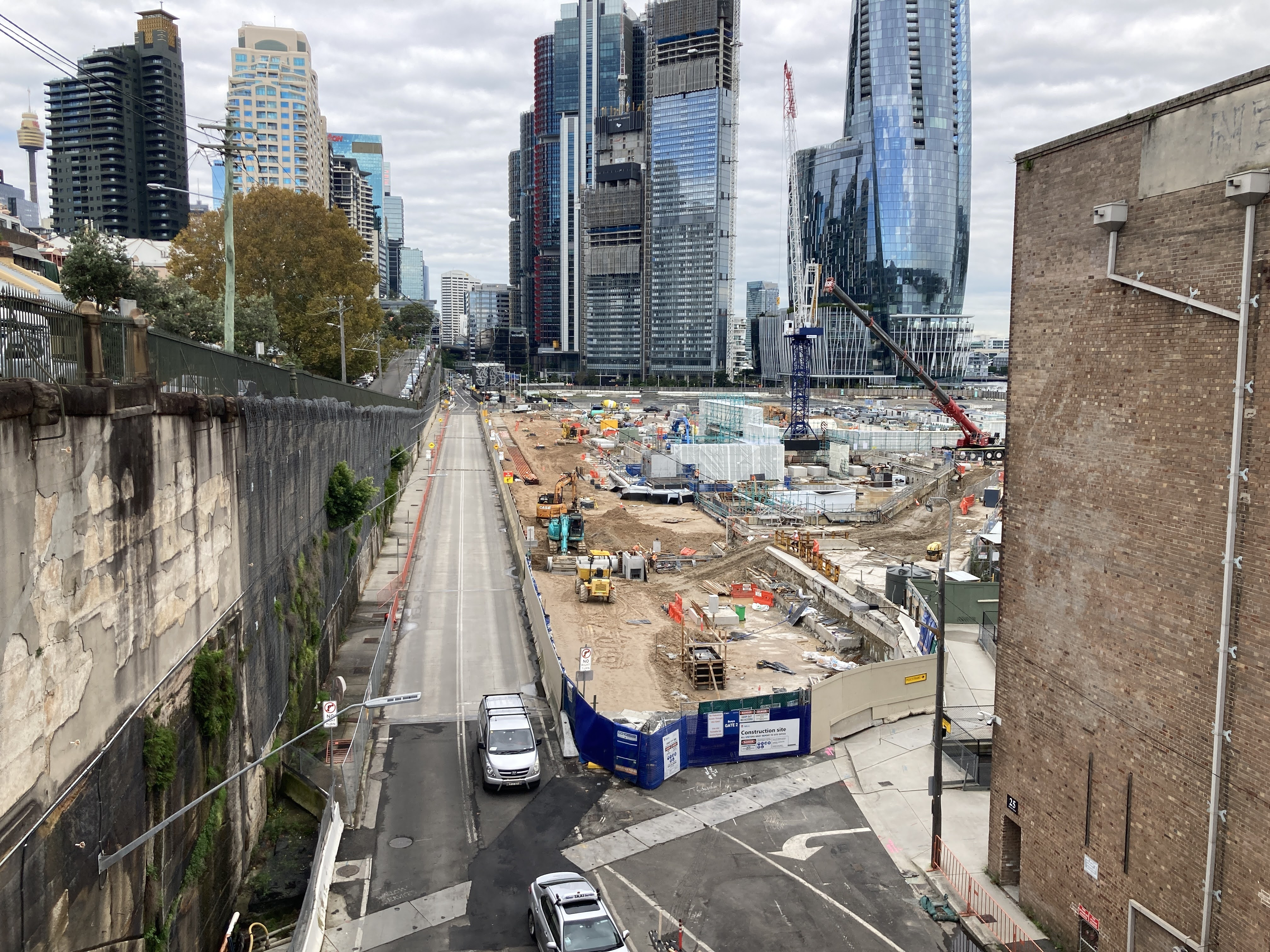
Construction in April 2022

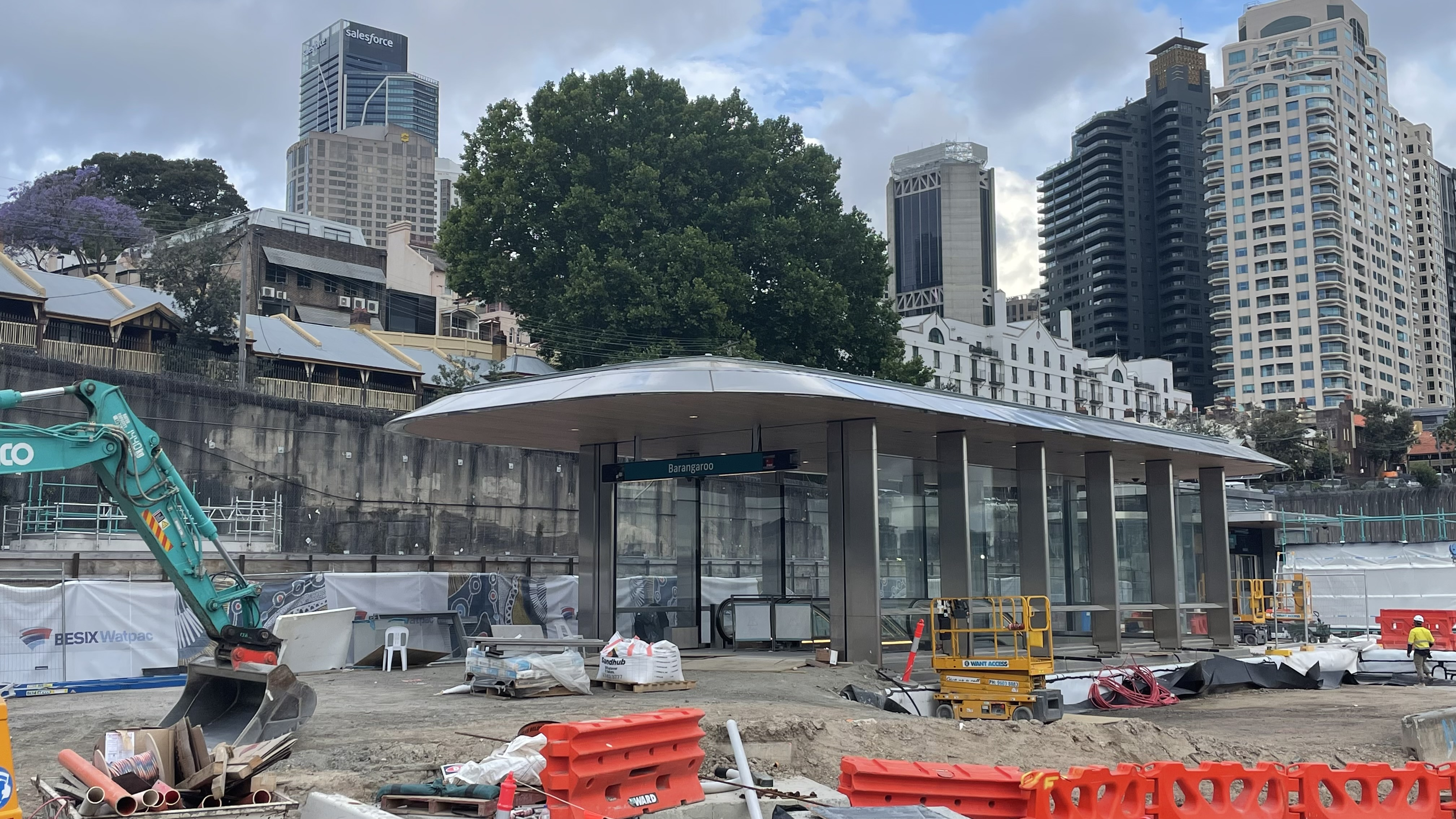
Entrance under construction, November 2023

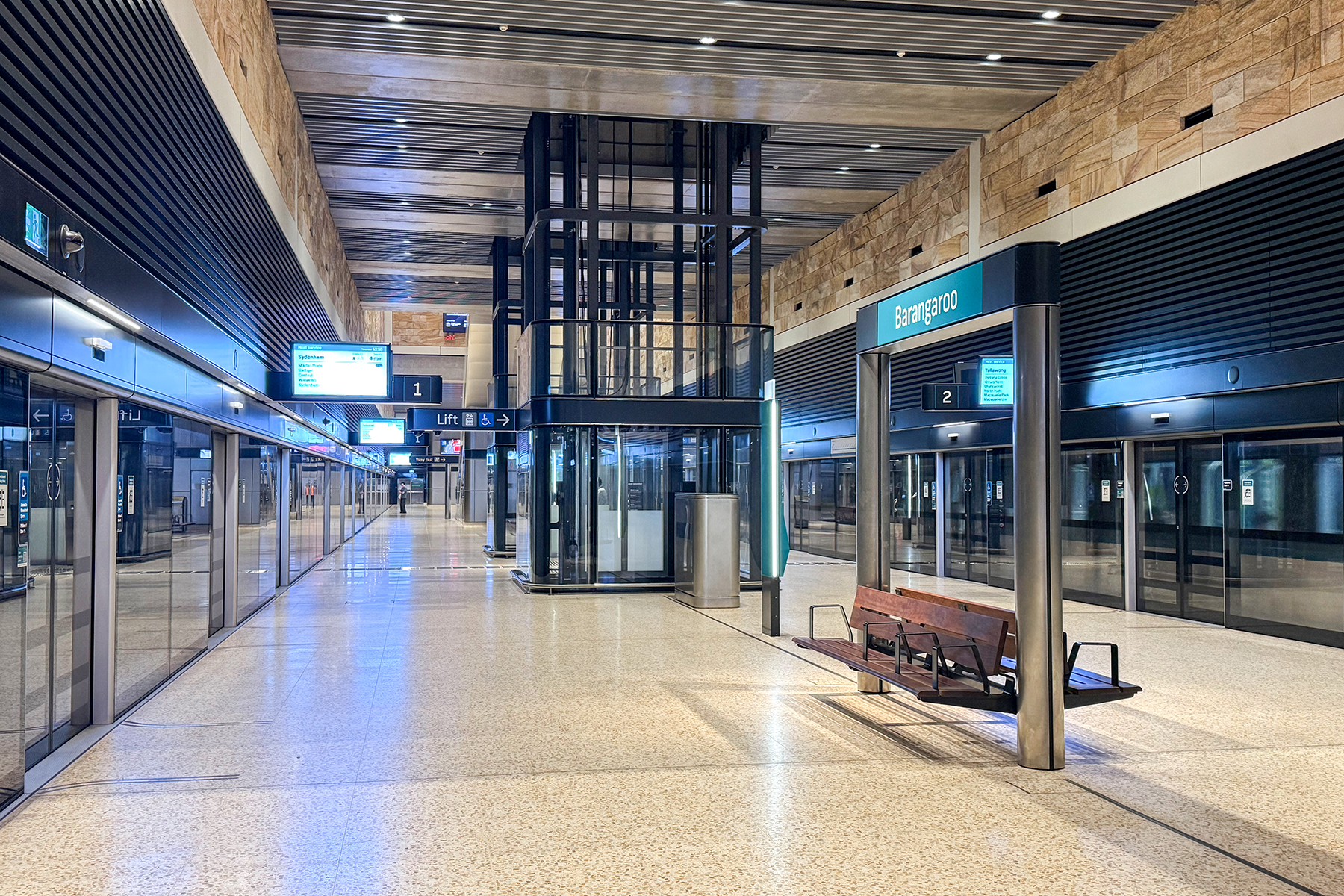
Platforms 1 & 2

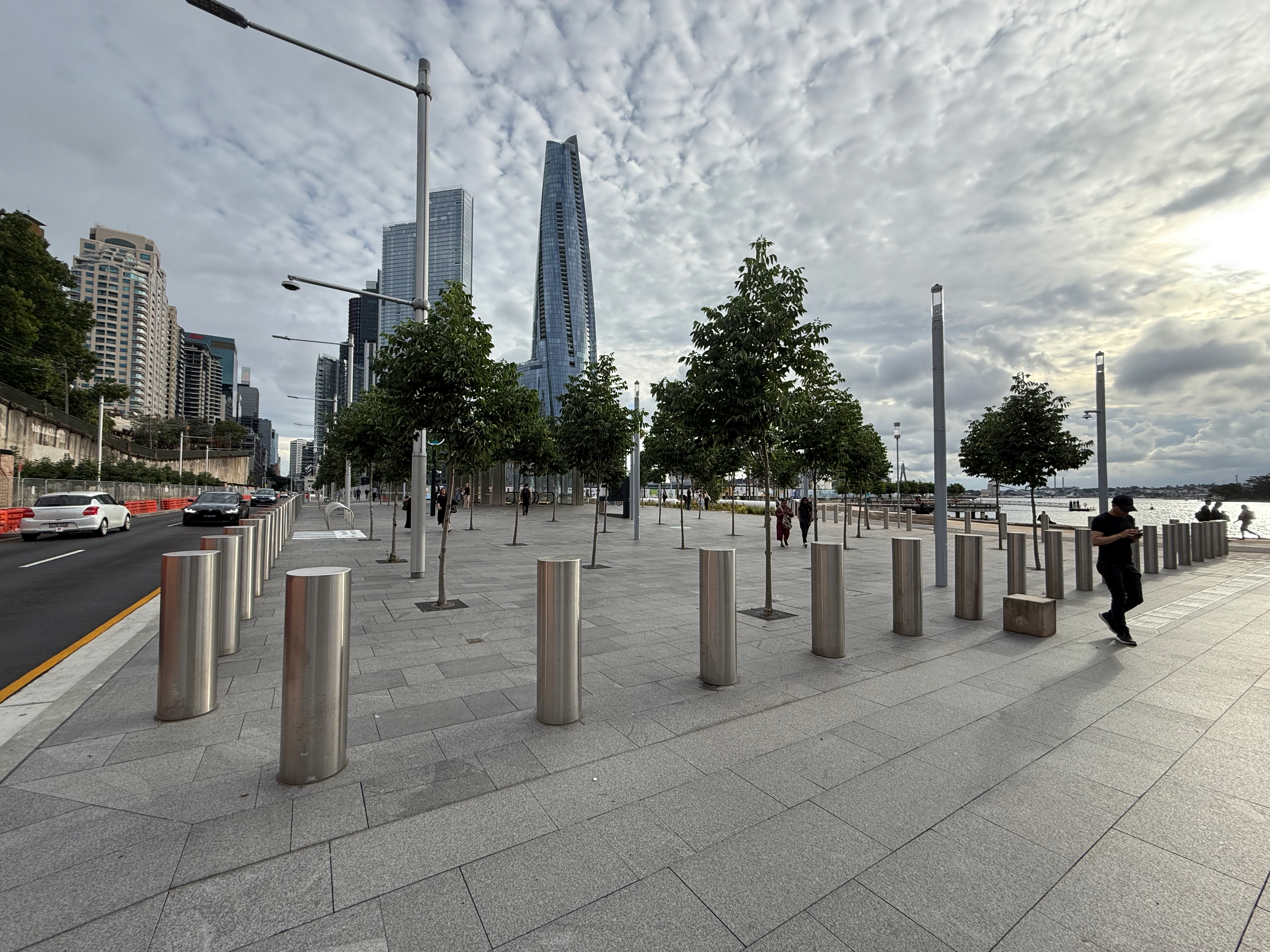
Station plaza to the north of the entrance, 2024
