= Crows Nest metro station =

Metro station in Sydney, Australia

Crows Nest
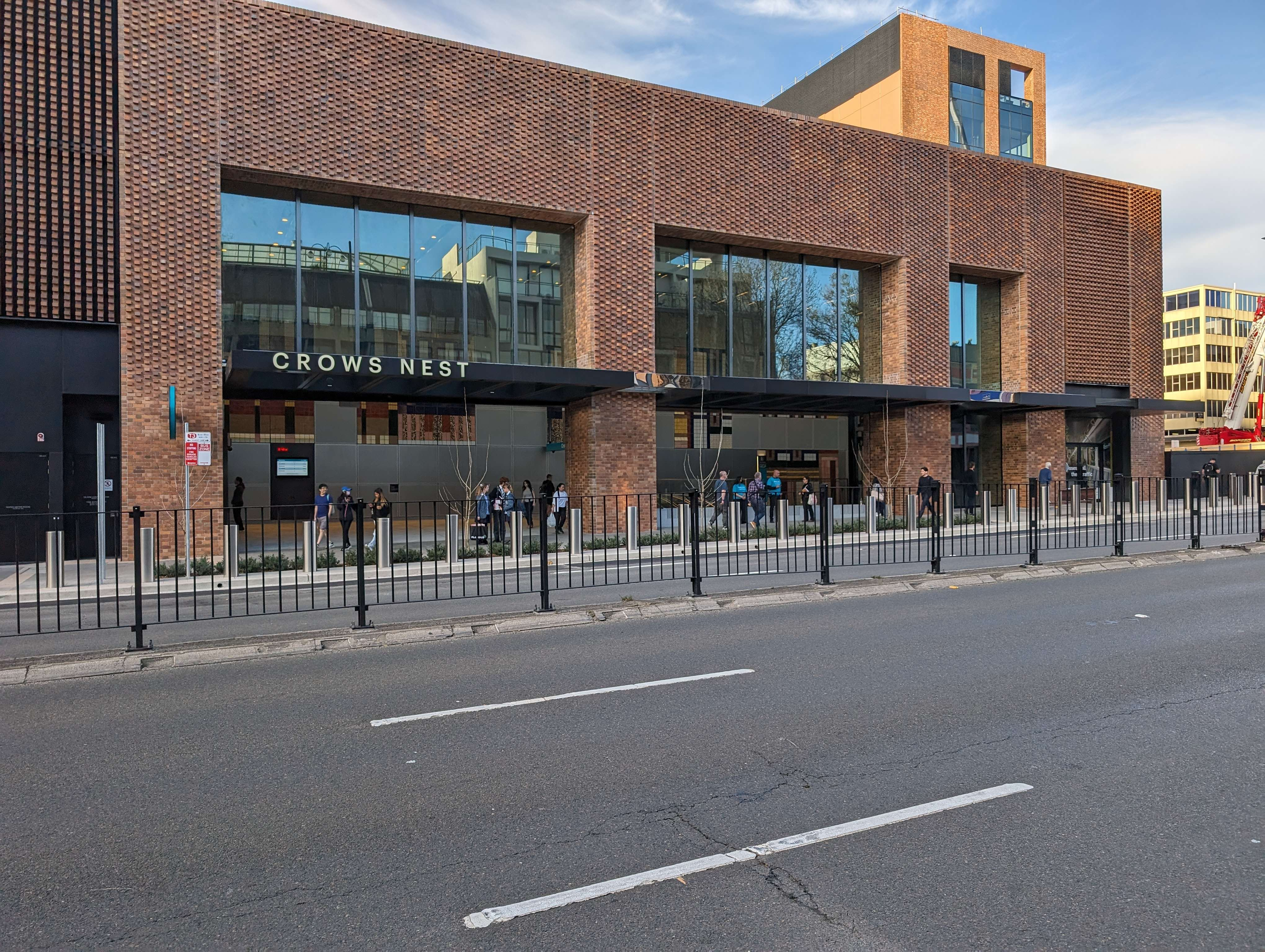
- Station entrance from Pacific Highway, August 2024

General information
- Location: Pacific Highway, Crows Nest; Australia
- Coordinates: 33.8254061°S 151.1989687°E
- Owner: New South Wales Government via Transport Asset Manager of New South Wales
- Operator: Metro Trains Sydney
- Line: Metro North West & Bankstown Line
- Distance: 7.70 km (4.78 mi) from Central
- Platforms: 2
- Tracks: 2
- Connections: St Leonards; Bus

Construction
- Structure type: Underground
- Depth: 25 m (82 ft)
- Cycle facilities: Yes
- Accessible: Yes

Other information
- Status: Open

History
- Opened: 19 August 2024

Services
Preceding station	Sydney Metro	Following station
Chatswood towards Tallawong	M1 Metro North West & Bankstown Line	Victoria Cross towards Bankstown
Location

Crows Nest railway station is an underground Sydney Metro station in Crows Nest, New South Wales, Australia. It is served by the Metro North West & Bankstown Line and opened on 19 August 2024. The station is near the existing St Leonards station on the North Shore Line.

Access is provided via Clarke Street and the Pacific Highway. The station is located 25 metres underground. Crows Nest railway station was constructed by AW Edwards. The design includes nine escalators and five lifts.

== History ==
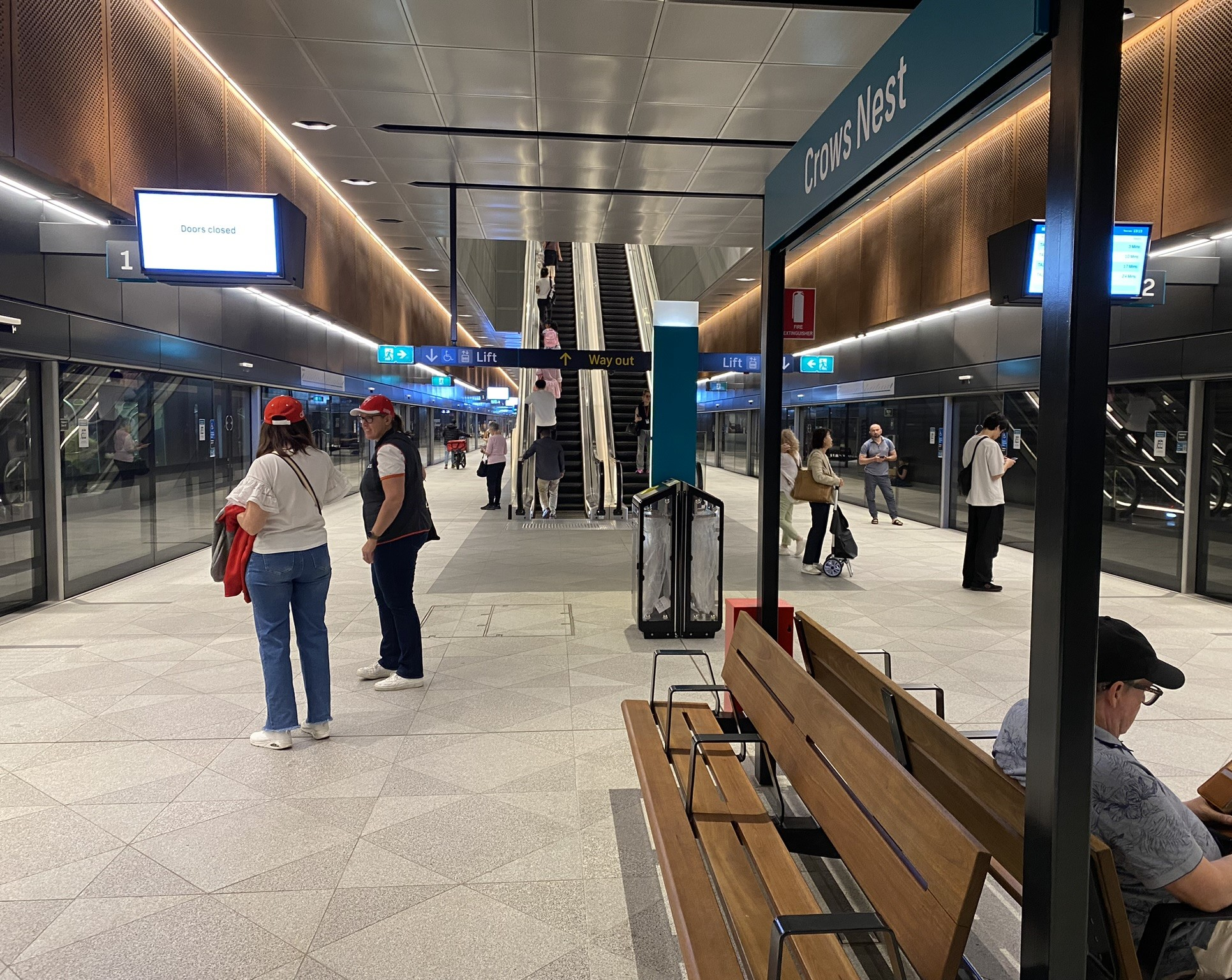
Platform, September 2024

In 2021, plans were released for three buildings of up to 21, 17 and nine storeys to be built above the station. The approved buildings are slightly smaller in scale than the initial proposal, in response to residents' concerns about overdevelopment.

The station opened on 19 August 2024.

== Platforms and services ==
Platform	Line	Stopping pattern	Notes
1	M1 Metro North West & Bankstown Line	Services to Bankstown	
2	M1 Metro North West & Bankstown Line	Services to Tallawong	
