= Birrong =

- Suburb
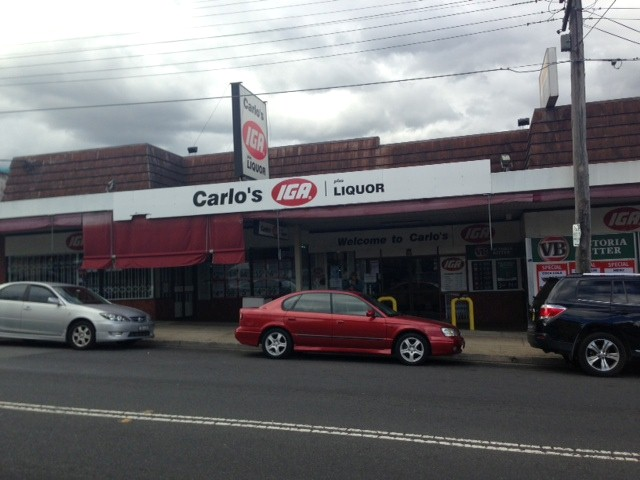
- Auburn Road, Birrong

- Interactive map of Birrong
- Country: Australia
- State: New South Wales
- City: Sydney
- LGA: City of Canterbury-Bankstown
- Location: 22 km (14 mi) south-west of Sydney CBD

Government
  - State electorate: Bankstown
  - Federal division: Blaxland
- Elevation: 40 m (130 ft)

Population
  - Total: 3,331 (2021 census)
- Postcode: 2143
Suburbs around Birrong
Sefton	Regents Park	Regents Park
Sefton	Birrong	Potts Hill
Yagoona	Yagoona	Potts Hill

Birrong is a suburb in South-western Sydney in the state of New South Wales, Australia. It is part of the local government area of City of Canterbury-Bankstown, and is located 22 kilometres south-west of the Sydney central business district.

Birrong shares its postcode of 2143 with neighbouring suburbs Regents Park and Potts Hill.

== Landmarks ==
Birrong features a large number of community facilities such as six soccer/rugby league fields, tennis courts, a large natural park reserve, a bowls club, and a swimming pool. Birrong also has two high schools, Birrong Boys High School and Birrong Girls High School, and a primary school. A small group of shops is located on Auburn Road, featuring a barber, bakery, cafes, takeaway restaurants, IGA (including bottle shop and butcher), and hair salon.

== History ==
The Aboriginal word Birrong, meaning star, was adopted as the suburb's name around 1927.

One of the first settlers of Birrong was Joseph Hyde Potts who was granted land in the area in 1835 and has Potts Hill named after him. Development in the area of Birrong increased with the opening of the railway in 1928. Birrong Park, an area that was subject to flooding, was drained as relief work during the Great Depression (1929–1934). The post office opened in 1955.

== Demographics ==
In the 2021 census, the population of Birrong was 3,331.

The median age of the Birrong population was 36 years, less than the national median of 38.

47.5% of people were born in Australia. The most common countries of birth were Vietnam 15.7%, China 5.9% and Lebanon 4.4%.

29.2% of people only spoke English at home. Other languages spoken at home included Vietnamese 19.8%, Arabic 18.4%, Mandarin 7.4% and Cantonese 4.4%.

The religious make up of Birrong was Islam 24.9%, Catholic 19.8%, No Religion 18.5% and Buddhism 13.1%.

== Education ==
Birrong Girls High School is a public girls high school that was established as a girls' comprehensive high school in 1957. There are 820 students (2006 estimate) from a wide variety of cultural backgrounds enrolled in the school. 84% of students are from non-English speaking background (NESB) which represents 46 language groups.

== Transport ==
Birrong railway station is located on the Bankstown railway line, and is serviced by Lidcombe & Bankstown Line services operated by Sydney Trains. Birrong is also serviced by a bus network run by Transit Systems.
