= Bankstown line =

Bankstown line may refer to:

- Bankstown railway line, a physical railway line in Sydney, Australia
- M1 Metro North West & Bankstown Line, a Sydney Metro service which partially operates on the Bankstown railway line
- T6 Lidcombe & Bankstown Line, a Sydney Trains service which partially operates on the Bankstown railway line
