= Yagoona railway station =

Railway station in Sydney, New South Wales, Australia

Yagoona
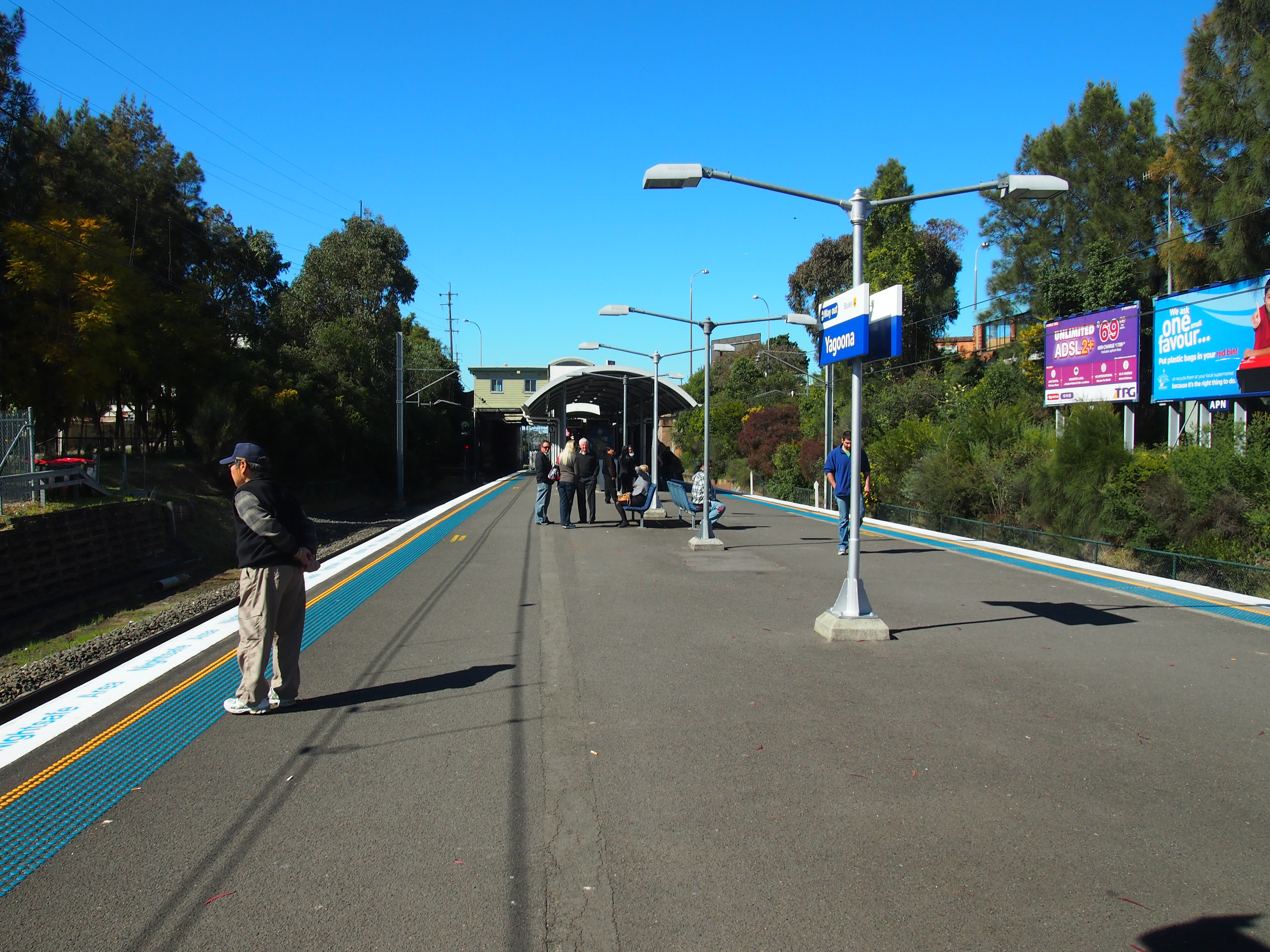
- Southbound view from Platform 2 in September 2012

General information
- Location: Hume Highway, Yagoona; Sydney, New South Wales; Australia
- Coordinates: 33°54′24″S 151°01′27″E
- Elevation: 42 metres (138 ft)
- Owner: Transport Asset Manager of NSW
- Operator: Sydney Trains
- Line: Bankstown
- Distance: 20.56 km (12.78 mi) from Central
- Platforms: 2 (1 island)
- Tracks: 2
- Connections: Bus

Construction
- Structure type: Ground
- Accessible: Yes

Other information
- Status: Weekdays: Staffed: 6am to 7pm: Weekends and public holidays: Staffed: 8am to 4pm
- Station code: YOA
- Website: Transport for NSW

History
- Opened: 16 July 1928 (98 years ago)
- Electrified: Yes (from July 1939)

Passengers
- 2023: 661,490 (year); 1,812 (daily) (Sydney Trains, NSW TrainLink)

Services
Preceding station	Sydney Trains	Following station
Birrong towards Lidcombe	Lidcombe & Bankstown Line	Bankstown Terminus
Former services
Preceding station	Sydney Trains	Following station
Birrong towards Lidcombe or Liverpool	Bankstown Line (until 2024)	Bankstown towards City Circle
Location

Yagoona railway station is a suburban railway station located on the Bankstown line, serving the Sydney suburb of Yagoona. It is served by Sydney Trains T6 Lidcombe & Bankstown Line services.

== History ==
Yagoona station opened on 16 July 1928, when the Bankstown line was extended from Bankstown to Regents Park.

In 2018, the NSW Government considered extending the Sydney Metro Southwest line north beyond Bankstown to Yagoona as the terminal. However, due to NSW Government budgetary constraints, a lack of community support, and the future extension of the Metro line west from Bankstown to Liverpool using a new rail corridor, the proposed Yagoona Metro terminal was abandoned.

In 2020, following the NSW Legislative Council Inquiry into Sydenham to Bankstown line conversion's review of Transport for NSW plans to close stations in the west of Bankstown, the NSW Government announced a Bankstown to Lidcombe shuttle service would operate in the short-term through Yagoona once Sydney Metro Southwest opened in 2024.

The station received an upgrade under the Transport Access Program that was completed in August 2022. This included replacing the station building, concourse, lift and stairs. The new lift was the first hands free lift on the Sydney rail network.

== Services ==
=== Platforms ===
Platform	Line	Stopping pattern	Notes
1	Lidcombe & Bankstown Line	services to Bankstown	
2	Lidcombe & Bankstown Line	services to Lidcombe	

=== Transport links ===
Transit Systems NSW operates two bus routes via Yagoona station, under contract to Transport for NSW:

- 907: Bankstown station to Parramatta station
- M91: Parramatta station to Hurstville
