= Birrong railway station =

Railway station in Sydney, New South Wales, Australia

Birrong
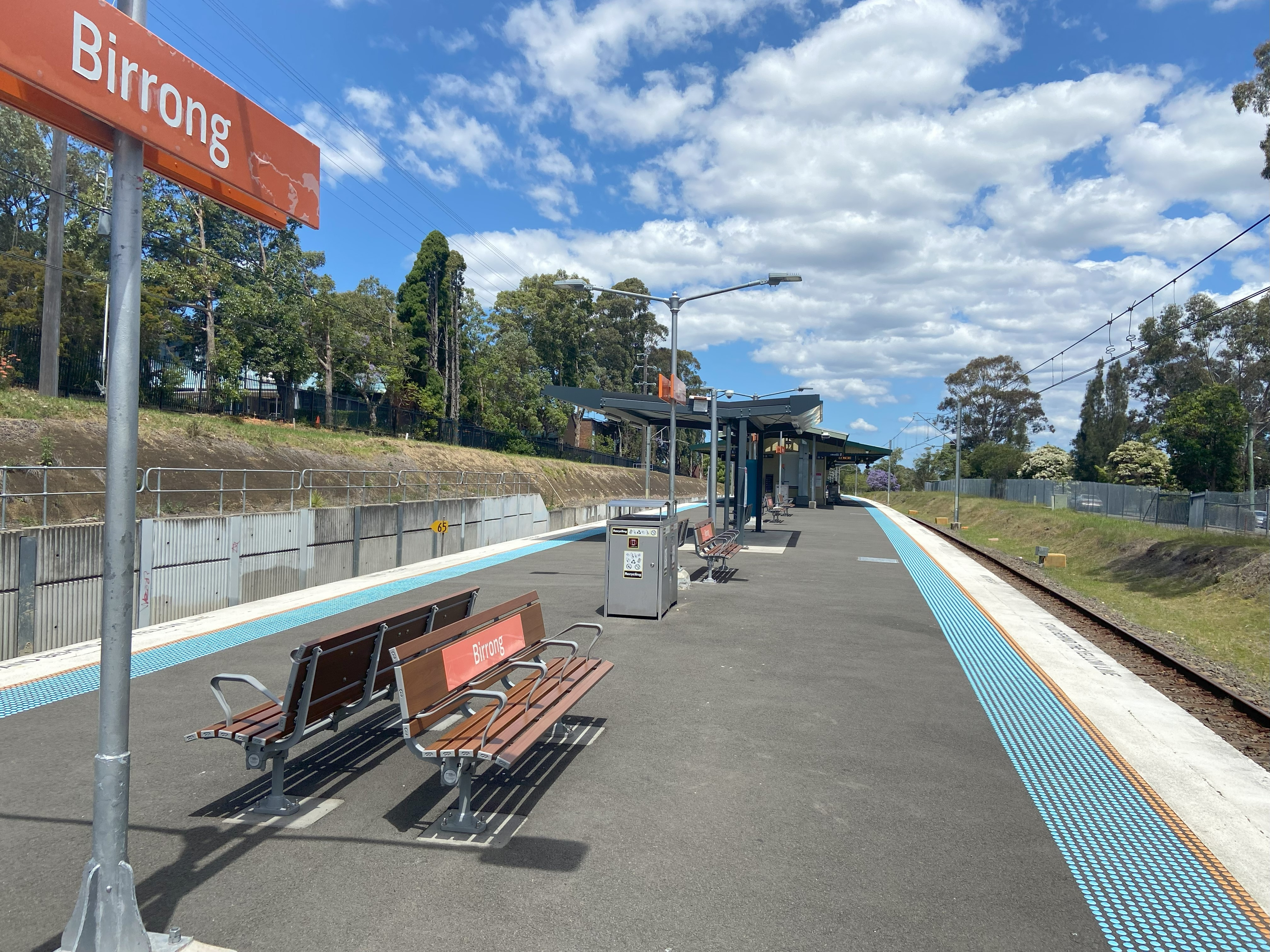
- Southbound view of the station from Platform 2 in October 2024

General information
- Location: Rodd Street, Birrong; Sydney, New South Wales; Australia
- Coordinates: 33°53′36″S 151°01′26″E
- Elevation: 43 metres (141 ft)
- Owner: Transport Asset Manager of NSW
- Operator: Sydney Trains
- Line: Bankstown
- Distance: 22.11 km (13.74 mi) from Central
- Platforms: 2 (1 island)
- Tracks: 2

Construction
- Structure type: Ground
- Accessible: Yes

Other information
- Status: Weekdays: Staffed: 6am to 7pm: Weekends and public holidays: Unstaffed
- Station code: BIO
- Website: Transport for NSW

History
- Opened: 16 July 1928 (98 years ago)
- Electrified: Yes (from July 1939)

Passengers
- 2025: 175,362 (year); 480 (daily) (Sydney Trains)
- Rank: 195

Services
Preceding station	Sydney Trains	Following station
Regents Park towards Lidcombe	Lidcombe & Bankstown Line	Yagoona towards Bankstown
Former services
Preceding station	Sydney Trains	Following station
Regents Park towards Lidcombe	Bankstown Line (until 2024)	Yagoona towards City Circle
Sefton towards Liverpool	Bankstown Line (until 2024)	Yagoona towards City Circle
Location

Birrong railway station is a suburban railway station located on the Bankstown line, serving the Sydney suburb of Birrong. It is served by Sydney Trains T6 Lidcombe & Bankstown Line services.

== History ==
Birrong station opened on 16 July 1928, when the Bankstown line was extended from Bankstown to Regents Park. To the north of the station lies Sefton Park Junction with services heading north to Lidcombe and west to Liverpool on the Main South line. The Bankstown-Lidcombe line also passes over the Southern Sydney Freight Line.

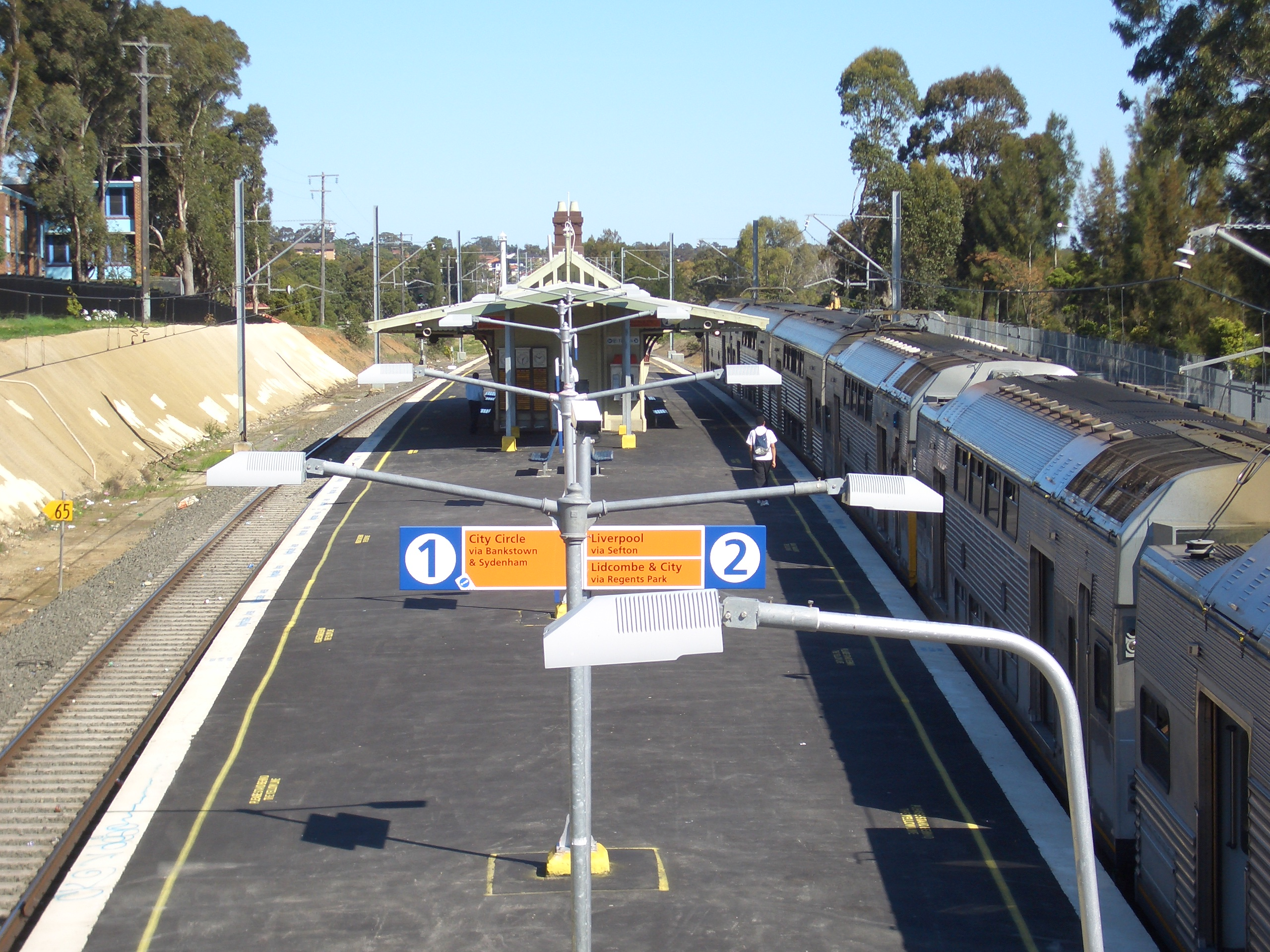
View from the station stairs in August 2007, during the CityRail era.

In 2020, following the NSW Legislative Council Inquiry into Sydenham to Bankstown line conversion's review of Transport for NSW plans to close stations in the west of Bankstown, the NSW Government announced a Bankstown to Lidcombe shuttle service would operate in the short-term through Birrong once Sydney Metro Southwest opened in 2024.

In July 2021 an upgrade to the station was completed with a new lift and staircase.

Birrong is the only station in Sydney with a pre-WWII style station building that is not heritage-listed.

== Services ==
=== Platforms ===
Platform	Line	Stopping pattern	Notes
1	T6	services to Bankstown	
2	T6	services to Lidcombe	

== Trackplan ==
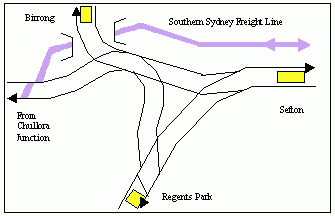
Birrong station lies at one vertex of a railway triangle
