= List of Sydney Trains railway stations =

Sydney Trains is the operator of suburban and intercity rail services centred on the Sydney rail network. Sydney Trains is owned and operated by Transport for NSW, a statutory authority of the Government of New South Wales.

The Sydney Trains suburban network comprises nine lines with services extending as far as Bondi Junction to the east, Berowra to the north, Richmond to the northwest, Emu Plains to the west, Macarthur to the southwest, and Waterfall to the south with some peak hour services continuing to Helensburgh.

Most of the Sydney Trains suburban network lies on the surface, though lines within and around the Sydney CBD run underground. The network is served by a fleet of double-deck electric multiple units.

== List of stations ==
List of stations
Station	Code	Image	Suburban services	Railway line(s)	Distance from Central station (km)	Opened	Previous name(s)	Transfers
Allawah	ALW	Allawah	Eastern Suburbs & Illawarra Line	Illawarra	13.690	25 October 1925		
Arncliffe	ARN	Arncliffe	Eastern Suburbs & Illawarra Line	Illawarra	8.420	15 October 1884		
Artarmon	ATM	Artarmon	North Shore & Western Line Northern Line (Sydney)	North Shore	10.300	6 July 1898 (original site), 7 October 1900 (present site)		
Ashfield	ASH	Ashfield	Leppington & Inner West Line Liverpool & Inner West Line	Main Suburban	8.380	26 September 1855		
Asquith	ASQ	Asquith	North Shore & Western Line	Main Northern	35.690	1 November 1915		
Auburn	AUB	Auburn	North Shore & Western Line Leppington & Inner West Line	Main Suburban	18.630	18 February 1877		
Banksia	BKS	Banksia	Eastern Suburbs & Illawarra Line	Illawarra	9.600	21 October 1906		
Bankstown	BNK	Bankstown	Lidcombe & Bankstown Line	Bankstown	18.720	14 April 1909		Metro
Bardwell Park	BPK	Bardwell	Airport & South Line	East Hills	10.100	21 September 1931		
Beecroft	BCF	Beecroft	Northern Line (Sydney)	Main Northern	26.900	17 September 1886 (original site); 7 March 1892 (present site)		
Berala	BEJ	Berala	Liverpool & Inner West Line Lidcombe & Bankstown Line	Main South	18.360	11 November 1912		
Berowra	BEW	Berowra	North Shore & Western Line	Main Northern	44.660	7 April 1887		Intercity Trains
Beverly Hills	BVH	Beverly Hills	Airport & South Line	East Hills	14.650	21 September 1931	Dumbleton (1931–1940)	
Bexley North	BXN	Bexley North	Airport & South Line	East Hills	11.370	21 September 1931		
Birrong	BIO	Birrong	Lidcombe & Bankstown Line	Bankstown	22.110	16 July 1928		
Blacktown	BAK	Blacktown	North Shore & Western Line Cumberland Line	Main Western; Richmond	34.870	4 July 1860	Blacktown Road (1860–1862)	Interchange; Intercity Trains
Bondi Junction	BJN	Bondi Junction	Eastern Suburbs & Illawarra Line	Eastern Suburbs	6.760	23 June 1979		
Burwood	BUW	Burwood	Leppington & Inner West Line Liverpool & Inner West Line Northern Line (Sydney)	Main Suburban	10.620	26 September 1855 (original site); 13 March 1892 (present site)		
Cabramatta	CAB	Cabramatta	Leppington & Inner West Line Liverpool & Inner West Line Cumberland Line	Main South	28.430	1870		
Campbelltown	CTN	Campbelltown	Airport & South Line	Main South	54.710	17 May 1858		Major Interchange; Intercity Trains; Buses
Canley Vale	CVE	Canley Vale	Leppington & Inner West Line Cumberland Line	Old Main South	30.980	15 April 1878		
Caringbah	CIH	Caringbah	Eastern Suburbs & Illawarra Line	Cronulla	31.510	16 December 1939		
Carlton	CLJ	Carlton	Eastern Suburbs & Illawarra Line	Illawarra	12.740	15 February 1887		
Carramar	CRR	Carramar	Liverpool & Inner West Line	Main South	25.890	8 October 1924	South Fairfield (1924–1926)	
Casula	CSL	Casula	Leppington & Inner West Line Cumberland Line	Main South	38.800	1 November 1894		
Central	CEN	Central	North Shore & Western Line Leppington & Inner West Line Liverpool & Inner West Line Eastern Suburbs & Illawarra Line Olympic Park Line Airport & South Line Northern Line (Sydney)	Main Suburban; North Shore; Illawarra	0.00	26 September 1855 (original site); 5 August 1906 (present site); 3 October 1926 (electric platforms); 23 June 1979 (underground platforms)	Sydney (1855–1926)	Major interchange Metro; Intercity, interstate and long distance trains Buses; Coaches; Light Rail; Indian Pacific
Chatswood	CWD	Chatswood	North Shore & Western Line	North Shore	11.650	1 January 1890		Major Interchange; Metro; Buses
Cheltenham	CHA	Cheltenham	Northern Line (Sydney)	Main Northern	25.380	10 October 1898		
Chester Hill	CHH	Chester Hill	Liverpool & Inner West Line	Main South	22.310	8 October 1924		
Circular Quay	CQY	Circular Quay	Leppington & Inner West Line Liverpool & Inner West Line Airport & South Line	City Circle	2.970	22 January 1956		Major Interchange; Buses; Ferries; Light Rail
Clarendon	CRD	Clarendon	North Shore & Western Line Cumberland Line	Richmond	57.210	1870	Hawkesbury Racecourse (1870–1876)	
Clyde	CYE	Clyde	North Shore & Western Line Leppington & Inner West Line	Main Suburban	20.660	1882	Rosehill Junction (1882–1883); Clyde (1883–1901); Clyde Junction (1901–1904)	
Como	CMO	Como	Eastern Suburbs & Illawarra Line	Illawarra	21.240	26 December 1885 (original site); 27 November 1972 (present site)		
Concord West	CDW	Concord West	Northern Line (Sydney)	Main Northern	14.540	1 September 1887	Concord (1887–1909)	
Cronulla	CNL	Cronulla	Eastern Suburbs & Illawarra Line	Cronulla	34.810	16 December 1939		Buses
Croydon	CYD	Croydon	Leppington & Inner West Line Liverpool & Inner West Line	Main Suburban	9.420	7 January 1875	Five Dock (1875–1876)	
Denistone	DST	Denistone	Northern Line (Sydney)	Main Northern	20.160	26 September 1937		
Domestic Airport	DOM	Domestic	Airport & South Line	Airport	6.600	21 May 2000		Buses
Doonside	DOD	Doonside	North Shore & Western Line	Main Western	38.290	27 September 1880	Doonside (1880–1921); Wolkara (1921)	
East Hills	EHS	East Hills	Airport & South Line	East Hills	24.030	21 December 1931		
East Richmond	ERD	East Richmond	North Shore & Western Line Cumberland Line	Richmond	60.000	2 July 1939		
Eastwood	EWD	Eastwood	Northern Line (Sydney)	Main Northern	21.390	17 September 1886	Dundas (1886–1887)	
Edgecliff	ECL	Edgecliff	Eastern Suburbs & Illawarra Line	Eastern Suburbs	4.820	23 June 1979		Buses
Edmondson Park	EDP	Edmondson Park	Leppington & Inner West Line Cumberland Line	South West	43.16	8 February 2015		
Emu Plains	EPS	Emu Plains	North Shore & Western Line	Main Western	57.440	18 August 1868 (original site); 1884 (present site)		Intercity Trains
Engadine	EGD	Engadine	Eastern Suburbs & Illawarra Line	Illawarra	30.750	1 October 1920		
Epping	EPG	Epping	Northern Line (Sydney)	Main Northern; Epping to Chatswood	23.390	17 September 1886 (original site); 15 February 1900 (present site); 23 February 2009 (underground platforms)	Field of Mars (1886–1887); Carlingford (1887–1899)	Interchange; Metro; Intercity Trains
Erskineville	EKV	Erskinevelle	Airport & South Line	Illawarra	2.880	15 October 1884 (original site); 16 June 1912 (present site)		
Fairfield	FFL	Fairfield	Leppington & Inner West Line Cumberland Line	Old Main South	28.997	26 September 1856		
Flemington	FMG	Flemington	Leppington & Inner West Line Liverpool & Inner West Line	Main Suburban	14.332	1884		
Glenfield	GFD	Glenfield	Leppington & Inner West Line Cumberland Line Airport & South Line	Main South	41.930	6 September 1869 (original site); 27 March 1891 (present site)		Interchange; Intercity Trains; Buses
Gordon	GDN	Gordon	North Shore & Western Line Northern Line (Sydney)	North Shore	17.120	1 January 1890		
Granville	GAV	Granville	North Shore & Western Line Leppington & Inner West Line	Main Suburban	21.220	2 July 1860	Parramatta Junction (1860–1880)	Major Interchange; Buses
Green Square	GQE	Green Square	Airport & South Line	Airport	2.600	21 May 2000		
Guildford	GUD	Guildford	Leppington & Inner West Line Cumberland Line	Old Main South	25.720	April 1876		
Gymea	GYM	Gymea	Eastern Suburbs & Illawarra Line	Cronulla	27.940	16 December 1939		
Harris Park	HPK	Harris Park	North Shore & Western Line Leppington & Inner West Line Cumberland Line	Main Western	22.530	1883		
Heathcote	HTC	Heathcote	Eastern Suburbs & Illawarra Line	Illawarra	33.150	9 March 1886		
Helensburgh	HNB	Helensburgh	Eastern Suburbs & Illawarra Line	Illawarra	46.380	30 May 1915		Intercity Trains; Buses
Holsworthy	HOL	Holsworthy	Airport & South Line	East Hills	27.760	21 December 1987		
Homebush	HSH	Homebush	Leppington & Inner West Line Liverpool & Inner West Line	Main Suburban	12.740	26 September 1855		
Hornsby	HBY	Hornsby	North Shore & Western Line Northern Line (Sydney)	Main Northern; North Shore	33.860	17 September 1886	Hornsby (1886–1894); Hornsby Junction (1894–1900)	Interchange; Intercity Trains
Hurstville	HVL	Hurstville	Eastern Suburbs & Illawarra Line	Illawarra	14.840	15 October 1884		Intercity Trains; Buses
Ingleburn	IGB	Ingleburn	Airport & South Line	Main South	45.650	6 September 1859	Macquarie Fields (1869–1883)	
International Airport	INT	International	Airport & South Line	Airport	8.100	21 May 2000		Buses
Jannali	JNL	Jannali	Eastern Suburbs & Illawarra Line	Illawarra	22.720	7 February 1931		
Killara	KLA	Killara	North Shore & Western Line Northern Line (Sydney)	North Shore	15.890	10 June 1899		
Kings Cross	KSX	King Cross	Eastern Suburbs & Illawarra Line	Eastern Suburbs	3.410	23 June 1979		
Kingsgrove	KGV	Kingsgrove	Airport & South Line	East Hills	12.620	21 September 1931		
Kingswood	KWD	Kingswood	North Shore & Western Line	Main Western	52.700	1 September 1887	Cross Roads (1887–1888)	
Kirrawee	KEE	Kirrawee	Eastern Suburbs & Illawarra Line	Cronulla	26.640	16 December 1939		
Kogarah	KGH	Kogarah	Eastern Suburbs & Illawarra Line	Illawarra	11.610	15 October 1884		
Leightonfield	LTN	Leightonfield	Liverpool & Inner West Line	Main South	23.670	24 August 1942		
Leppington	LEP	Leppington	Leppington & Inner West Line Cumberland Line	South West	44.28	8 February 2015		
Leumeah	LUM	Leumeah	Airport & South Line	Main South	52.630	1886		
Lewisham	LWI	Lewisham	Leppington & Inner West Line Liverpool & Inner West Line	Main Suburban	6.250	1886 (original site); 19 December 1891 (present site)		
Lidcombe	LDC	Lidcombe	North Shore & Western Line Leppington & Inner West Line Liverpool & Inner West Line Lidcombe & Bankstown Line Olympic Park Line	Main Suburban	16.610	1 November 1858	Haslems Creek (1858–1876); Rookwood (1876–1914)	Major Interchange; Buses
Lindfield	LDD	Lindfield	North Shore & Western Line Northern Line (Sydney)	North Shore	14.600	1 January 1890		
Liverpool	LPO	Liverpool	Leppington & Inner West Line Liverpool & Inner West Line Cumberland Line	Main South	35.680	26 September 1856		Major Interchange; Buses
Loftus	LOF	Loftus	Eastern Suburbs & Illawarra Line	Illawarra	26.290cr	9 March 1886 (original site); 9 June 1917 (present site)	Loftus Junction (1886–1896)	
Macarthur	MCA	Macarthur	Airport & South Line	Main South	56.580	28 July 1985		Intercity Trains; Buses
Macdonaldtown	MAC	Macdonaldtown	Leppington & Inner West Line Liverpool & Inner West Line	Main Suburban	2.480	1878 (original site); 3 April 1892 (present site)		
Macquarie Fields	MQF	Macquarie Fields	Airport & South Line	Main South	43.800	3 October 1888		
Marayong	MYG	Marayong	North Shore & Western Line Cumberland Line	Richmond	37.410	2 October 1922		
Martin Place	MPC	Martins Place	Eastern Suburbs & Illawarra Line	Eastern Suburbs	2.100	23 June 1979		Major Interchange; Metro
Mascot	MCO	Mascot	Airport & South Line	Airport	5.100	21 May 2000		
Meadowbank	MEB	Meadowbank	Northern Line (Sydney)	Main Northern	18.180	1 September 1887	Meadow Bank (1887–1927)	
Merrylands	MLN	Merrylands	Leppington & Inner West Line Cumberland Line	Old Main South	23.470	6 July 1878		
Milsons Point	MPT	Milsons Point	North Shore & Western Line Northern Line (Sydney)	North Shore	4.434	1 May 1893 (first site); 30 May 1915 (second site); 13 July 1915 (third site); 28 July 1924 (fourth site); 20 March 1932 (present site)		
Minto	MIO	Minto	Airport & South Line	Main South	49.670	May 1874	Campbellfields (1874–1882)	
Miranda	MIJ	Miranda	Eastern Suburbs & Illawarra Line	Cronulla	29.510	16 December 1939		
Mortdale	MDE	Mortdale	Eastern Suburbs & Illawarra Line	Illawarra	17.060	20 March 1897 (original site); 14 September 1922 (present site)		
Mount Colah	MOC	Mount Colah	North Shore & Western Line	Main Northern	37.680	1 July 1887	Colah (1887–1906)	
Mount Druitt	MTT	Mount Druitt	North Shore & Western Line	Main Western	43.290	1 November 1915		
Mount Kuring-gai	MKI	Mount Kuring-gai	North Shore & Western Line	Main Northern	43.840	19 August 1881 (original site); 8 December 1974 (present site)	Kuring-gai (1901–1904)	
Mulgrave	MUV	Mulgrave	North Shore & Western Line Cumberland Line	Richmond	52.590	1 December 1864 (original site); 29 June 1939 (present site)		
Museum	MSM	Museum	Leppington & Inner West Line Liverpool & Inner West Line Airport & South Line	City Circle	4.990	20 December 1926		
Narwee	NWE	Narwee	Airport & South Line	East Hills	15.780	21 December 1931		
Newtown	NTN	Newtown	Leppington & Inner West Line Liverpool & Inner West Line	Main Suburban	3.100	26 September 1855		
Normanhurst	NOR	Normanhurst	Northern Line (Sydney)	Main Northern	31.720	21 November 1895	Hornsby (1895–1898)	
North Strathfield	NST	North Strathfield	Northern Line (Sydney)	Main Northern	13.380	9 June 1918		
North Sydney	NSY	North Sydney	North Shore & Western Line Northern Line (Sydney)	North Shore	5.130	20 March 1932		
Oatley	OAL	Oatley	Eastern Suburbs & Illawarra Line	Illawarra	18.280	1886	Oatley (1886–1889); Oatley's (1889–1890)	
Olympic Park	OLP	Olympic Park	Olympic Park Line	Olympic Park	17.330	1 May 1998		Future Major Interchange; Metro (Sydney Olympic Park metro station, under construction); Buses
Padstow	PDW	Padstow	Airport & South Line	East Hills	19.340	21 December 1931		
Panania	PAN	Panania	Airport & South Line	East Hills	22.550	21 December 1931		
Parramatta	PAR	Parramatta	North Shore & Western Line Leppington & Inner West Line Cumberland Line	Main Western	23.210	26 September 1855 (original site); 4 July 1860 (present site)		Interchange; Metro (Parramatta metro station, under construction); Intercity Trains; Buses
Pendle Hill	PDH	Pendle Hill	North Shore & Western Line Cumberland Line	Main Western	28.290	12 April 1924		
Pennant Hills	PNT	Pennant Hills	Northern Line (Sydney)	Main Northern	28.580	17 September 1886		
Penrith	PNR	Penrith	North Shore & Western Line	Main Western	55.090	19 January 1863		Major Interchange; Buses
Penshurst	PHS	Penhurst	Eastern Suburbs & Illawarra Line	Illawarra	18.280	1886 (original site); 4 April 1905 (present site)		
Petersham	PSM	Petersham	Leppington & Inner West Line Liverpool & Inner West Line	Main Suburban	5.500	6 January 1857		
Pymble	PYB	Pymble	North Shore & Western Line	North Shore	18.900	1 January 1890		
Quakers Hill	QKH	Quakers Hill	North Shore & Western Line Cumberland Line	Richmond	40.090	1872 (as siding); 30 March 1905 (original site); 29 June 1939 (present site)	Douglas Siding (1872–1905)	
Redfern	REF	Redfern	North Shore & Western Line Leppington & Inner West Line Liverpool & Inner West Line Eastern Suburbs & Illawarra Line Airport & South Line Northern Line (Sydney)	Main Suburban; Illawarra	1.300	15 April 1878	Eveleigh (1878–1906)	Major interchange Intercity Trains; Buses
Regents Park	RGP	Regents Park	Liverpool & Inner West Line Lidcombe & Bankstown Line	Main South	19.860	11 November 1912 (original site); 2 March 1914 (with platform); 8 October 1924 (present site)		
Revesby	RSY	Revesby	Airport & South Line	East Hills	20.960	21 December 1931		
Rhodes	RDS	Rhodes	Northern Line (Sydney)	Main Northern	16.580	17 September 1886		
Richmond	RCD	Richmond	North Shore & Western Line Cumberland Line	Richmond	60.680	1 December 1864		
Riverstone	RVS		North Shore & Western Line Cumberland Line	Richmond	45.960	1 December 1864		
Riverwood	RVD	Riverwood	Airport & South Line	East Hills	20.960	21 December 1931	Herne Bay (1931–1958)	
Rockdale	RKL	Rochdale	Eastern Suburbs & Illawarra Line	Illawarra	10.410	15 October 1884		
Rooty Hill	RYH	Rooty Hill	North Shore & Western Line	Main Western	40.910	23 December 1861 (originally); 1 January 1862 (with platform); 1 December 1864 (after closure 21 July 1862)		
Roseville	RVL	Roseville	North Shore & Western Line Northern Line (Sydney)	North Shore	13.270	1 January 1890	Rossville (1890)	
Schofields	SFS	Schofields	North Shore & Western Line Cumberland Line	Richmond	43.750	1870 (original site); 29 October 2011 (present site)		
Sefton	SFT	Sefton	Liverpool & Inner West Line	Main South	21.190	8 October 1924		
Seven Hills	SEV	Seven Hills	North Shore & Western Line Cumberland Line	Main Western	32.060	1 December 1863 (originally); 6 February 1869 (with platform)		
St James	STJ	St James	Leppington & Inner West Line Liverpool & Inner West Line Airport & South Line	City Circle	4.400	20 December 1926		
St Leonards	SNL	St Leonards	North Shore & Western Line Northern Line (Sydney)	North Shore	8.410	1 January 1890		
St Marys	STM	St Marys	North Shore & Western Line	Main Western	47.420	1 May 1862	South Creek (1862–1885)	Future Major Interchange; Metro (under construction)
St Peters	SAP	St Peters	Airport & South Line	Illawarra	3.810	15 October 1884		
Stanmore	SMN	Stanmore	Leppington & Inner West Line Liverpool & Inner West Line	Main Suburban	4.670	1878		
Strathfield	STR	Strathfield	North Shore & Western Line Leppington & Inner West Line Liverpool & Inner West Line Olympic Park Line Northern Line (Sydney)	Main Suburban	11.810	9 July 1876 (original site); 23 September 1900 (second site); 6 November 1922 (present site)	Redmyre (1876–1885)	Major Interchange; Intercity Trains; Buses
Summer Hill	SMH	Summer Hill	Leppington & Inner West Line Liverpool & Inner West Line	Main Suburban	7.030	15 September 1879		
Sutherland	SLD	Sutherland	Eastern Suburbs & Illawarra Line	Illawarra	24.640	26 December 1885		Intercity Trains; Buses
Sydenham	SDN	Sydenham	Eastern Suburbs & Illawarra Line Airport & South Line	Illawarra	5.310	15 October 1884	Marrickville (1884–1895)	Major Interchange; Metro; Buses
Tempe	TME	Tempe	Eastern Suburbs & Illawarra Line	Illawarra	6.840	15 October 1884		
Thornleigh	THO	Thornleigh	Northern Line (Sydney)	Main Northern	29.430	17 September 1886		
Toongabbie	TGB	Toongabbie	North Shore & Western Line Cumberland Line	Main Western	29.960	26 April 1880		
Town Hall	THL	Town Hall	North Shore & Western Line Leppington & Inner West Line Liverpool & Inner West Line Eastern Suburbs & Illawarra Line Airport & South Line Northern Line (Sydney)	North Shore; City Circle; Illawarra	1.180	28 February 1932		Major Interchange; Metro (Gadigal station); Buses; Light Rail
Turramurra	TMU	Turramurra	North Shore & Western Line	North Shore	20.820	1 January 1890	Eastern Road (1890)	
Turrella	TLL	Turrella	Airport & South Line	East Hills	8.630	21 September 1931		
Villawood	VWD	Villawood	Liverpool & Inner West Line	Main South	24.500	8 October 1924		
Vineyard	VYR	Vineyard	North Shore & Western Line Cumberland Line	Richmond	49.230	14 July 1935		
Wahroonga	WRO	Wahroonga	North Shore & Western Line	North Shore	22.770	1 January 1890	Pearces Corner (1890)	
Waitara	WTA	Waitara	North Shore & Western Line	North Shore	24.210	20 April 1895		
Warrawee	WWE	Warrawee	North Shore & Western Line	North Shore	21.89	1 August 1900		
Warwick Farm	WWF	Warwick Farm	Leppington & Inner West Line Liverpool & Inner West Line Cumberland Line	Main South	28.430	18 March 1889		
Waterfall	WFL	Waterfall	Eastern Suburbs & Illawarra Line	Illawarra	38.740	9 March 1886 (original site); 1890 (second site); 4 May 1905 (present site)	Waterfalls (1886)	Intercity Trains
Waverton	WVT	Waverton	North Shore & Western Line Northern Line (Sydney)	North Shore	6.110	1 May 1893	Bay Road (1893–1929)	
Wentworthville	WVL	Wentworthville	North Shore & Western Line Cumberland Line	Main Western	26.640	1883	T R Smith's Platform (1883–1885)	
Werrington	WRT	Werrington	North Shore & Western Line	Main Western	49.080	2 May 1868	Parkes Platform (1868–1893)	
West Ryde	WSR	West Ryde	Northern Line (Sydney)	Main Northern	19.200	17 September 1886	Ryde (1886–1945)	
Westmead	WMD	Westmead	North Shore & Western Line Cumberland Line	Main Western	25.160	March 1883		Intercity Trains; Buses; Light rail
Windsor	WSR	Windsor	North Shore & Western Line Cumberland Line	Richmond	54.980	1 December 1864		
Wolli Creek	WCI, WCA, WCJ	Wolli Creek	Eastern Suburbs & Illawarra Line Airport & South Line	Airport; Illawarra	7.300	21 May 2000		Intercity Trains; Buses
Wollstonecraft	WSC	Wollstonecraft	North Shore & Western Line Northern Line (Sydney)	North Shore	7.180	1 May 1893	Edwards Road (1893–1900)	
Woolooware	WOE	Woolooware	Eastern Suburbs & Illawarra Line	Cronulla	33.600	16 December 1939		
Wynyard	WYN	Wynyard	North Shore & Western Line Leppington & Inner West Line Liverpool & Inner West Line Airport & South Line Northern Line (Sydney)	North Shore; City Circle	2.050	28 February 1932		Major Interchange; Metro (Barangaroo station); Buses; Ferries (Barangaroo ferry wharf); Light Rail
Yagoona	YOA	Yagoona	Lidcombe & Bankstown Line	Bankstown	20.560	16 July 1928		
Yennora	YNR	Yennora	Leppington & Inner West Line Cumberland Line	Old Main South	27.440	6 November 1927		

== See also ==
- Railways in Sydney
- List of closed railway stations in Sydney
- Proposed railways in Sydney
- List of Sydney Metro stations
- List of NSW TrainLink railway stations

=== Related ===
- Lists of railway stations
- List of metro systems
- List of suburban and commuter rail systems
- List of Sydney suburbs
- Public transport in Sydney
- Railways in Sydney
- Transport in Australia
