= Berala railway station =

Railway station in Sydney, New South Wales, Australia

Berala
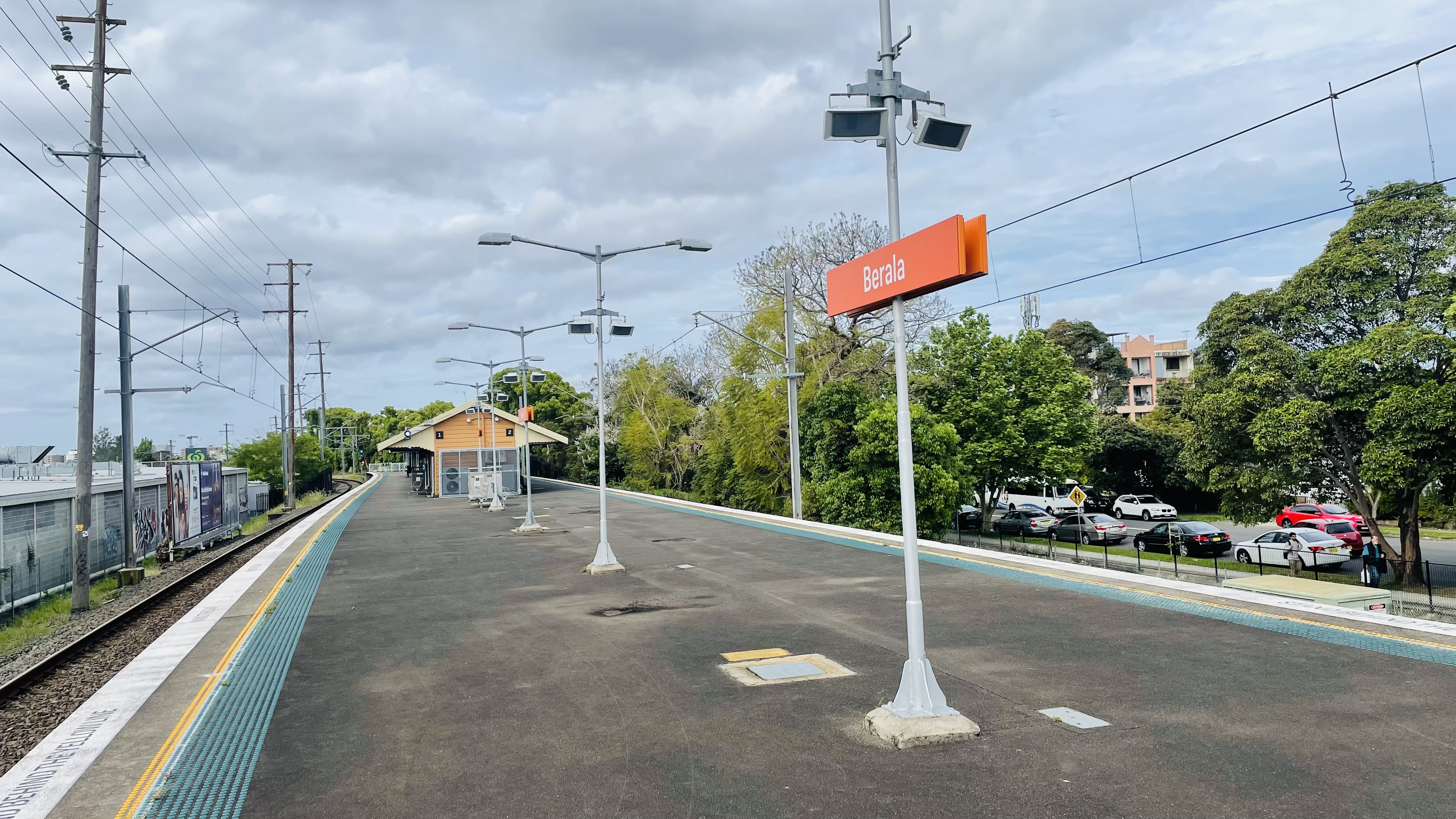
- Northeast-bound view from Platform 1 in October 2022

General information
- Location: Woodburn Road, Berala; Sydney, New South Wales; Australia
- Coordinates: 33°52′19″S 151°01′56″E
- Elevation: 25 metres (82 ft)
- Owner: Transport Asset Manager of NSW
- Operator: Sydney Trains
- Line: Main Southern
- Distance: 18.36 km (11.41 mi) from Central
- Platforms: 2 (1 island)
- Tracks: 2
- Connections: Bus

Construction
- Structure type: Elevated
- Accessible: Yes

Other information
- Status: Weekdays: Staffed: 6am to 7pm: Weekends and public holidays: Unstaffed
- Station code: BEJ
- Website: Transport for NSW

History
- Opened: 11 November 1912 (113 years ago)
- Rebuilt: 6 December 1924 (101 years ago)
- Electrified: Yes (from December 1929)
- Former names: Sidmouth (during construction); Torrington (during construction); Bareela (during construction)

Passengers
- 2025: 1,000,535 (year); 2,741 (daily) (Sydney Trains)
- Rank: 127

Services
Preceding station	Sydney Trains	Following station
Regents Park towards Liverpool	Liverpool & Inner West Line	Lidcombe towards City Circle
Lidcombe Terminus	Lidcombe & Bankstown Line	Regents Park towards Bankstown
Former services
Preceding station	Sydney Trains	Following station
Lidcombe towards Lidcombe or Liverpool	Bankstown Line (until 2024)	Regents Park towards City Circle
Location

Berala railway station is a suburban railway station located on the Main Southern line, serving the Sydney suburb of Berala. It is served by Sydney Trains T3 Liverpool & Inner West Line and T6 Lidcombe & Bankstown Line services.

== History ==
The original Berala station opened on 11 November 1912 when a line opened from Lidcombe to Regents Park. The station was known as Sidmouth, Torrington and Bareela at various times during construction, but was ultimately named Berala. When it was decided to extend the line from Regents Park to Cabramatta as a branch of the Main South line, a deviation was built and a new Berala station opened on 6 December 1924. The NSW Government originally proposed the current alignment of the railway be without rail bridges over Vaughan St and Kerrs Road prompting a Lidcomobe Council led community backlash in the early 1920s. The line through Berala was electrified on 2 December 1929.

An accessibility upgrade, including lift access to the station, was announced in 2015. As of August 2017, Berala Station is now wheelchair accessible by way of lift.

In February 2018, during a Cumberland City Council meeting Councillor Kun Huang cited historical NSW Government land subdivision posters outlining direct train services from Berala to Sydney (via Lidcombe) in the 1930s had a journey time of 22 minutes.

The NSW Government changes to train services have generally lacked community support from Berala commuters, with resentment from the removal of direct services to City Circle and Liverpool via Regents Park in 2013 as well as opposition to the Sydney Metro Southwest project due to the removal of alternative route to City Circle via Bankstown and Sydenham.

== Services ==
=== Platforms ===
Historically Berala was served by services from the City Circle and Lidcombe operating to Bankstown and Liverpool on an alternate basis. This changed in the early 2000s, when most services to Liverpool were altered to operate via Bankstown. With the terminus of services to Museum changed to Homebush on 20 October 2013, Platform 1 operated two daily City services via Strathfield and otherwise operated Lidcombe services. Since 19 October 2024, Berala is served by T3 Liverpool & Inner West Line with services to City Circle and shuttle services on the T6 Lidcombe & Bankstown Line.

Platform	Line	Stopping pattern	Notes
1	T3	services to Central & the City Circle via Lidcombe	
1	T6	services to Lidcombe	
2	T3	services to Liverpool via Regents Park	
2	T6	services to Bankstown	

=== Transport links ===
Transit Systems NSW operates one bus route via Berala station, under contract to Transport for NSW:

- 908: Bankstown station to Merrylands station

Berala station is served by one NightRide route:

- N50: Liverpool station to Town Hall station

== See also ==
- Railway accidents in New South Wales § Berala train collision, 1952
