= Yagoona =

- Suburb
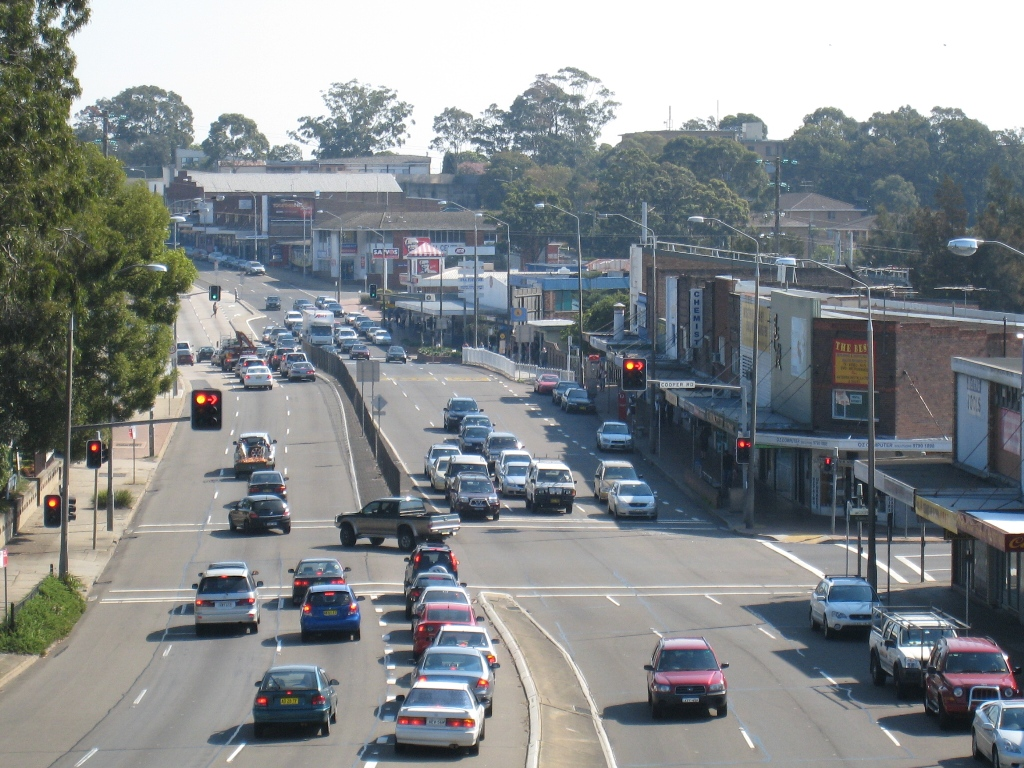
- Hume Highway, Yagoona

- Interactive map of Yagoona
- Coordinates: 33.9078°S 151.0251°E
- Country: Australia
- State: New South Wales
- City: Sydney
- LGA: City of Canterbury-Bankstown
- Location: 20 km (12 mi) south-west of Sydney CBD
- Established: 1927

Government
  - State electorates: Auburn; Bankstown
  - Federal divisions: Blaxland; Watson

Area
  - Total: 4.47 km^{2} (1.73 sq mi)
- Elevation: 45 m (148 ft)

Population
  - Total: 19,651 (2021 census)
  - Density: 4,396/km^{2} (11,386/sq mi)
- Postcode: 2199
Suburbs around Yagoona
Sefton	Birrong	Chullora
Bass Hill	Yagoona	Greenacre
Georges Hall	Condell Park	Bankstown

Yagoona is a suburb in South Western Sydney in the state of New South Wales, Australia. It is part of the local government area in City of Canterbury-Bankstown and is located 20 kilometres south-west of the Sydney central business district, Yagoona is an Aboriginal word meaning 'now' or 'today'.

== History ==
The area now known as Yagoona—Bass Hill, and north Bankstown—was once known as Irish Town, due to the high concentration of Irish rebels transported here from Ireland in the late 1700s. Land grants were issued to Irish families and finally the suburb of Yagoona was created in 1927. St Matthew's Anglican Church was built on Liverpool Road (now Hume Highway) in 1861 to cater for the Protestants of the district as well as to function as a school.

== Commercial area ==
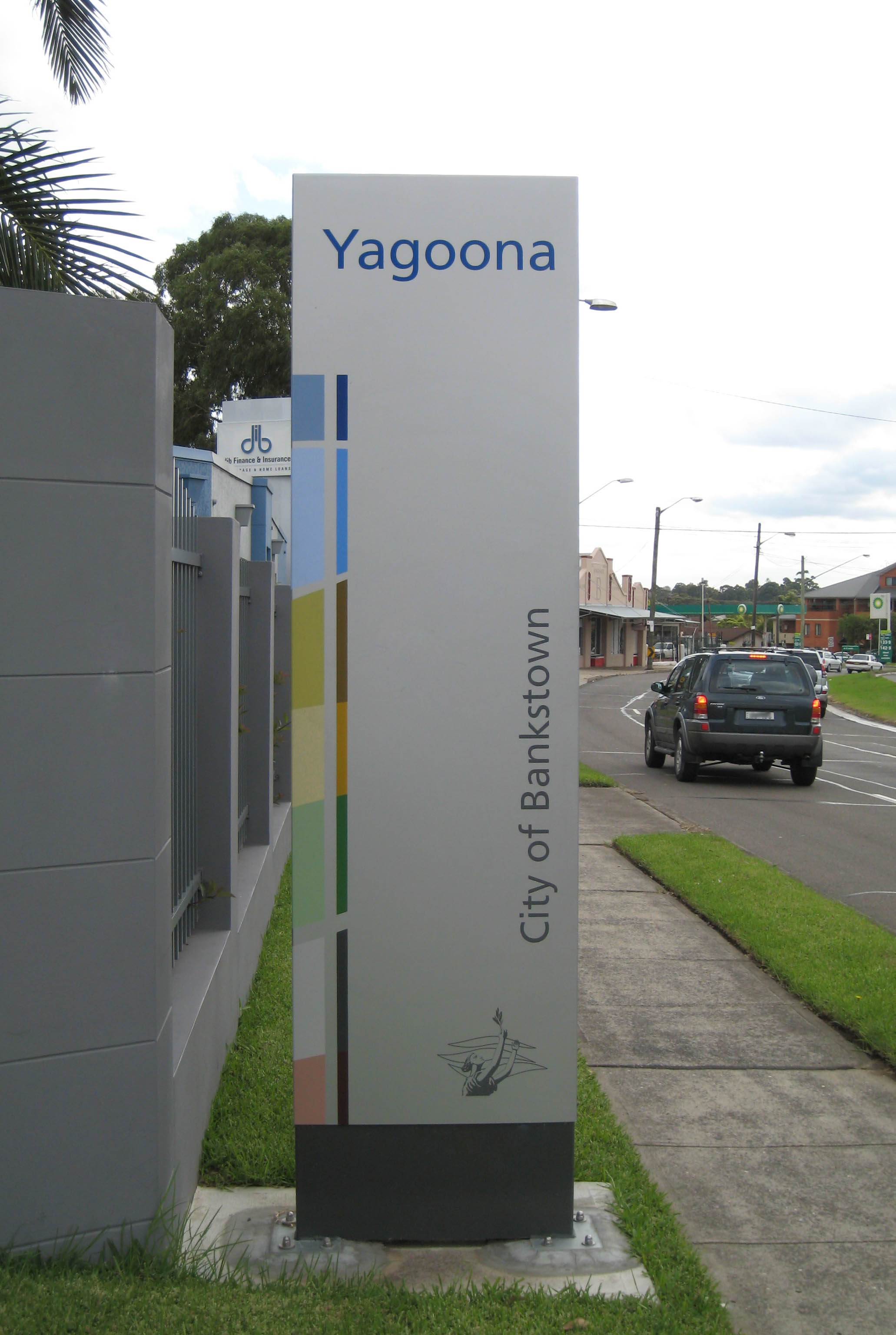
Entering Yagoona from Bankstown along the Hume Highway

The main commercial area is located on the Hume Highway (Liverpool Road), near Yagoona railway station. In 1963, the Westfield Group built a supermarket on a vacant lot on the highway; the store opened as Coles New World, later became Franklins, and then an IGA. Yagoona was home to the first McDonald's restaurant in Australia, opened in 1971, but it closed in 1994. In July 2021, it was confirmed that a new McDonald's restaurant will open on the very same site as the first restaurant in Australia, coinciding with the franchise's 50th anniversary celebrations in the country. The restaurant opened on 17 December 2021.

Over recent years, this shopping strip has been in economic decline as a consequence of major banks (Commonwealth, National Australia and Westpac) and retailers leaving. Residents now find it more convenient to shop at nearby Bass Hill Plaza or further away at Bankstown Central or Westfield Parramatta. There have been some plans to rejuvenate the town centre in Yagoona in recent years by Bankstown City Council. "Initial suggestions, already supported by residents and visitors, include a larger supermarket, a new community centre, improved shopping environment, and a variation in housing."

The head office of RSPCA NSW, plus a shelter, is located along Rookwood Road in this suburb.

== Transport ==
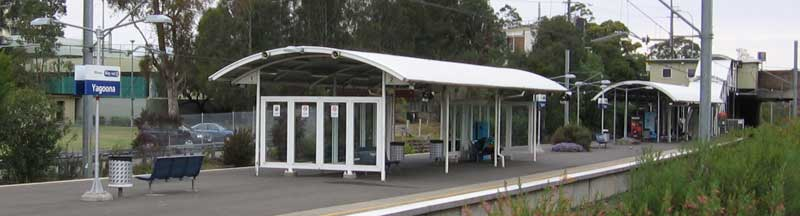
Yagoona railway station

Yagoona railway station is on the Bankstown line of the Sydney Trains network. A number of bus services link Yagoona to Bankstown and Parramatta. Yagoona is located some 5–10 minutes from Bankstown Central Business District and about 10–15 minutes from Parramatta CBD.

The Hume Highway cuts through Yagoona and is the main road access for Yagoona to Liverpool and Sydney City; and Rookwood Road connects south to Stacey Street/Fairford Road (Entrance to the M5), and north to Silverwater Road (Access to the M4). A 30-metre pedestrian bridge costing A$2.3 million linking the side footpaths of Hume Highway was built in 2006, primarily to ensure easy and safe access travel in this area for the students of Yagoona Primary School. Lifts are located at each end to ensure easy access for those with disabilities. The construction of the bridge was funded by the Government of New South Wales. The bridge will also help streamline Hume Highway traffic by removing the previous set of traffic lights.

== Schools ==
There are three Primary Schools in Yagoona:

- Yagoona Public School
- Christ the King Catholic School
- Al Sadiq College is an Alawite Muslim School (Kindergarten and Years 1 to 4) that was recently built close to Yagoona's Town Centre, at 178 Cooper Road, to cater for the growing Alawite population.

There are no high schools in the suburb. Most students attend high schools in adjoining suburbs, normally Birrong, Bass Hill, Bankstown, Condell Park or Sefton.

== Parks ==
Yagoona is home to Gazzard Park, George Green Oval, Gillman Reserve, Middleton Park, Graf Park and O'Neill Park. All the parks contain various sporting facilities and play equipment.

== Churches ==
Yagoona has seven places of worship. These include:

- Yagoona Anglican Church
- Yagoona Baptist Church which is now Graceway Church
- Christ the King Catholic Church
- Yagoona Christadelphian Ecclesia
- Prayer on Wheels Yagoona
- Lutheran Church of Australia
- Christian Mission Fellowship

== Demographics ==
In the 2021 Census, there were 19,651 people in Yagoona. 49.6% of people were born in Australia. The next most common countries of birth were Vietnam 12.1%, Lebanon 8.4%, China 2.0%, North Macedonia 1.8% and Syria 1.5%. 27.9% of people spoke only English at home. Other languages spoken at home included Arabic 27.2%, Vietnamese 15.8%, Macedonian 3.0%, Cantonese 2.6% and Urdu 1.8%. The most common responses for religion were Islam 31.1%, Catholic 21.6% and No Religion 12.1%.

== Culture ==
=== Yagoona Autumn Fair ===
Each year an Autumn Fair was hosted in Yagoona's Gazzard Park, designed to allow the community to express their aims and objectives, as well as to raise funds for community projects and work. Its final year was around 2009. Events include a ticket raffle, Yagoona Scouts $1 sausage sizzle, free rides, a non-stop stage show, face painting and more. On at least one occasion, the fair was held in the Spring rather than Autumn.

2007 Autumn Fair Pictures

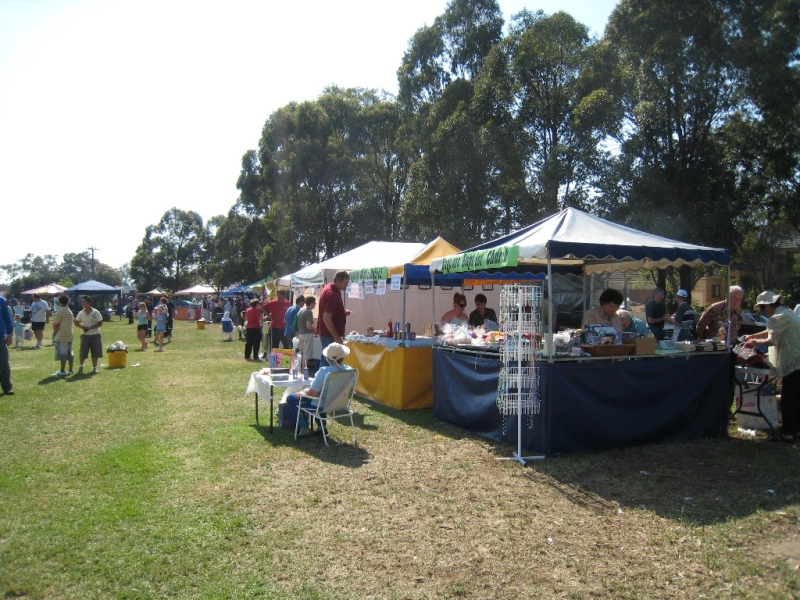
Stalls

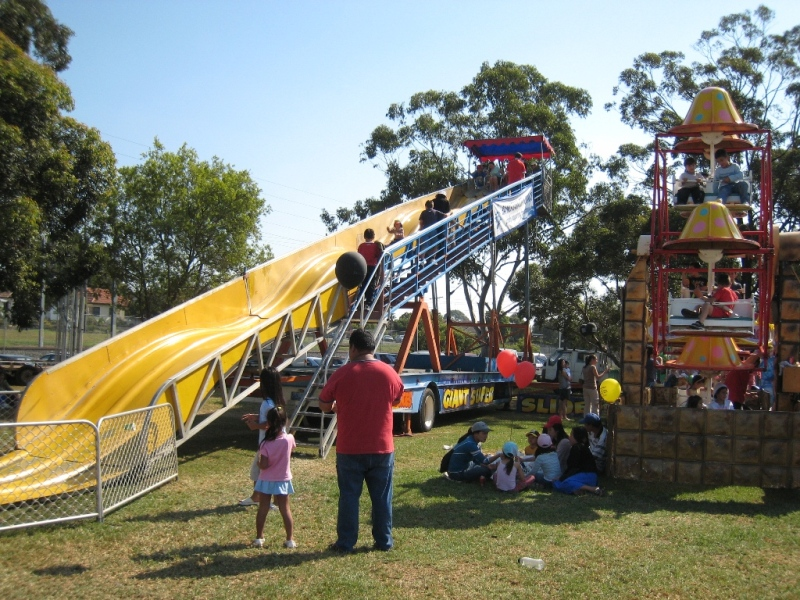
Slide

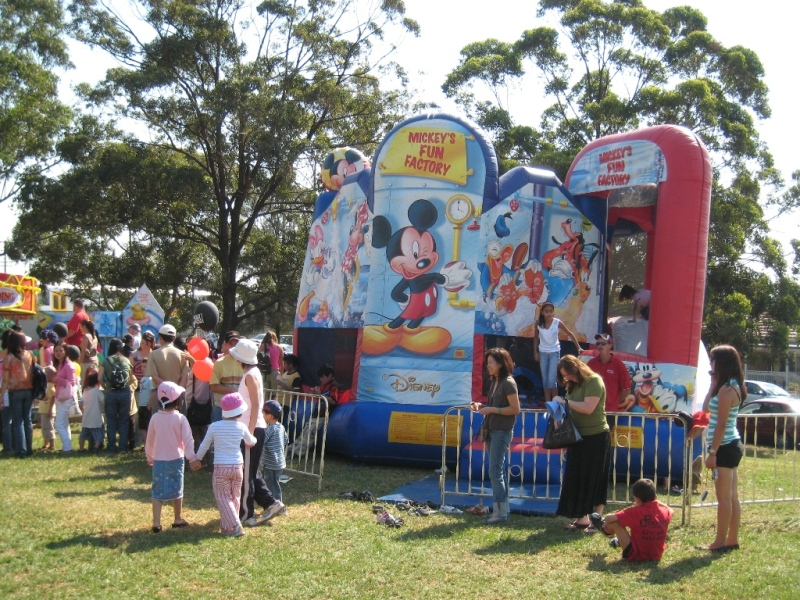
Jumping castle

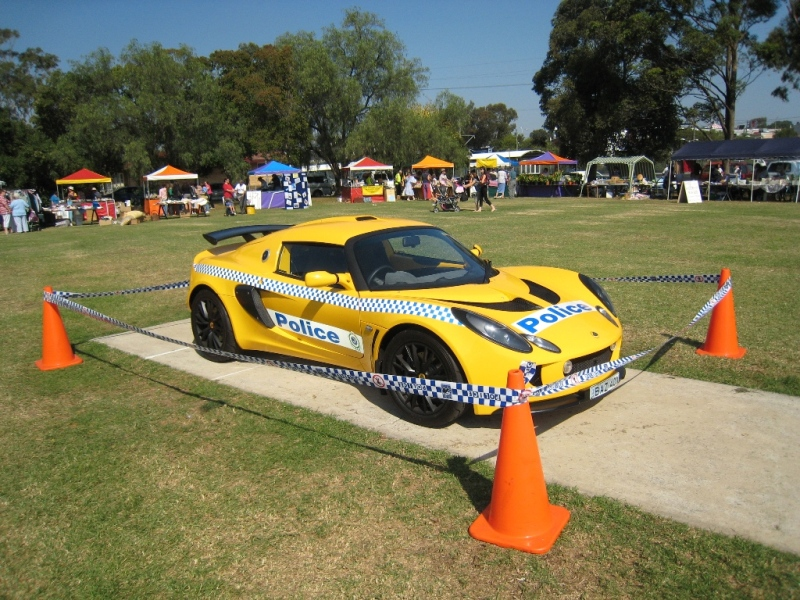
Lotus Exige police car on display

=== Popular culture ===
Footy Legends, written by Khoa and Anh Do, directed by the former and starring the latter, is a drama movie set in Yagoona. It makes references to the social issues in the area and revolves around an amateur rugby league team consisting of socially disaffected people.

== Sport ==
The local sports team is the Yagoona Lions football team, a member of the Bankstown District Amateur Football Association. The Lions' home-ground is at O'Neill Park.

The Yagoona Schooners (Rugby league).

== Notable people ==
- Anh Do, Vietnamese Australian actor and stand-up comedian
- Khoa Do, actor, writer and director (brother of Anh Do)
