= Waterfall station =

Waterfall Station may refer to:

- Waterfall railway station (Ireland), a former station near Cork, Ireland
- Waterfall railway station (Isle of Man), a former station on the Isle of Man in the British Isles
- Waterfall railway station (Snowdon Mountain Railway), a former station on the Snowdon Mountain Railway in Wales
- Waterfall railway station, Sydney, Australia
  - Waterfall train disaster
- Waterfall Station (Singapore) of Jurong Bird Park Panorail, Singapore
- Waterfall Station (Taiwan) of Wulai Scenic Train, Taiwan
