= Regents Park railway station =

Railway station in Sydney, New South Wales, Australia

Regents Park
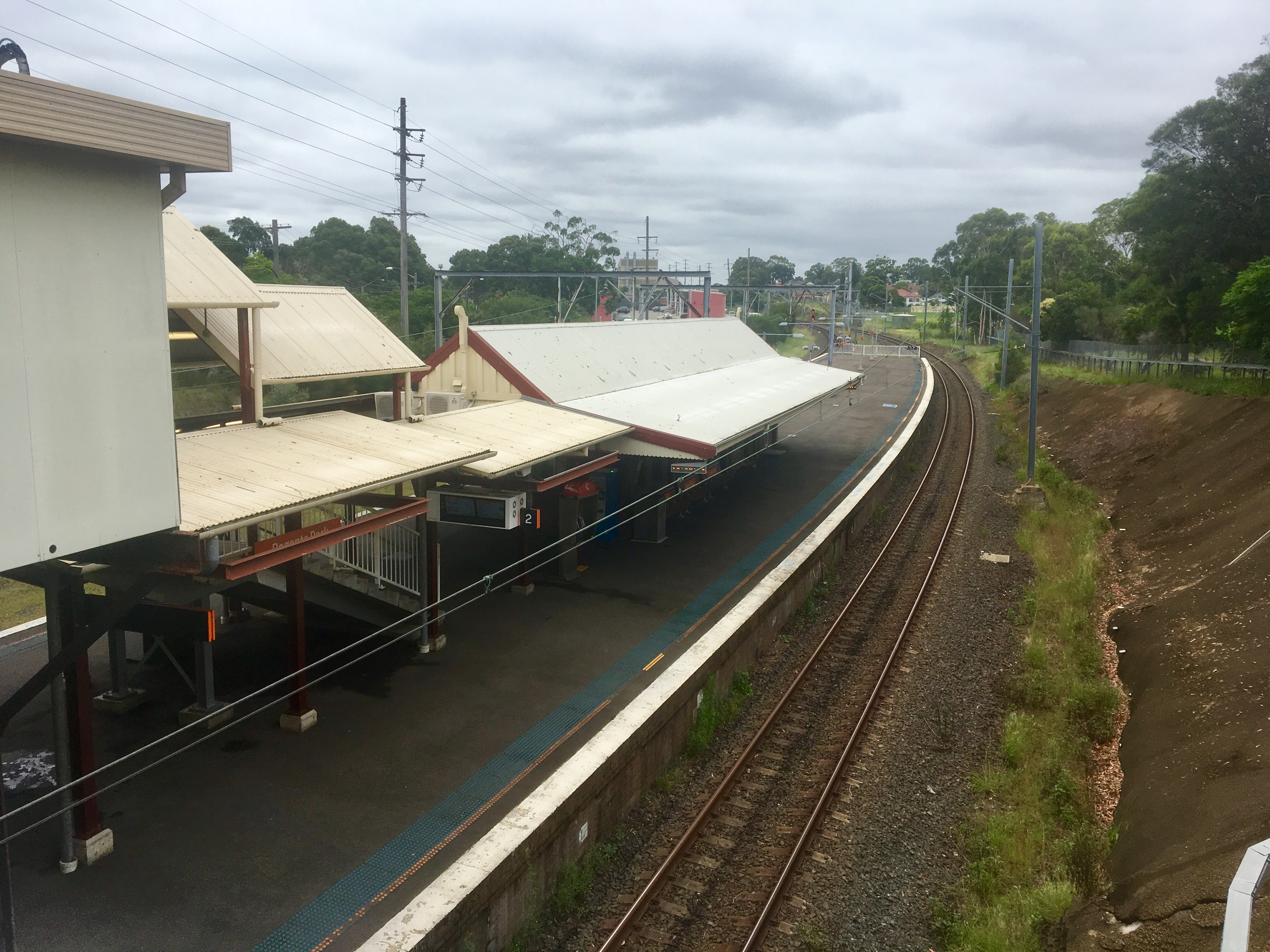
- North-east bound view of Platform 2 in January 2019

General information
- Location: Park Road, Regents Park; Sydney, New South Wales; Australia
- Coordinates: 33°52′59″S 151°01′27″E
- Elevation: 35 metres (115 ft)
- Owner: Transport Asset Manager of NSW
- Operator: Sydney Trains
- Line: Main Southern
- Distance: 19.86 km (12.34 mi) from Central
- Platforms: 2 (1 island)
- Tracks: 2
- Connections: Bus

Construction
- Structure type: Ground
- Accessible: Yes

Other information
- Status: Staffed
- Station code: RGP
- Website: Transport for NSW

History
- Opened: 11 November 1912 (113 years ago)
- Rebuilt: 8 October 1924 (102 years ago)
- Electrified: Yes (from December 1929)

Passengers
- 2025: 745,973 (year); 2,044 (daily) (Sydney Trains)
- Rank: 139

Services
Preceding station	Sydney Trains	Following station
Sefton towards Liverpool	Liverpool & Inner West Line	Berala towards City Circle
Berala towards Lidcombe	Lidcombe & Bankstown Line	Birrong towards Bankstown
Former services
Preceding station	Sydney Trains	Following station
Berala towards Lidcombe or Liverpool	Bankstown Line (until 2024)	Birrong towards City Circle
Location

Regents Park railway station is a suburban railway station located on the Main Southern line, serving the Sydney suburb of Regents Park. It is served by Sydney Trains T3 Liverpool & Inner West Line and T6 Lidcombe & Bankstown Line services.

== History ==
Regents Park station originally opened on 11 November 1912 when a line was built from Lidcombe. The station was moved in 1924 when the Main South line was extended to Cabramatta in an attempt to reduce overcrowding on the Main Western railway line. The new station opened on 8 October 1924, built in a characteristic standard design of this period.

A booking and parcels office was constructed on the footbridge as part of the 1924 station. This was replaced with the present building in 1945, and later converted into a kiosk.

In 2001, a lift was installed from the footbridge down to the platform, and new canopies built connecting to the platform buildings and over the existing footbridge.

Immediately south of the station lies Sefton Park Junction with services heading south to Bankstown via the Bankstown line and west to Liverpool via the Main South line. The Southern Sydney Freight Line passes beneath the junction. Until it closed in April 1966, Regents Park was the junction for a line to Potts Hill Reservoir and sidings serving an industrial complex to the north-west of the station.

Regents Park Station held a celebration for the centenary of the Lidcombe to Cabramatta railway on 14 October 2024 with Sydney Trains staff, Member for Auburn Lynda Voltz, and local residents.

== Services ==
=== Platforms ===
Historically, Regents Park was served by services from the city and Lidcombe operating to Bankstown and Liverpool on an alternate basis. This changed in the early 2000s, when most services to Liverpool were altered to operate via Bankstown, and in 2013, regular services for Regents Park was limited to the T3 Bankstown Line between Lidcombe and City Circle via Bankstown. Today, Regents Park is served by T3 Liverpool & Inner West Line with services to City Circle and shuttle services on the T6 Lidcombe & Bankstown Line. Regents Park is now the interchange between the T3 Line and T6 Line for commuters travelling between Liverpool and Bankstown.

Platform	Line	Stopping pattern	Notes
1	Liverpool & Inner West Line	services to Central & the City Circle via Lidcombe	
1	Lidcombe & Bankstown Line	services to Lidcombe	
2	Liverpool & Inner West Line	services to Liverpool	
2	Lidcombe & Bankstown Line	services to Bankstown	

=== Transport links ===
Transit Systems NSW operates two bus routes via Regents Park station, under contract to Transport for NSW:

- 908: Bankstown station to Merrylands station
- 909: Bankstown station to Parramatta station

Regents Park station is served by one NightRide route:

- N50: Liverpool to City (Town Hall)
