= Lidcombe railway station =

Railway station in Sydney, New South Wales, Australia

Lidcombe
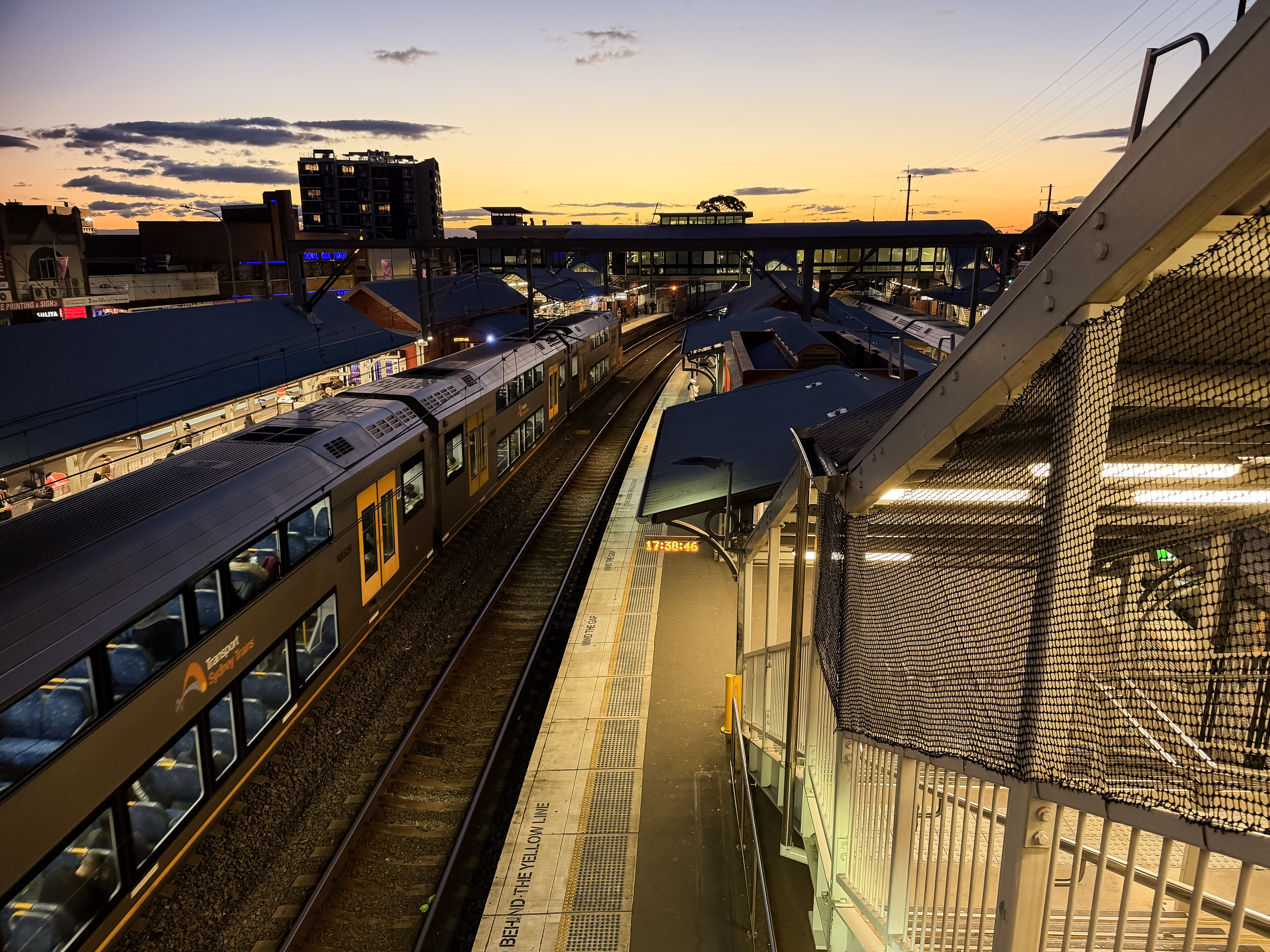
- Westbound view in August 2026

General information
- Location: Railway Parade, Lidcombe; Sydney, New South Wales; Australia
- Coordinates: 33°51′50″S 151°02′43″E
- Elevation: 22 metres (72 ft)
- Owner: Transport Asset Manager of NSW
- Operator: Sydney Trains
- Lines: Main Suburban; Main Southern; Olympic Park
- Distance: 16.61 km (10.32 mi) from Central
- Platforms: 6 (2 bay, 2 side, 1 island)
- Tracks: 6
- Connections: Bus

Construction
- Structure type: Ground
- Accessible: Yes

Other information
- Status: Staffed
- Station code: LDC
- Website: Transport for NSW

History
- Opened: 1 November 1858 (168 years ago)
- Electrified: Yes (from 1928)
- Former names: Haslam's Creek (1858–1878); Rookwood (1878–1914)

Passengers
- 2025: 7,861,457 (year); 21,538 (daily) (Sydney Trains)
- Rank: 22

Services
Preceding station	Sydney Trains	Following station
Auburn towards Penrith	T1 North Shore & Western Line Weekday limited and weekends only	Strathfield towards Berowra
Granville towards Richmond	T1 North Shore & Western Line	Strathfield towards Berowra
Parramatta towards Emu Plains or Richmond	T1 North Shore & Western Line	Strathfield towards Berowra
Auburn towards Parramatta or Leppington	T2 Leppington & Inner West Line	Flemington towards City Circle
Berala towards Liverpool	T3 Liverpool & Inner West Line	Flemington towards City Circle
Berala towards Liverpool	T3 Liverpool & Inner West Line Express (Weekdays only)	Homebush towards City Circle
Terminus	T6 Lidcombe & Bankstown Line	Berala towards Bankstown
Terminus	T7 Olympic Park Line	Olympic Park Terminus
Other services
Former services
Preceding station	Sydney Trains	Following station
Terminus	Bankstown Line (until 2024)	Berala towards City Circle
Preceding station	Former services	Following station
Auburn towards Bourke	Main Western Line (1887–1967)	Rookwood towards Sydney
Cemetery Station No. 1 towards Cemetery Station No. 4	Rookwood Cemetery Line (1865-1948)	Regent Street Terminus
Pippita towards Abattoirs	Abattoirs Line (1911–1995)	Auburn Terminus
Pippita towards Abattoirs	Abattoirs Line (1911–1995)	Terminus
Location

Lidcombe railway station is a suburban railway station located on the Main Suburban line, serving the Sydney suburb of Lidcombe. It is served by Sydney Trains T1 Western, T2 Leppington & Inner West, T3 Liverpool & Inner West Line, T6 Lidcombe & Bankstown Line and T7 Olympic Park Line services.

== History ==
Lidcombe station opened on 1 November 1858 as Haslam's Creek after local landowner, Samuel Haslam. When in 1867 land was set aside for a cemetery nearby, the residents renamed the locality Rookwood. The official name of the station followed, being renamed Rookwood in 1878. By the turn of the century the Necropolis was also called Rookwood, so on 1 January 1914 the station name was renamed again to Lidcombe.

On 11 November 1912, Lidcombe became a junction station, with the opening of a deviation of the Main South line to Regents Park.

On 23 April 1999, Platform 0 was opened as part of the Olympic Park line project. As part of this work, the station was refurbished and a second footbridge added at the eastern end.

In 2007, the Lidcombe Station Upgrade project removed the Walter Bowmer Memorial Reserve and Memorial Plaque (dedicated by Auburn Council in 1986 to former alderman Walter Bowner, who served in the 1950s and had a hairdressing salon at the site) located on the western end of the station adjacent to Tooheys Lane.

The station works as part of the CityRail Clearways Project completed in 2010 featured a new platform for terminating trains from the Bankstown Line. This was built in conjunction with the Homebush turnback, which claimed to improve reliability on the Inner West & Leppington Line.

A new train timetable implemented in October 2013 resulted in the discontinuation of all Bankstown Line to City via Regents Park services and discontinuation of almost all trains to Liverpool via Regents Park prompting a community campaign to reinstate lost services.

In 2020, the NSW Legislative Council Inquiry into Sydenham to Bankstown line conversion questioned the need to terminate services at Lidcombe, and recommended that both Bankstown to City via Regents Park and Liverpool to City via Regents Park services be reinstated. The Liverpool to City via Regents Park service was subsequently reinstated in the October 2024 timetable.

== Services ==
=== Platforms ===
Lidcombe has six platforms: five for ordinary suburban services, and one for the shuttle between Lidcombe and Olympic Park – numbered as Platform 0 and known as the Olympic Park Sprint platform. During times of special events, some train services may make additional calls at Lidcombe.

Platform	Line	Stopping pattern	Notes
0	Olympic Park railway line	services to Olympic Park	
1	T1 North Shore & Western Line	services to North Sydney, Hornsby & Berowra via Central (Weekdays only)	
2	T1 North Shore & Western Line	services to Blacktown, Penrith, Schofields, Richmond & Emu Plains (Weekdays only)	
3	T1 North Shore & Western Line	services to North Sydney, Lindfield, Hornsby & Berowra via Central	
3	T2 Leppington & Inner West Line	services to Central & the City Circle	
3	T3 Liverpool & Inner West Line	services to Central & the City Circle	
4	T1 North Shore & Western Line	services to Penrith, Richmond & Emu Plains	
4	T2 Leppington & Inner West Line	services to Parramatta & Leppington via Granville	
4	T3 Liverpool & Inner West Line	services to Liverpool via Regents Park	
5	T6 Lidcombe & Bankstown Line	terminating services to & from Bankstown	

=== Transport links ===
Transit Systems operates five bus routes via Lidcombe station:

- 401: to Lidcombe Birnie Avenue loop service
- 525: to Parramatta station via Newington
- 915: to University of Sydney Cumberland Campus (limited semester service)
- 920: to Parramatta station to Bankstown station
- 925: to East Hills via the Botanica Estate and Bankstown

Lidcombe station is served by three NightRide routes:

- N50: Liverpool station to Town Hall station
- N60: Fairfield station to Town Hall station
- N61: Carlingford station to Town Hall station

== Trackplan ==
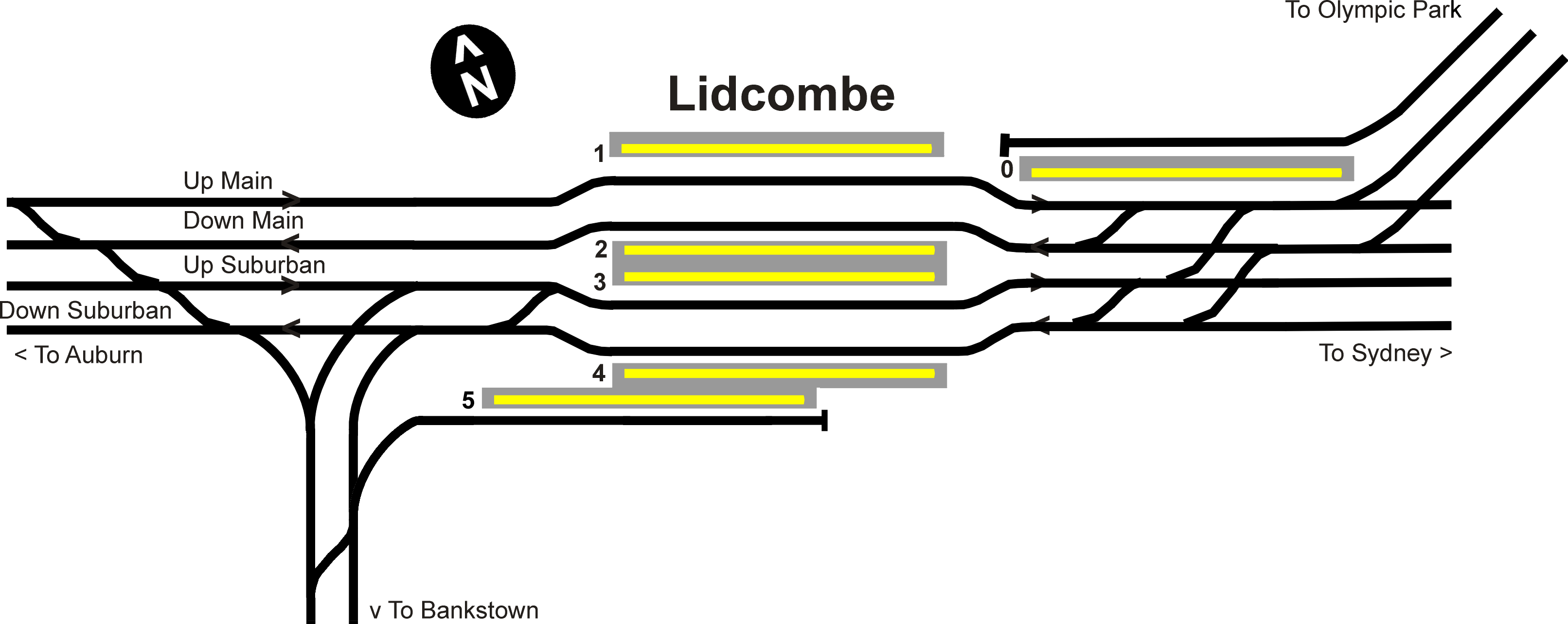
Track layout as of April 2015, subsequent to the CityRail Clearways Project completion

The Lidcombe Junction trackplan includes the Lidcombe Triangle Loop with a direct bi-directional track between Auburn and Berala. The Lidcombe Triangle Loop was previously used during trackwork as a diversion route for trains from the Western Line to utilise the Bankstown line to reach Central.
