= Bankstown railway station =

Railway station in Sydney, New South Wales

Bankstown
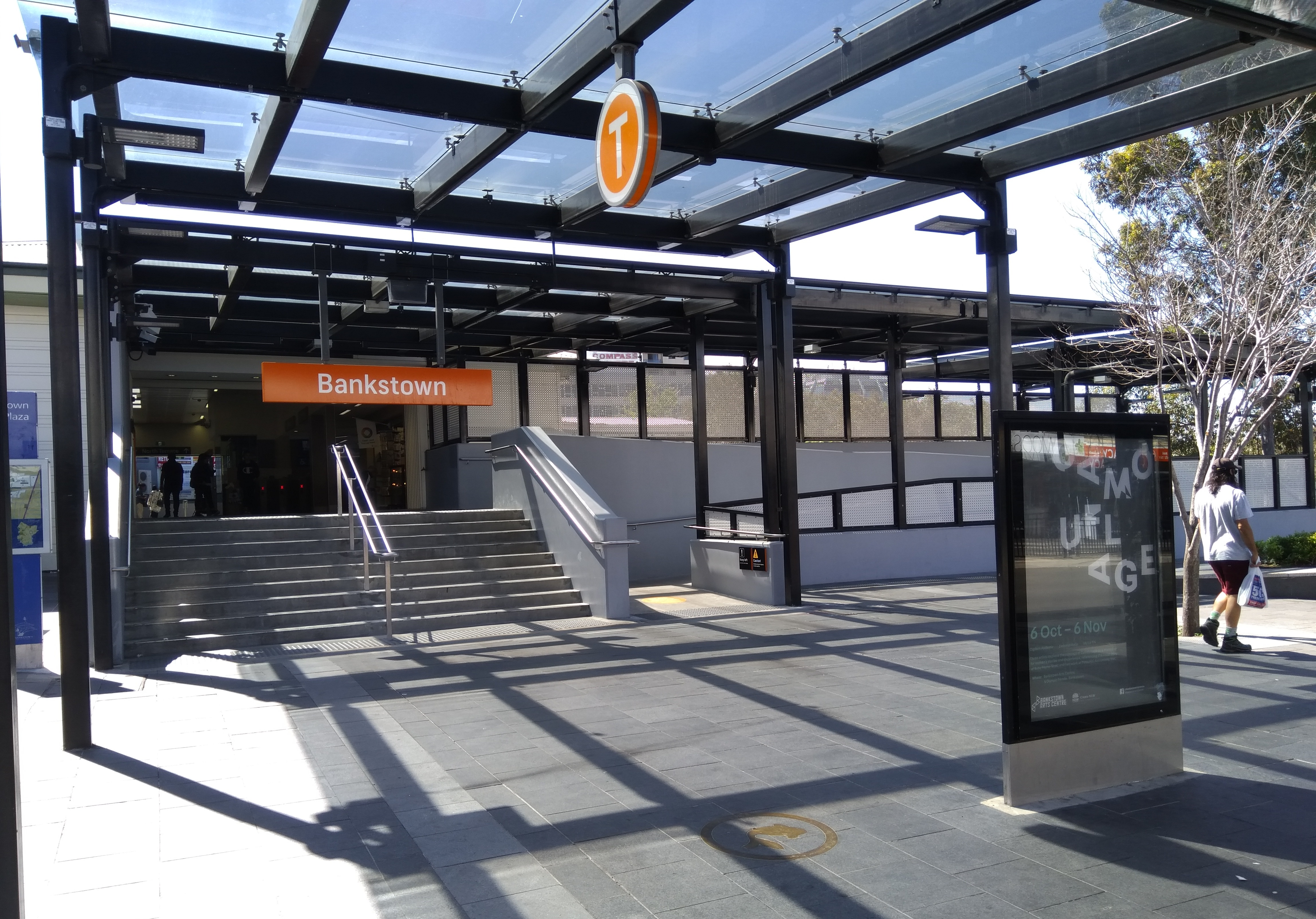
- Southern entrance, September 2018

General information
- Location: North Terrace, Bankstown; Australia
- Coordinates: 33°55′04″S 151°02′05″E
- Elevation: 30 metres (98 ft)
- Owner: Transport Asset Manager of New South Wales
- Operator: Sydney Trains; Metro Trains Sydney
- Lines: Bankstown; Metro North West & Bankstown
- Distance: 18.72 kilometres (11.63 mi) from Central
- Platforms: 2 (1 island)
- Tracks: 2
- Connections: Bus

Construction
- Structure type: Ground
- Accessible: Yes

Other information
- Status: Weekdays: Staffed: 24/7: Weekends and public holidays: Staffed: 24/7
- Station code: BWU
- Website: Transport for NSW

History
- Opened: 14 April 1909

Passengers
- 2025: 1,574,926 (year); 4,315 (daily) (Sydney Trains)
- Rank: 90

Services
Preceding station	Sydney Trains	Following station
Yagoona towards Lidcombe	T6 Lidcombe & Bankstown Line	Terminus
Preceding station	Sydney Metro	Following station
Terminus	M1 Metro North West & Bankstown Line	Punchbowl towards Tallawong
Former services
Preceding station	Sydney Trains	Following station
Yagoona towards Lidcombe or Liverpool	Bankstown Line (until 2024)	Punchbowl towards City Circle
Location

Bankstown railway station is a heritage-listed rapid transit and suburban railway station on the Bankstown and Metro North West & Bankstown lines in the Sydney suburb of Bankstown. It is the southern terminus of T6 Lidcombe & Bankstown services, and the southwestern terminus of M1 Metro North West & Bankstown services.

== History ==
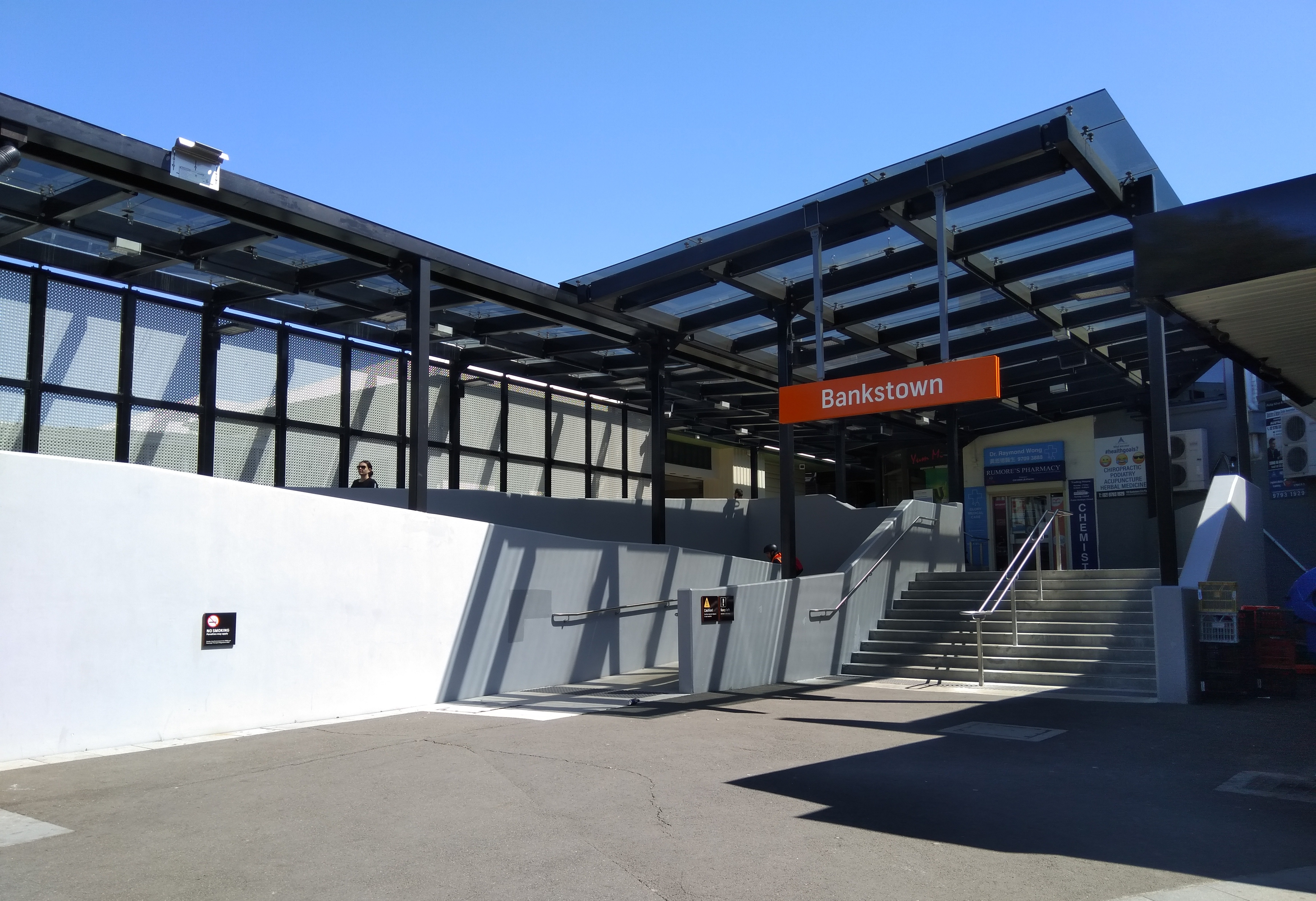
Northern entrance

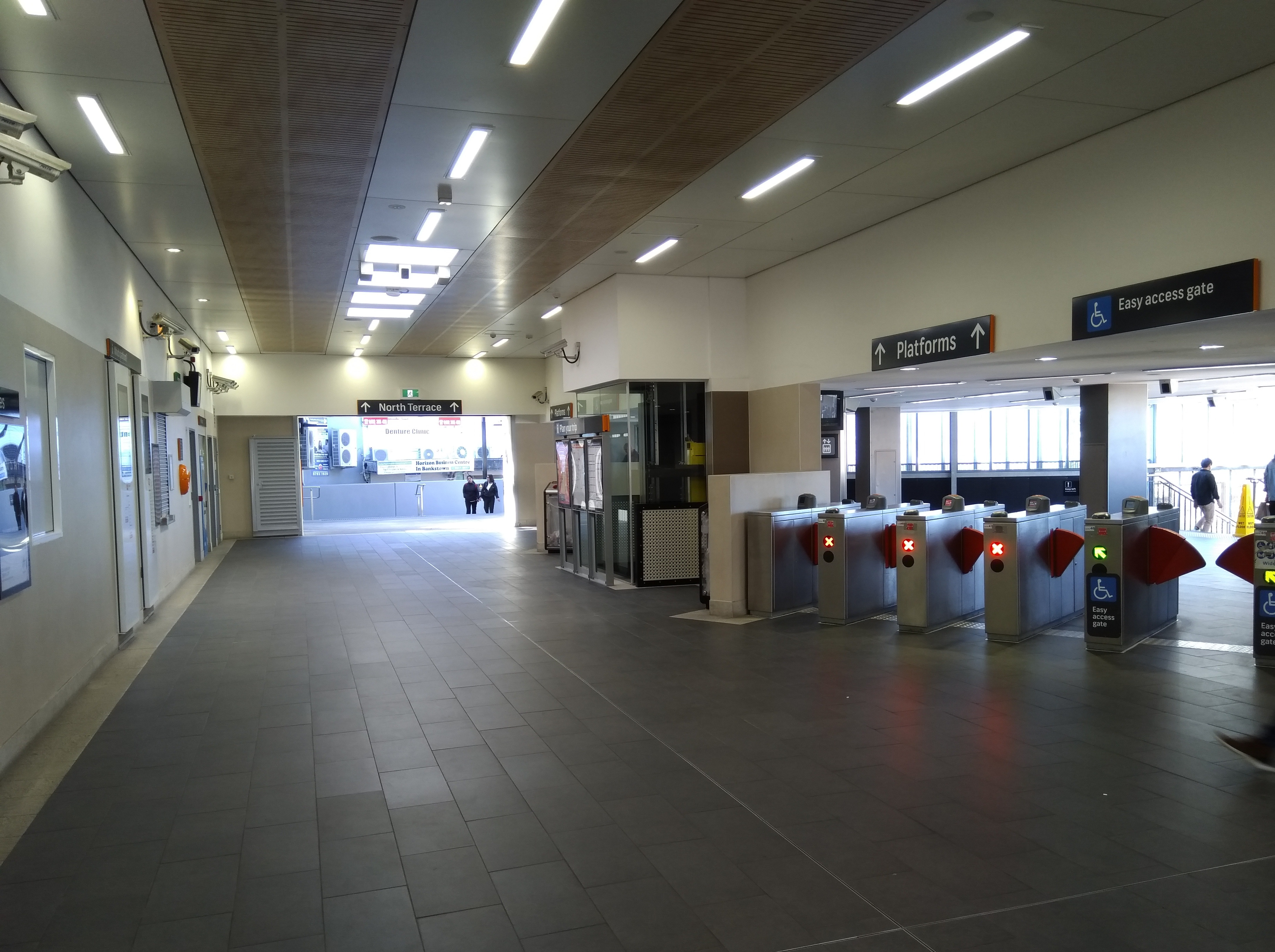
Concourse

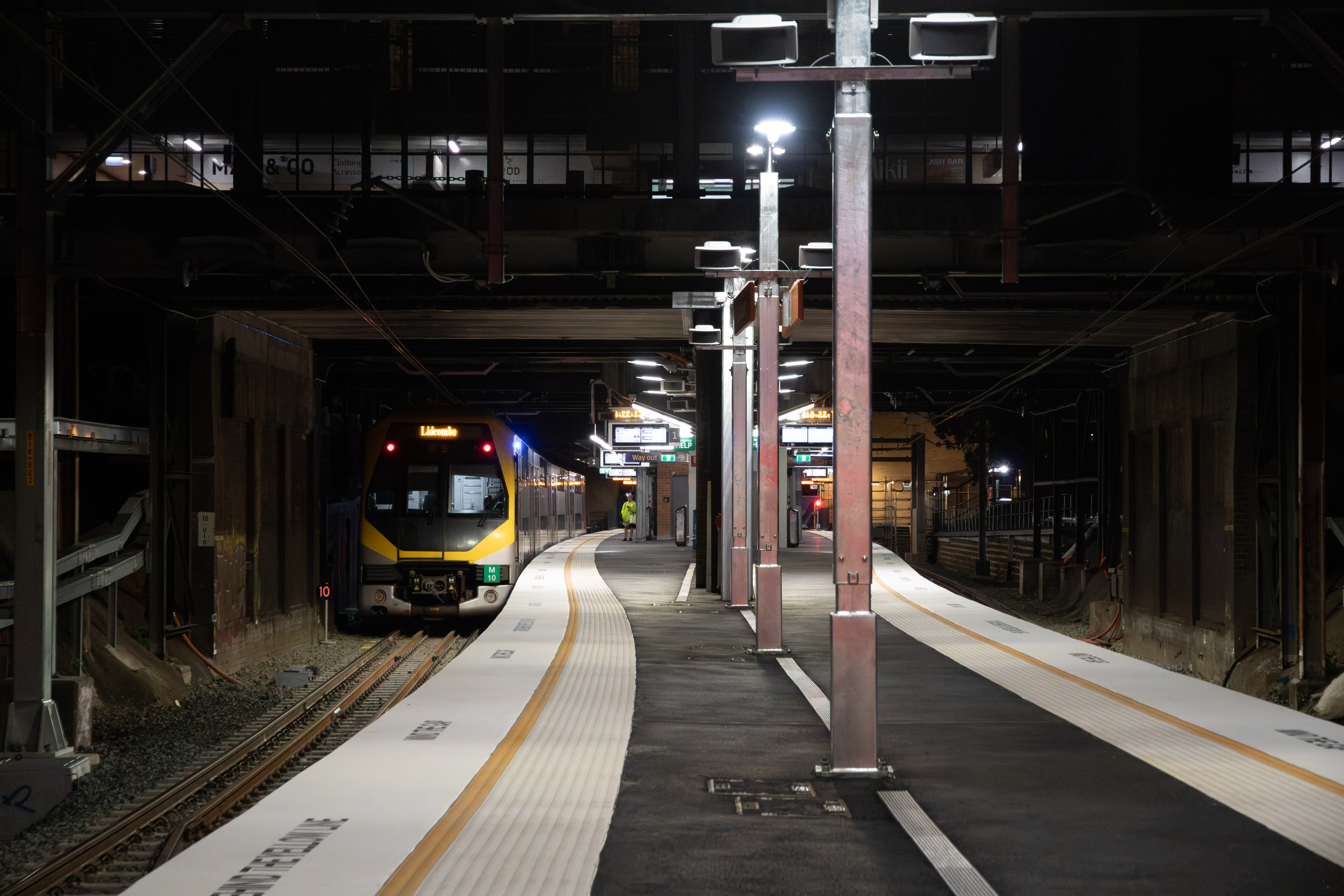
New extended platforms looking east, July 2025

Bankstown station opened on 14 April 1909, when the Bankstown line was extended from Belmore. It served as the terminus of the line until it was extended to Regents Park on the Main South line in 1928. Opposite platform 2 lies a parcel platform that was used by Electric Parcels Vans until 1966.

The station was upgraded in 1998 and received a lift to the platform and canopies.

In December 2013, planning approval was granted for an upgrade project including the installation of new stairs, ramps, canopies and ticket barriers. Work commenced in July 2014 and completed in 2015.

=== Sydney Metro City and Southwest ===
Transport for NSW extended the Sydney Metro to Bankstown, which opened on 30 October 2026. Before the extension opened, the line between Bankstown and Sydenham was closed, so that the nine intermediate stations could be converted for driverless Metro operation. Sydney Trains continues to run services between Bankstown station and the Main Southern railway line to the west.

As part of the project, Bankstown station was upgraded to have an additional at-grade station entrance at the eastern end of the existing platforms, which aligns with The Appian Way and Restwell Street. The new entrance provides access to Sydney Metro platforms, which was built east of the new entrance over the road connection between North and South Terraces. The existing station entrance was retained and the existing platforms were retained and extended westwards. The former parcels office, as well as a crossover at the eastern end of the station, were removed for construction.

== Platforms and services ==
Prior to the closure of the Bankstown line, services operated in a loop from the city via Sydenham to Bankstown, then on to Lidcombe, returning to the city via Strathfield and the Main Suburban line and vice versa. Alternate trains on the line were extended to Liverpool station and trains to Lidcombe no longer return via Strathfield. Further back, there were also limited services to Blacktown via a loop connection to the Main Western line near Lidcombe.

Services operated to Lidcombe and Liverpool on an alternate basis until 30 September 2024. To the west of the station, lies a headshunt to allow trains to terminate. This facility was only used by a few trains each night and during trackwork, as no trains were scheduled to terminate at Bankstown at other times. Since 19 October 2024, services consist of 4-car trains running a shuttle service known as the T6 Lidcombe & Bankstown Line to Lidcombe only, with 8-car services to commence in the future.

Platform	Line	Stopping pattern	Notes
1	T6 Lidcombe & Bankstown Line	Terminating services to & from Lidcombe	
2	T6 Lidcombe & Bankstown Line	Terminating services to & from Lidcombe	Limited services every day
3	M1 Metro North West & Bankstown Line	Terminating services to & from Tallawong	
4	M1 Metro North West & Bankstown Line	Terminating services to & from Tallawong	

== Transport links ==
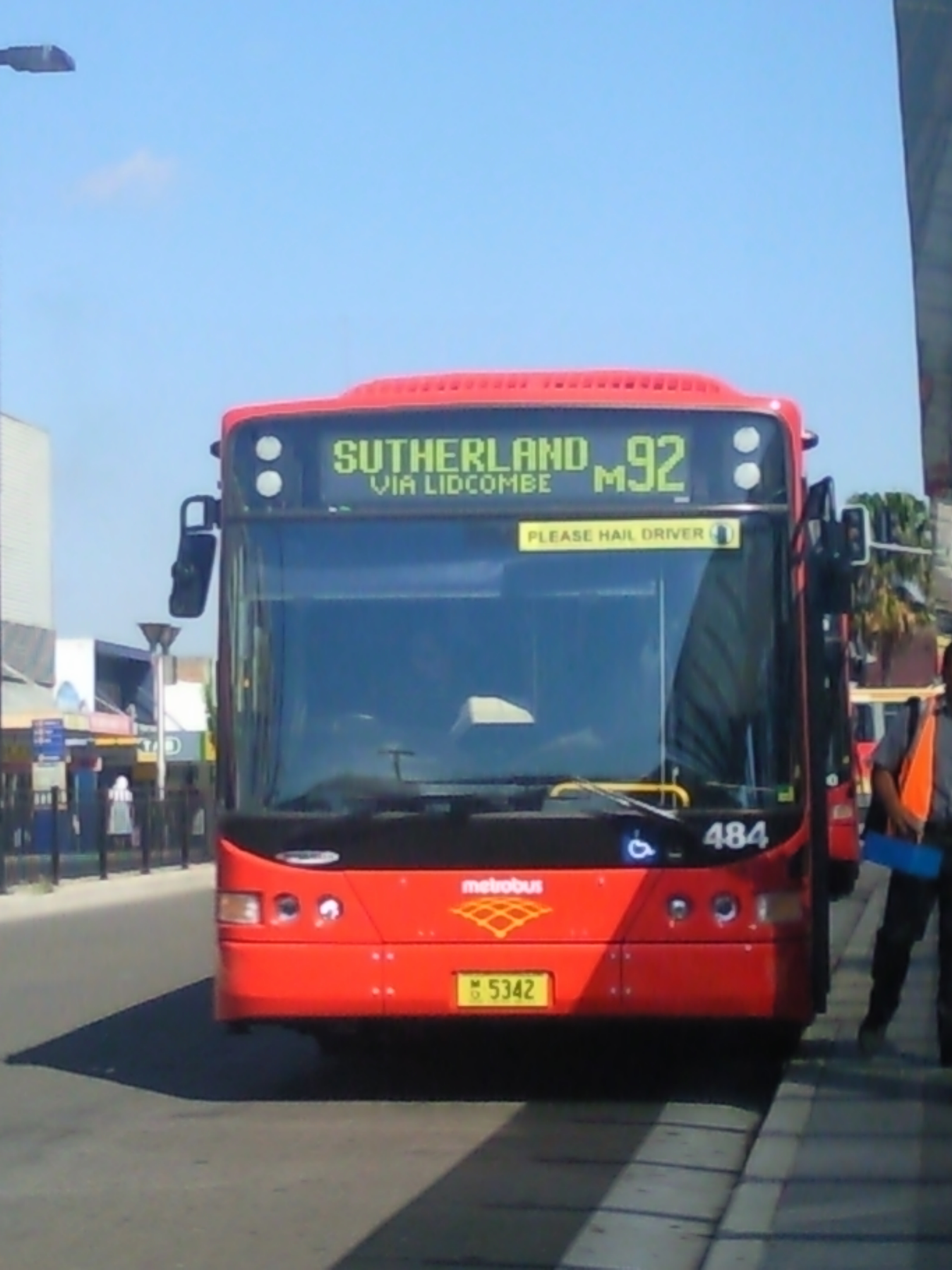
Transdev NSW Volgren bodied Volvo B7RLE in March 2011

Transit Systems operates ten bus routes via Bankstown station:

- 487: to Canterbury
- 905: to Fairfield station
- 907: to Parramatta station
- 908: to Merrylands station
- 909: to Parramatta station
- 911: to Auburn station
- 913: to Strathfield station
- 925: Lidcombe to East Hills
- M90: Liverpool station to Westfield Burwood
- M91: Parramatta station to Hurstville

U-Go Mobility operates 12 bus routes via Bankstown station:

- 920: to Parramatta station
- 922: to East Hills
- 923: to Panania
- 924: to East Hills
- 926: to Revesby Heights (to Padstow weekdays off peak only)
- 939: to Greenacre
- 940: to Hurstville station
- 941: to Hurstville station
- 944: to Mortdale
- 945: to Hurstville station
- 946: to HomeCo. Roselands
- 960: to Sutherland station

Bankstown station is served by one NightRide route:

- N40: East Hills station to Town Hall station
