= T6 Lidcombe & Bankstown Line =

Rail service in Sydney, New South Wales, Australia

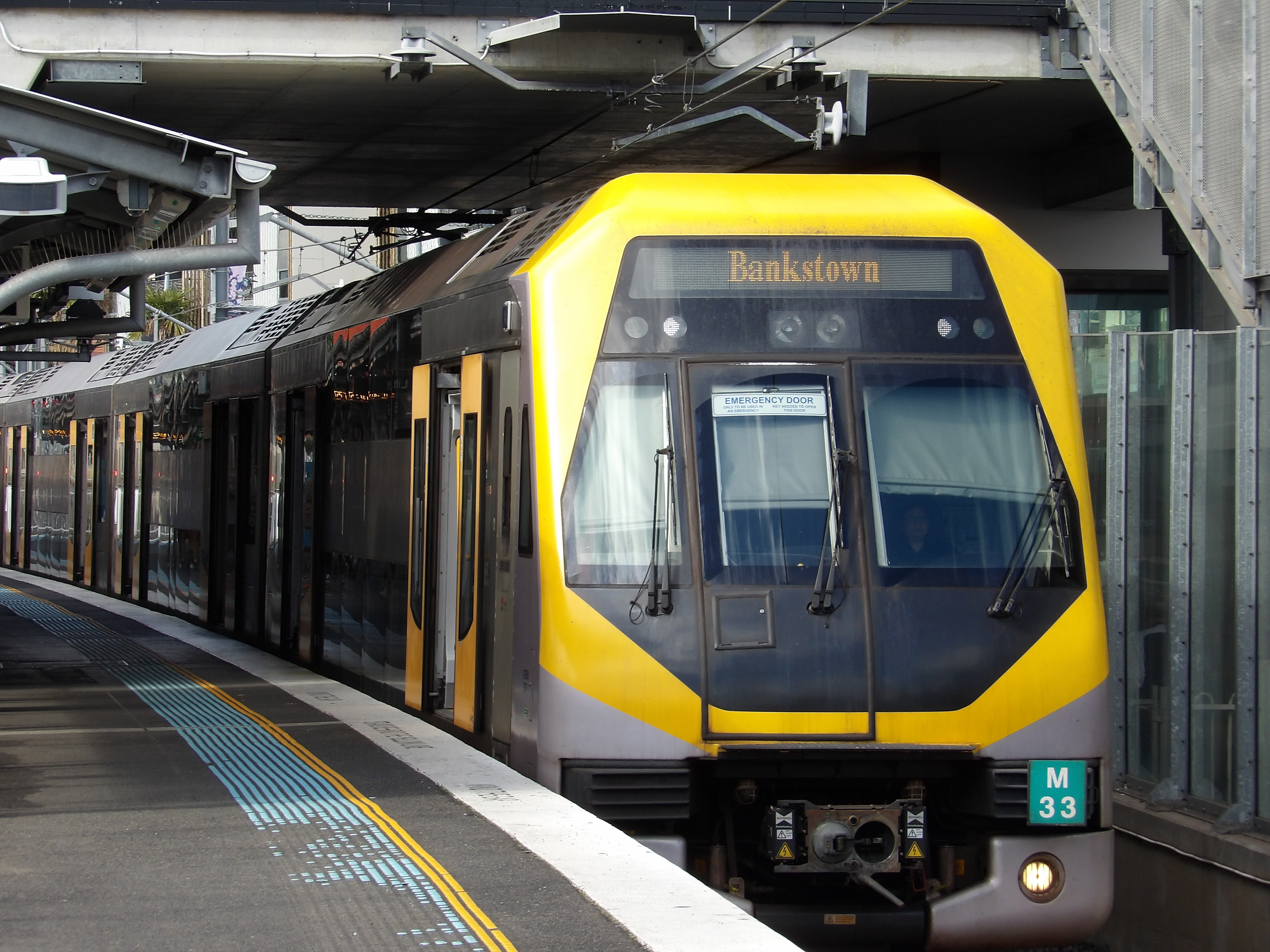
- An M set at Lidcombe

Overview
- Service type: Commuter rail service
- Locale: Sydney, New South Wales
- First service: 19 October 2024; 2 years ago
- Current operator: Sydney Trains

Route
- Termini: Lidcombe; Bankstown
- Stops: 6
- Lines used: Main Southern; Bankstown

On-board services
- Disabled access: Yes

Technical
- Rolling stock: M sets
- Track gauge: 1,435 mm (4 ft 8 1/2 in) standard gauge
- Timetable number: T6
Sydney rail network
Sydney Trains suburban services
T1 North Shore & Western
T2 Leppington & Inner West
T3 Liverpool & Inner West
T4 Eastern Suburbs & Illawarra
T5 Cumberland
T6 Lidcombe & Bankstown
T7 Olympic Park
T8 Airport & South
T9 Northern
Sydney Metro
M1 Metro North West & Bankstown

The T6 Lidcombe & Bankstown Line is a suburban rail service operated by Sydney Trains in Sydney, Australia. The service runs between Lidcombe and Bankstown via the Main Southern railway line and the Bankstown railway line.

Since 2024 the line has been numbered T6 and is coloured brown on maps and wayfinding information.

== History ==
=== Background ===
==== Early Regents Park services ====
The section of the Main Southern railway line used by Lidcombe & Bankstown Line services from Lidcombe to Regents Park opened in 1912 as a spur from the Main Suburban railway line. It became the Main Southern railway line when it was connected through to the Old Main South railway line at Cabramatta in 1924. In a precursor to the current Liverpool & Inner West Line services, this allowed passenger services to use this more direct deviation to reach Liverpool.

==== Early Bankstown services ====
Since the 1890s, the Bankstown railway line had been being built westward from the Illawarra railway line at Sydenham. In 1928, the Bankstown railway line reached the Main Southern railway line just south of Regents Park at Sefton Park Junction. Following completion of electrification in 1939, this allowed suburban passenger services to operate a large loop from the City Circle via the Main Suburban railway line, Lidcombe and Regents Park to Bankstown before returning to the City Circle via Sydenham, and vice versa. It also allowed services to begin from Liverpool or Lidcombe and reach the City Circle via Bankstown and Sydenham without using the Main Suburban railway line. Over time, this latter configuration became favoured, due to congestion on the Main Suburban railway line.

==== T3 Bankstown Line (2013–2024) ====
Following the 2011 state election, the newly elected O'Farrell government embarked on reform of transport in New South Wales, creating a new organisation, Transport for NSW, in November of that year. This was followed up with another government reform, which saw Sydney Trains take over operation of the Sydney suburban rail network from CityRail in July 2013.

Transport for NSW developed a new rail timetable and branding, which was put into effect on 20 October 2013. This saw the launch of T3 Bankstown Line services, which operated from the City Circle to Bankstown via Sydenham, then terminated at either Lidcombe or Liverpool.

The 2013 timetable was designed to integrate the projects of the Rail Clearways Program, a 2004 plan to divide the network's fourteen metropolitan rail lines into five independent "clearways" by installing extra tracks, passing loops, turnouts and turnbacks at pinch points around the network, such as at Homebush and Lidcombe. By 2013, the Rail Clearways Program was substantially complete.

T3 Bankstown Line services utilised the new turnback at Lidcombe, reducing bottlenecking on the Main Suburban railway line. However, the changes attracted criticism due to the increased number of interchanges and increased travel time for passengers from stations west of Bankstown.

=== T6 Lidcombe & Bankstown Line (from 2024) ===
==== Establishment ====
In 2020, Transport for NSW sought public feedback on how to service stations west of Bankstown from 2024 onwards, in preparation for the closure of the Bankstown railway line east of Bankstown as part of the Sydney Metro City & Southwest project. Three options were considered, these being:

- shuttle services from Lidcombe and Liverpool, both terminating at Bankstown
- a shuttle between Lidcombe and Bankstown, and through services from the City Circle to stations on the Main Southern railway line
- a shuttle between Liverpool and Bankstown, and through services from the City Circle to Bankstown via Birrong and Yagoona.

The second option was supported by 85% of respondents and preferred by Transport for NSW. However, the loss of direct service from the City Circle to Birrong and Yagoona concerned some local advocacy groups and representatives.

The planned closure of the Sydenham to Bankstown section of the Bankstown railway line occurred on 30 September 2024. Consequently, T3 Bankstown Line services were withdrawn, and in line with the consultation outcome two new services were introduced for the remaining Sydney Trains stations west of Bankstown, these being:

- T3 Liverpool & Inner West Line services, once again operating from the City Circle along the Main Suburban railway line to Lidcombe, then along the Main Southern railway line via Regents Park to terminate at Liverpool.
- T6 Lidcombe & Bankstown Line services, operating as a shuttle from Lidcombe along the Main Southern railway line to Regents Park, then along the Bankstown railway line via Birrong and Yagoona to terminate at Bankstown.

However, work to introduce the new T6 Lidcombe & Bankstown Line services was briefly delayed due to industrial action. After three weeks of bustitution, the new train service began in mid-October 2024.

==== Temporary closure for upgrades from April–June 2025 ====
The T6 Lidcombe & Bankstown Line temporarily ceased operations for 9 weeks from 27 April to 29 June 2025, with train services to Yagoona, Birrong and Bankstown replaced by fare-free replacement buses during this period. The closure allowed for further works on the split of Bankstown railway station as part of the Sydney Metro City & Southwest project. This involved a new track layout to re-enable operation of 8-car train services to both platforms, which were extended.

== Operation ==
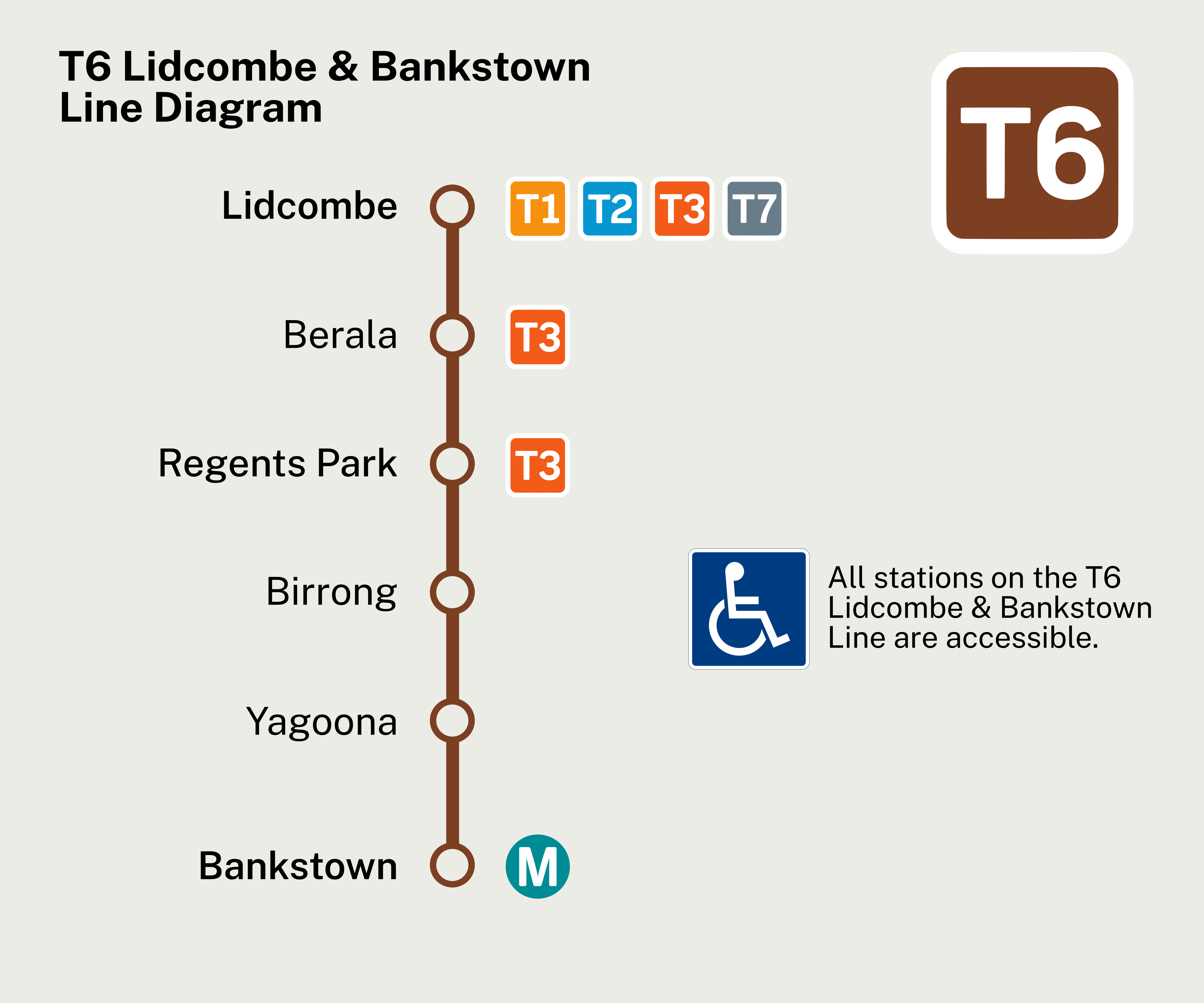
Shuttle services run only between Lidcombe and Bankstown.

=== Rolling stock ===
- New South Wales M set 4-car EMUs

=== Map ===
T6 interactive map

=== Route ===
T6 Lidcombe & Bankstown Line services begin at Lidcombe on the Main Suburban railway line. After leaving Lidcombe, T6 services use the Main Southern railway line to travel through Berala and Regents Park. South of Regents Park at Sefton Park Junction, T6 services branch off from the Main Southern, and use the Bankstown railway line via Birrong and Yagoona to complete their journey to Bankstown.

| Name | Distance from Central | Opened | Railway line | Serving suburbs | Other services |
|---|---|---|---|---|---|
| Lidcombe | 16.6 km | 1858 | Main Southern | Lidcombe | T1 North Shore & Western Line T2 Leppington & Inner West Line T3 Liverpool & Inner West Line Olympic Park railway line |
| Berala | 18.4 km | 1912 | Main Southern | Berala | T3 Liverpool & Inner West Line |
| Regents Park | 19.9 km | 1912 | Main Southern | Regents Park | T3 Liverpool & Inner West Line |
| Birrong | 22.1 km | 1928 | Bankstown | Birrong | none |
| Yagoona | 20.6 km | 1928 | Bankstown | Yagoona | none |
| Bankstown | 18.7 km | 1909 | Bankstown | Bankstown | M1 Metro North West & Bankstown Line |
