= Bankstown railway line =

Railway line in Sydney, New South Wales, Australia

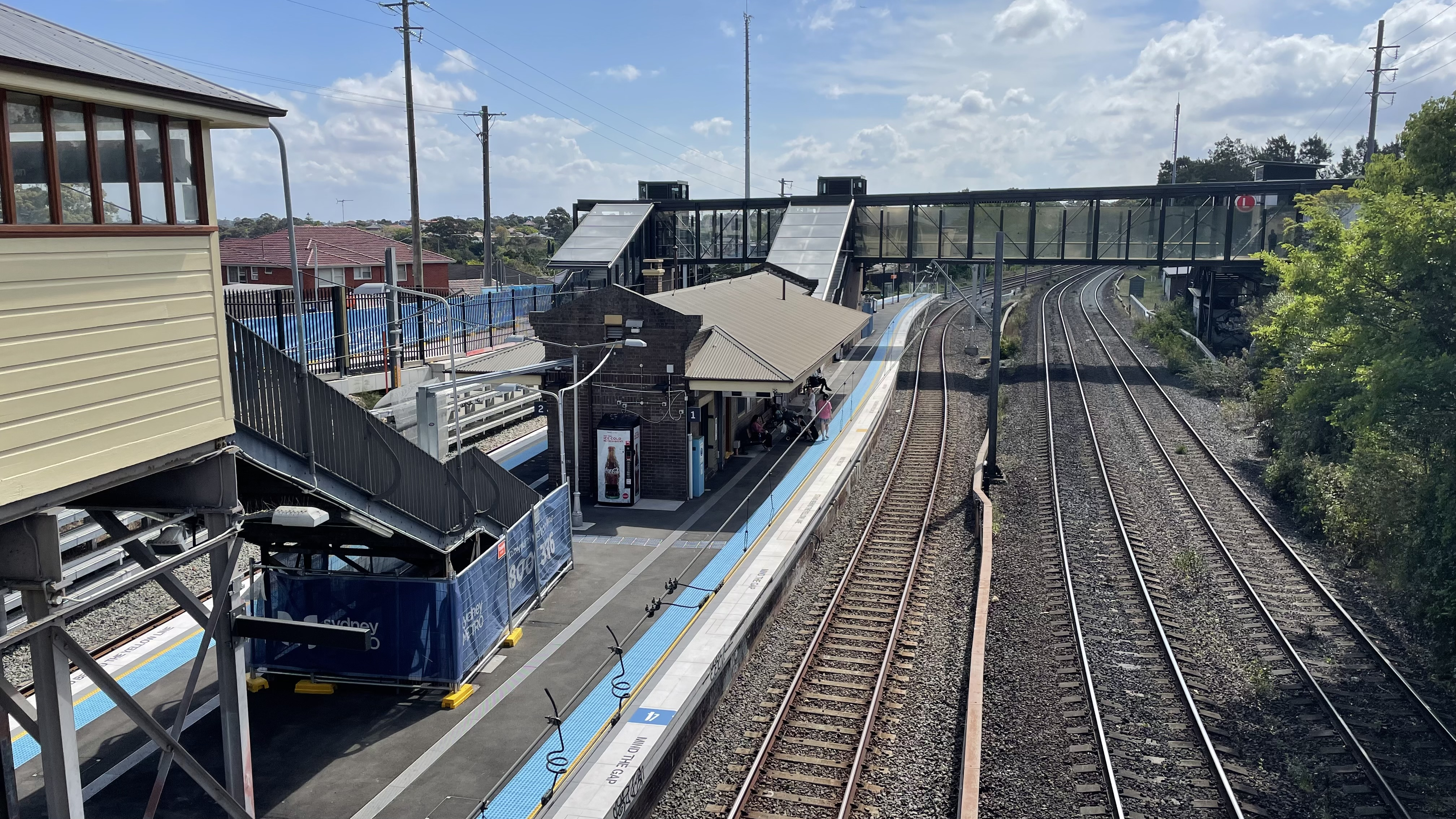
- Dulwich Hill railway station on the Bankstown railway line at left, with the parallel Metropolitan Goods railway line at right

Overview
- Status: Operational
- Owner: Transport Asset Manager of New South Wales
- Termini: Central; Sefton Park Junction
- Stations: 14

Service
- Services: M1 North West & Bankstown; T6 Lidcombe & Bankstown
- Operators: Metro Trains Sydney; Sydney Trains

History
- Opened to Belmore: 1 February 1895
- Extended to Bankstown: 14 April 1909
- Connected to Sefton Park Junction: 16 July 1928
- Sydenham–Bankstown conversion: 2024–2026

Technical
- Track gauge: 1,435 mm (4 ft 8 1/2 in)
- Electrification: 1,500 V DC overhead line

The Bankstown railway line is a suburban railway which traverses the Inner West and Canterbury–Bankstown areas of Sydney. East of Bankstown it is used by M1 Metro North West & Bankstown Line services, while west of Bankstown it is used by T6 Lidcombe & Bankstown Line services.

== Route ==
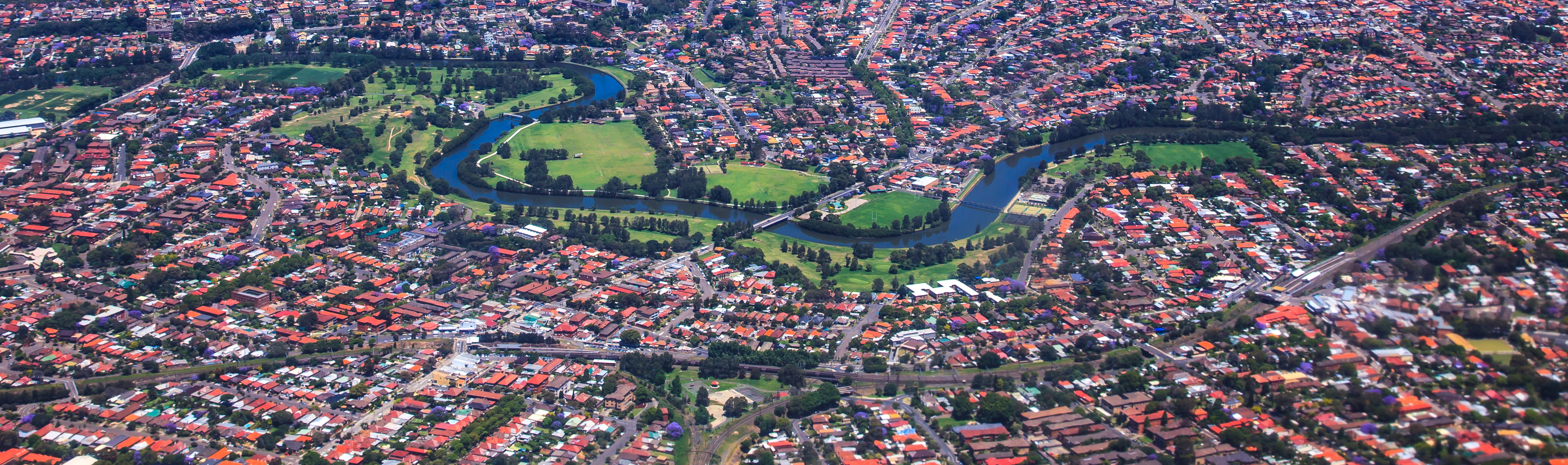
The line roughly parallels the Cooks River between Sydenham and Campsie

From Central, the Bankstown railway line now connects to Sydenham via Waterloo through tunnels built as part of the Sydney Metro City & Southwest project. From Sydenham the railway line continues westward along the valley of the Cooks River on its original surface alignment, parallel to the Metropolitan Goods railway line. At Dulwich Hill the line passes by the former Wardell Road Junction, where the terminus of L1 Dulwich Hill light rail services is now connected via an overbridge to the railway station.

Just past Canterbury, the line crosses to the southern side of the Cooks River. From here it passes through Campsie, after which the Metropolitan Goods railway line turns away from the Bankstown railway line towards Enfield Yard. Between Punchbowl and Bankstown is the former location of the Punchbowl Maintenance Depot, which has since been redeveloped for housing.

Bankstown is the keystone station on the line. Originally a through station, it has since been rebuilt into two abutting terminal stations, with M1 services operating eastward from it and T6 services operating north-westward.

Just west of Bankstown the line turns sharply northward, passing through Yagoona and Birrong to reach the western endpoint of the line at Sefton Park Junction. Here, it connects to the Main Southern railway line between Regents Park and Sefton.

== Services ==
The line has been used primarily for suburban passenger services since its opening. Though some freight services used the line earlier in its history, cargo traffic is now confined to the dedicated freight tracks of the parallel Metropolitan Goods railway line between Marrickville and Campsie.

=== Historic services ===
Former T3 interactive map. Stations in teal were converted to Sydney Metro.

Historically, the connection of the Bankstown railway line to other railway lines at each end allowed suburban passenger services to operate a large loop from the City Circle via the Main Suburban railway line, Lidcombe and Regents Park to Bankstown before returning to the City Circle via Sydenham and the Illawarra railway line, and vice versa. It also allowed services to begin from Liverpool or Lidcombe and reach the City Circle via Bankstown and Sydenham without using the Main Suburban railway line. This was the configuration in which Sydney Trains services most recently operated over the full length of the line, branded as the T3 Bankstown Line. This service was withdrawn on 30 September 2024.

=== Current services ===
Current services operating on the line consist of the M1 Metro North West & Bankstown Line and the T6 Lidcombe & Bankstown Line. Metro Trains Sydney has been operating M1 Metro North West & Bankstown Line services from Tallawong to Sydenham since August 2024, extending through to Bankstown since October 2026. Sydney Trains has been operating T6 Lidcombe & Bankstown services north-westward from Bankstown to Lidcombe since October 2024.

== History ==
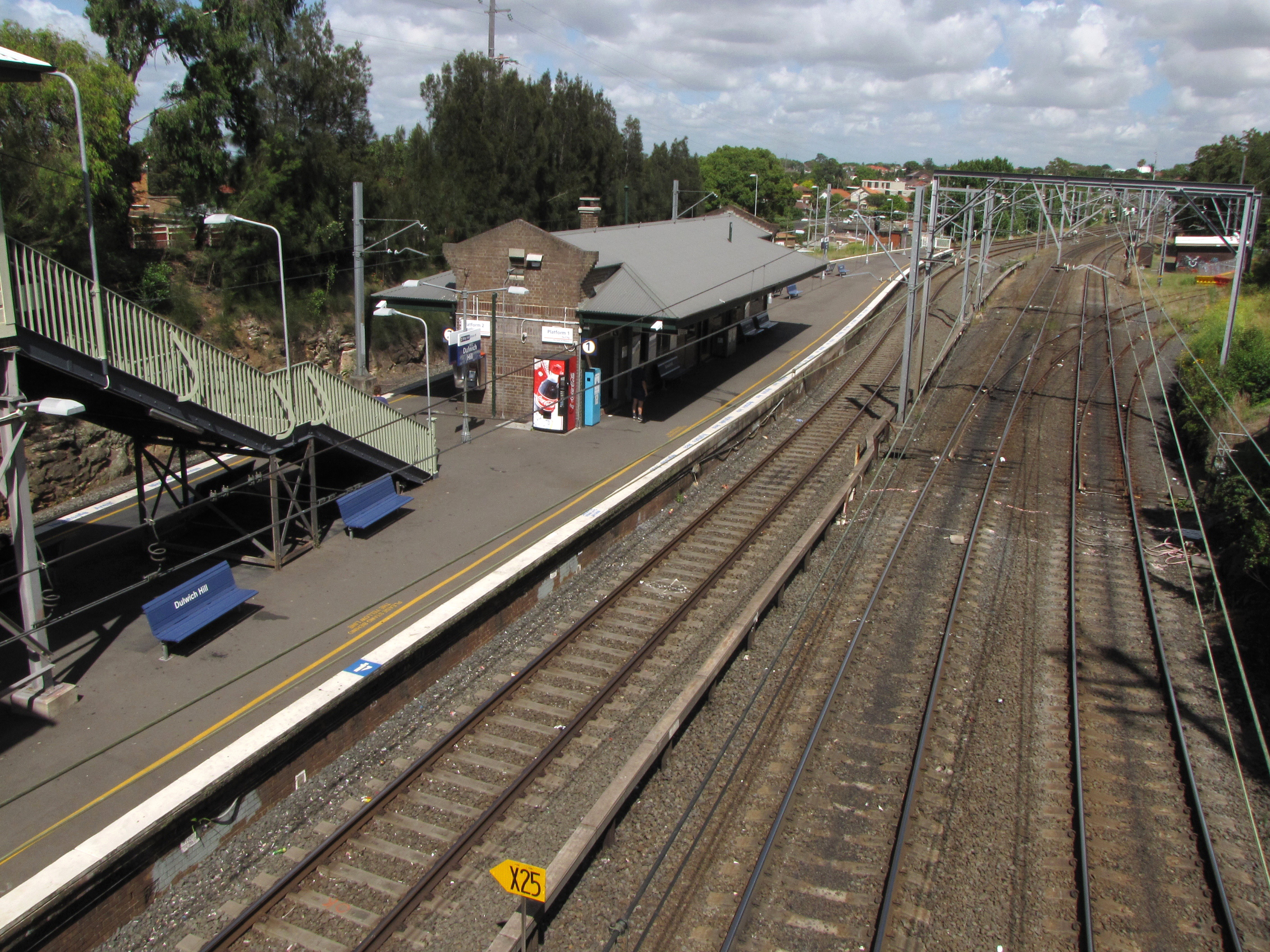
Dulwich Hill railway station on the Bankstown railway line, at left, in 2010. Parallel at right is the Metropolitan Goods railway line. The former Rozelle branch of the Metropolitan Goods railway line is at the top right; it has since been converted to light rail.

=== Branch to Belmore ===
The line opened on 1 February 1895, initially as a branch from the Illawarra railway line at Sydenham to Belmore. Railway authorities conceived of the line as an opportunity to alleviate pressure on the Old Main South railway line by providing an alternate route to Liverpool, and also to advance development of the intervening land. However, the 1890s depression constrained the development of the line.

=== Extension to Bankstown and the Main Southern railway line ===
Increased suburban development prompted the line to be extended to Bankstown on 14 April 1909, with intermediate stations at Lakemba and Punchbowl. In 1916, the Metropolitan Goods railway line was constructed, running parallel to the line between Marrickville to Campsie. On 16 July 1928, the line was extended from Bankstown to Sefton Park Junction, where it joined the Main Southern railway line between Regents Park and Sefton. This allowed trains to operate to Liverpool, or in a loop back toward the City Circle via Lidcombe and the Main Suburban railway line.

=== Electrification ===
In 1926, the line between Sydenham and Bankstown became the second in Sydney to be electrified. To service the new electric rolling stock, Punchbowl Maintenance Depot was built on the line just east of Bankstown. Electrification was extended from Bankstown to Regents Park in 1939. A new station between Lakemba and Punchbowl at Wiley Park opened on 19 June 1938. Punchbowl Maintenance Depot closed in 1994.

=== Upgrades in 2005–06 ===
In January 2006, a four-year project to upgrade the line was completed. The work included the re-sleepering of the entire line, replacing the former wooden sleepers with the more durable concrete ones, replacement and upgrade of the signalling, and also replacement of the ageing catenary, mostly with the more modern double contact wire variety. The lengthy upgrade process was noted for its "January Closedowns", in which the entire line was closed in January for the bulk of the upgrade work to take place.

=== Metro conversion Sydenham–Bankstown ===
Construction at Bankstown in October 2024

As part of the Sydney Metro City & Southwest project, the section of the railway line from Sydenham to Bankstown was converted to allow use by Sydney Metro services. This was intended to increase service capacity and alleviate network bottlenecks leading into the City Circle, by instead routing services from Bankstown to new metro tunnels at Sydenham. However, the project faced technical challenges in adapting curved platforms at century-old stations to unattended train operation, requiring installation of mechanical gap fillers at platform screen doors.

Planning approval for the conversion was granted in December 2018. Early works occurred during periodic suspensions of the Sydney Trains service over the subsequent years, until the first phase of the Sydney Metro City & Southwest project was completed to Sydenham in 2024. During an extended closure for major works and commissioning between September 2024 and October 2026, services to stations between Sydenham and Bankstown were replaced by buses, while truncated Sydney Trains services continued operating on the line west of Bankstown. All stations east of Bankstown reopened on 30 October 2026 when M1 Metro North West & Bankstown Line services began operating over the converted section.
