= Wahroonga Reservoir =

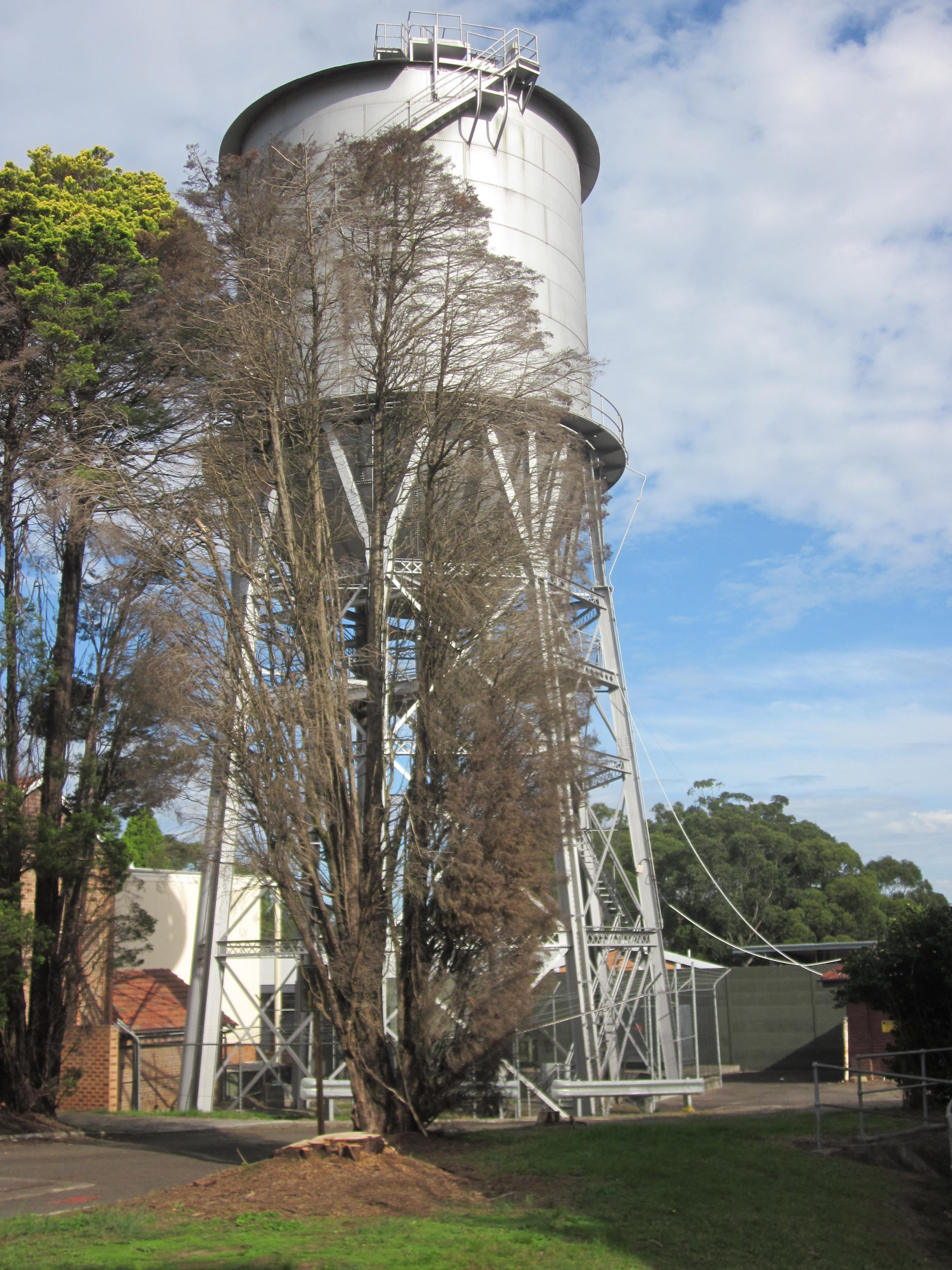
- Wahroonga Reservoir, 1678 Pacific Highway, Wahroonga

- Location within Sydney Location within Australia
- 33°43′09″S 151°06′51″E
- Location: 1678 Pacific Highway and Woonona Avenue, Wahroonga, Ku-ring-gai Council, New South Wales, Australia

History
- Built: 1915
- Built for: Metropolitan Board of Water Supply and Sewerage

Site notes
- Architect(s): Metropolitan Board of Water Supply and Sewerage
- Owner: Sydney Water

New South Wales Heritage Register
- Official name: Wahroonga Reservoir (Elevated) (WS 0124)
- Type: State heritage (built)
- Designated: 18 November 1999
- Reference no.: 1352
- Type: Water Supply Reservoir/Dam
- Category: Utilities – Water
- Builders: Metropolitan Board of Water Supply and Sewerage

The Wahroonga Reservoir is a heritage-listed reservoir located at 1678 Pacific Highway and Woonona Avenue in the Sydney suburb of Wahroonga in the Ku-ring-gai Council local government area of New South Wales, Australia. It was designed and built by the Metropolitan Board of Water Supply and Sewerage in 1915. It is also known as Wahroonga Reservoir (Elevated) (WS 0124). The property is owned by Sydney Water, a State-owned statutory corporation of the Government of New South Wales. It was added to the New South Wales State Heritage Register on 18 November 1999.

== History ==
=== Northern Suburbs supply ===
When the Board of Water Supply and Sewerage took over from Sydney City Council in 1888, the only supply to the northern suburbs was by a submarine main from Dawes Point to Milsons Point, taking water by gravitation from Paddington Reservoir. The level of Paddington Reservoir limited supply to the lower areas of Northern Suburbs.

In 1888, in order to overcome this problem, the Board erected a pumping station in Junction Street, North Sydney, with two storage tanks in the grounds of St. Thomas' Church, to meet demand for the higher parts of North Sydney. The plant was dismantled in 1892, the pump being transferred to Carlton and the tanks to Wahroonga (not extant). The above submarine main was abandoned in 1917.

In 1892 the Ryde Pumping Station was commissioned, supplied by mains from Potts Hill (via Rookwood Cemetery, along the Concord Peninsula and attached to the 1889 railway bridge at Meadowbank), with reservoirs at Ryde Pumping Station (disused 1930) and Ryde Hill and then by mains to a pair of reservoirs at Chatswood (previously constructed in 1888).

With increasing population of the North Shore, brought about by the construction of the railway, new storage reservoirs were required. The tanks, originally at North Sydney, were transferred to Wahroonga in 1896. A steam powered pumping station was erected at Chatswood in 1895 for the supply of Wahroonga. A new steel surface reservoir was constructed at Wahroonga in 1898 (Wahroonga Reservoir No. 1 WS 123).

From Wahroonga the main from Chatswood extended to Hornsby, with a branch to Thornleigh and Beecroft.

The mains from Chatswood to Wahroonga had deteriorated by 1905, necessitating new direct mains from Ryde to Wahroonga, and from Chatswood to Pymble to connect to former. Wahroonga Reservoir (Elevated) WS 0124 was erected in 1915.

A main to Mobbs Hill was constructed in 1916. It was extended to Beecroft and Wahroonga in 1918, superseding the Ryde Wahroonga Main which was now too small.

A Pumping Station was erected at Wahroonga for the elevated tank (Wahroonga Reservoir (Elevated) WS 124 in 1935. New mains were constructed from Ryde to Wahroonga in 1937 for the new reservoir (Wahroonga Reservoir No. 3 WS 125), with connection to Pymble.

== Description ==
The Reservoir (Elevated) WS 124), situated at 1678 Pacific Highway, is an unusual and unique reservoir in the Sydney Water Supply System. It has a cylindrical elevated riveted steel tank, with an original roof and a spherical or rounded base, all constructed in riveted steel plate. The reservoir is supported on an eight legged, H section, steel girder riveted frame, with horizontal and diagonal bracing. The top of the reservoir is reached by a stairway up the inside of the frame, with a walkway at the top of the frame (attached by triangular riveted plates) and a stairway to the roof of the reservoir. The whole structure is a fine example of riveted steel design and technology, surviving intact for more than 85 years. It is a prominent local landmark. Standard features include: davit, trigonometric station, access stairway, handrails and inlet and outlet valve chambers. Adjacent to the reservoir is a storage tank constructed with riveted steel plates.

Directly opposite the site containing Reservoir (Elevated) WS 124, on the corner of Woonona Avenue and the Pacific Highway, is a large building with high brick walls, the "Woonona Avenue" site referred to in the heritage document. No indication of its purpose is given on the outside of the building. It probably houses the "pumping station" referred to in the History section, above.

Significant plantings at 1678 Pacific Highway include: cypress, jacaranda and Illawarra flame tree.

The full service level is 237 metres (778 ft) and the capacity of the reservoir is 1.1 megalitres (39×10^{3} cu ft).

=== Modifications and dates ===
The reservoir is in good condition and intact.

== Heritage listing ==
As at 7 September 2016, Wahroonga Reservoir (Elevated) WS 124 is an unusual and unique reservoir in the Sydney Water Supply System. The whole structure is a fine example of riveted steel design and technology, surviving intact. It is a distinct local landmark. The reservoirs at Wahroonga demonstrate the variety of reservoir construction techniques used by the MWS & DB, the engineering expertise available to the Board as well as the growth in demand in the Northern Suburbs from 1898 onwards, now more than 100 years of growth. Wahroonga reservoirs have played a major role in the supply of water to the Northern Suburbs.

Wahroonga Reservoir was listed on the New South Wales State Heritage Register on 18 November 1999 having satisfied the following criteria.

The place is important in demonstrating the course, or pattern, of cultural or natural history in New South Wales.

The reservoirs at Wahroonga demonstrate the growth in demand in the Northern Suburbs from 1898 onwards, now more than 100 years of growth. Wahroonga reservoirs have played a major role in the supply of water to the Northern Suburbs.

The place is important in demonstrating aesthetic characteristics and/or a high degree of creative or technical achievement in New South Wales.

The reservoirs at Wahroonga demonstrate the variety of reservoir construction techniques used by the MWS & DB, the engineering expertise available to the Board. They are a prominent landmark in the area.

The place has potential to yield information that will contribute to an understanding of the cultural or natural history of New South Wales.

The design and construction of this reservoir are not repeated in the Sydney Water system.

The place possesses uncommon, rare or endangered aspects of the cultural or natural history of New South Wales.

This reservoir is unique in the Sydney Water Supply Area, with its riveted cylindrical tank and riveted steel girder stand.

== See also ==
- Media related to Wahroonga Reservoir at Wikimedia Commons
- List of reservoirs and dams in New South Wales
- Sydney Water
