= Chatswood Reservoirs No. 1 and No. 2 =

Two reservoirs in New South Wales, Australia

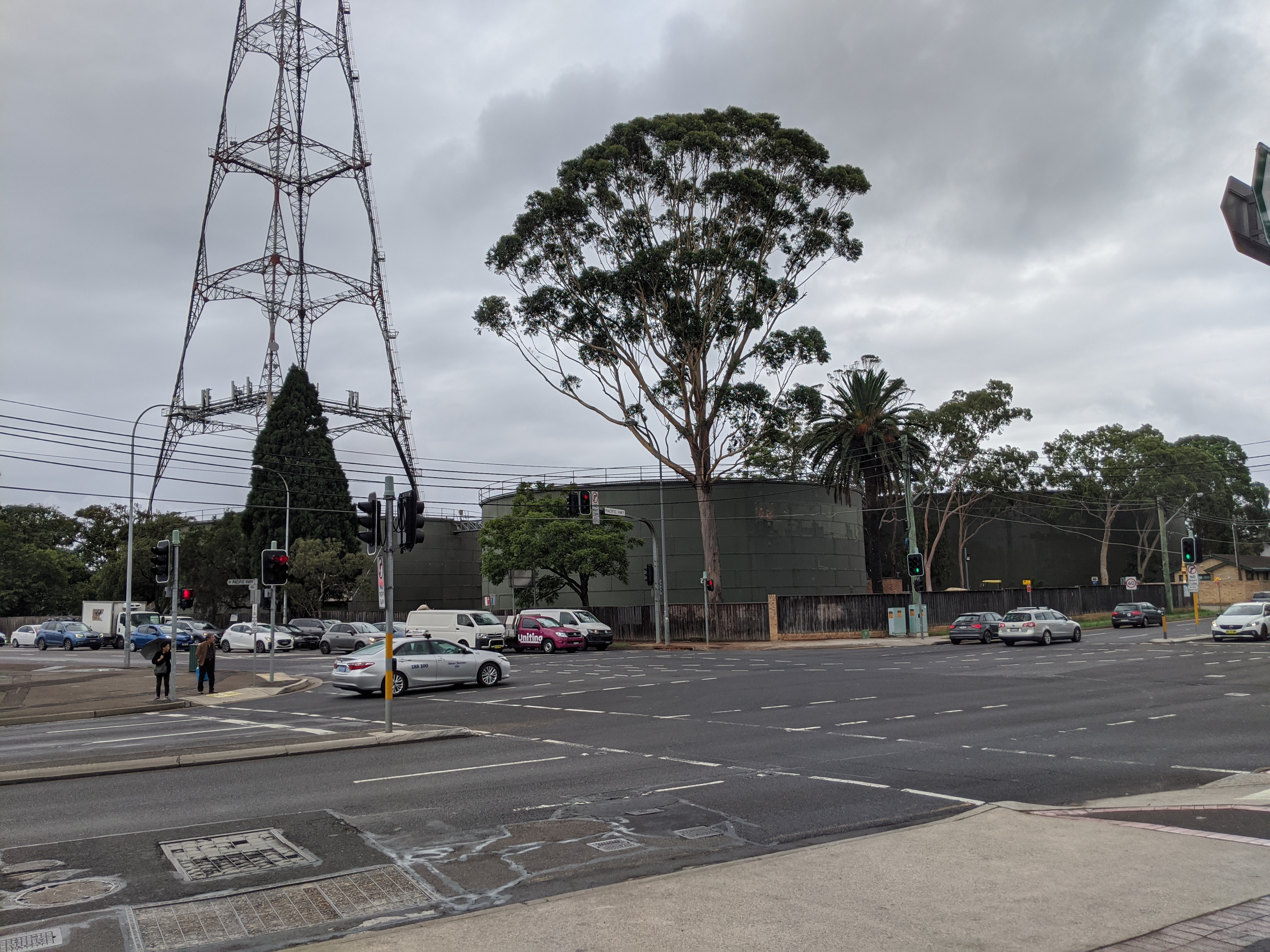
- Chatswood Reservoirs No. 1 and No. 2, 559 Pacific Hwy, Artarmon, NSW

- Location within Sydney Location within Australia
- 33°48′21″S 151°10′49″E
- Location: 559 Pacific Highway, Artarmon, City of Willoughby, New South Wales, Australia

History
- Built: 1888

Site notes
- Architect: NSW Public Works Department
- Owner: Sydney Water

New South Wales Heritage Register
- Official name: Chatswood Reservoirs No. 1 and No. 2; WS024 & WS025
- Type: State heritage (built)
- Designated: 18 November 1999
- Reference no.: 1321
- Type: Water Supply Reservoir/ Dam
- Category: Utilities - Water
- Builders: Public Works Department

Chatswood Reservoirs No. 1 and No. 2 are two heritage-listed reservoirs located at 559 Pacific Highway in the Sydney suburb of Artarmon, New South Wales, Australia. They were designed and built by the NSW Public Works Department. They are also known as WS024 & WS025 respectively. The reservoirs are owned by Sydney Water, a State-owned statutory corporation of the Government of New South Wales. The reservoirs were added to the New South Wales State Heritage Register on 18 November 1999.

== History ==
The need for supplying water to the districts surrounding the railway along the North Shore line was met by the Upper Nepean Scheme. Water was conveyed to the North Shore via the Upper Canal and distributed from Pipehead. The basin at Pipehead was used to supply suction water to a major new steam pumping station built at Ryde (the forebear of the current Ryde Pumping Station) which pumped water to the two reservoirs WS024 and WS025 at Chatswood. Built in 1888, these reservoirs were a key component in the supply of water to the Chatswood area. As their top water level was 113 metres (371 ft) above sea level, the pair were able to service the suburbs of Chatswood, North Sydney, Mosman, and a small portion of Ryde by gravity. Supply to Manly could also be obtained from the reservoirs by means of gravitation through Mosman reservoir after it was built in 1904. The reservoirs also supplied suction water to a steam pumping station, constructed adjacent to them in 1895. This was pumped to two 90-kilolitre (3,200 cu ft) elevated steel tanks at Wahroonga for supply to the Upper North Shore. In 1972, a 54-megalitre (1.9×10^{6} cu ft) welded steel reservoir was constructed adjacent to R024 and R025.

== Description ==
Chatswood Reservoir No.1 (WS24) (west) is identical in construction to Chatswood Reservoir No.2 (WS25) (east). They were built as a pair of cylindrical riveted steel surface reservoirs, with interconnecting walkway at roof level. Standard features include: concrete apron, davit, access ladder, handrails and inlet and outlet valve chambers. An unusual feature is the set of ladder rungs attached to the side of the reservoir, although they have been cut off at low level. The depth gauge board has been removed. The site also includes a meter house (not significant) between Chatswood Reservoirs Nos. 1 & 2, a welded steel reservoir (WS239) (little or no significance, although included in the NTA listing) at the south end of the site and the former Chatswood Pumping Station, a two-storey brick structure (1895). Significant plantings include: archontophoenix and other palm species, camphor laurel and eucalypts.

=== Modifications and dates ===
The reservoir has been roofed to safeguard water quality (1960s-1970s). An unusual feature is the set of ladder rungs attached to the side of the reservoir, although they have been cut off at low level. The depth gauge board has been removed.

== Heritage listing ==
As at 27 April 2005, Chatswood Reservoir No.1 (WS24) and Chatswood Reservoir No.2 (WS25) are a pair of identical riveted steel reservoirs, built at Chatswood in 1888. Riveted steel reservoirs are rare in the Sydney Supply Area, this being one of the finest and earliest groups.

Chatswood Reservoirs No. 1 and No. 2 was listed on the New South Wales State Heritage Register on 18 November 1999 having satisfied the following criteria.

The place is important in demonstrating the course, or pattern, of cultural or natural history in New South Wales.

Chatswood Reservoir No.1 (WS24) and Chatswood Reservoir No.2 (WS25) are of a pair of riveted steel reservoirs, built at Chatswood in 1888.

The place is important in demonstrating aesthetic characteristics and/or a high degree of creative or technical achievement in New South Wales.

The two riveted steel reservoirs form a complementary group, rarely seen elsewhere. The other major example is Hermitage Reservoir No.1 (WS50) and Hermitage Reservoir No.2. (WS51)

The place possesses uncommon, rare or endangered aspects of the cultural or natural history of New South Wales.

Riveted steel reservoirs are rare in the Sydney Supply Area, this being one of the finest and earliest groups.

== See also ==
- List of reservoirs and dams in New South Wales
- Sydney Water
