= Regents Park, New South Wales =

Suburb of Sydney, Australia

Regents Park
- Suburb
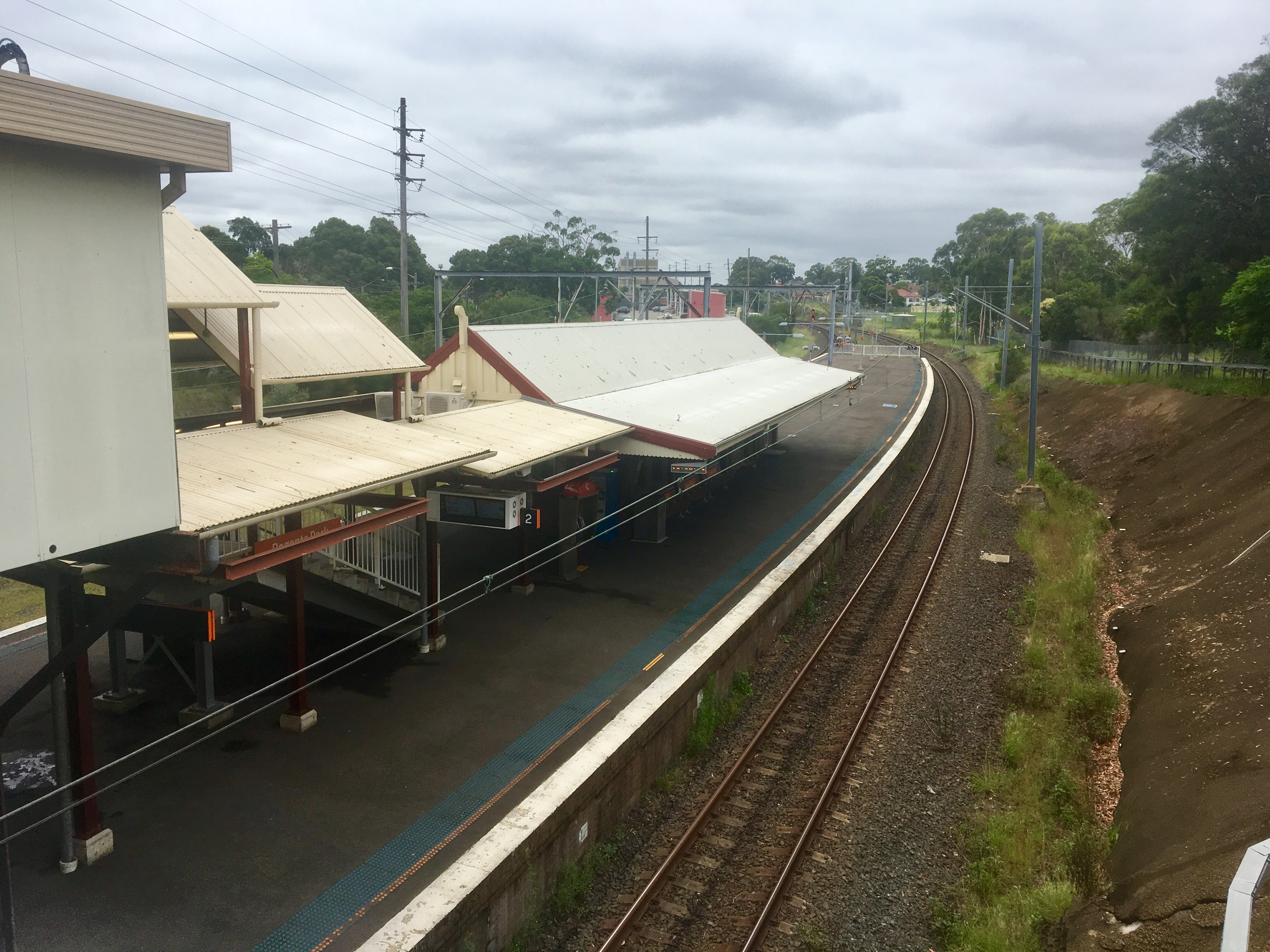
- Regents Park 2019

- Interactive map of Regents Park
- Country: Australia
- State: New South Wales
- City: Sydney
- LGAs: City of Canterbury-Bankstown; Cumberland Council
- Location: 22 km (14 mi) west of Sydney CBD

Government
  - State electorates: Bankstown; Auburn
  - Federal division: Blaxland
- Elevation: 38 m (125 ft)

Population
  - Total: 4,990 (2021 census)
- Postcode: 2143
Suburbs around Regents Park
Auburn	Berala	Berala
Sefton	Regents Park	Lidcombe
Birrong	Potts Hill	Chullora

Regents Park is a suburb in western Sydney, in the state of New South Wales, Australia. Regents Park is located 22 kilometres west of the Sydney central business district, in the local government area of Cumberland Council and City of Canterbury-Bankstown.

Regents Park shares the postcode of 2143 with neighbouring suburbs Birrong and Potts Hill.

== History ==
The suburb took its name from a local property built by Mr Peck and Mr Johnson in 1879, which they had named after Regent's Park, in the north-west of London, United Kingdom.

=== European Settlement ===
The area was originally part of a land grant to Joseph Hyde Potts and the first subdivision was made in 1880. When the school opened in 1899 it was known as Potts Hill School, but became Sefton Park School in 1907 when this area became known as Sefton Park. In 1929, it was changed to Regent Park School. The railway station opened in 1914 as Regents Park but the site was changed in 1924 when the line connected Lidcombe to Bankstown.

== Transport ==
Regents Park railway station is on the Main Southern railway line.

== Education ==
- Regents Park Public School
- Regents Park Christian School
- Trinity Catholic College Regents Park Campus
- St Peter Chanel Catholic Primary School
- Karningul School
- Regents Park Preschool Long Day Care
- Al-Bayan Institute (Arabic School and normal school)
- Sydney Construction Training School

== Sport ==
The Regents Park Saints Football Club are a junior football club that plays in the Granville & District Soccer Football Association. The club's colours are maroon and yellow, and their home ground is Princes Park.

== Local Government Area ==
The heritage-listed system of triple main water pipelines connecting Pipehead in Guildford with Potts Hill Reservoir (also known locally as 'The Pipelines') is the demarcation line between Cumberland and Canterbury-Bankstown Councils. While the majority of the suburb falls within the local government area of Cumberland Council, the part of the suburb which lies south-west of the Pipehead-Potts Hill pipelines falls within the City of Canterbury-Bankstown. Regents Park is in the federal electoral division of Blaxland, currently held by Jason Clare, of the Australian Labor Party.

For NSW state elections, Regents Park is predominantly in the state electoral district of Auburn. This seat is currently held by Lynda Voltz.

== Demographics ==
Data from the 2021 census reveals that Regents Park has a population of 4,990. Of this population:

- 51.5% are male and 48.5% are female, with the median age being 36.
- The top responses for ancestry were Chinese (24.0%), English (10.0%), Australian (8.8%), Lebanese (7.9%) and Vietnamese (7.9%).
- The top responses for country of birth other than Australia (41.3%), were China (9.9%), Vietnam (8.8%), Lebanon (3.3%), Pakistan (2.7%) and Philippines (2.7%).
- 25.2% of people only speak English at home, with 75.4% of people speaking a non-English language at home. The top responses for non-English languages spoken at home were Arabic (11.7%), Mandarin (10.5%), Cantonese (9.4%), Vietnamese (7.1%) and Urdu (3.6%).
- Regarding religious affiliation, the top responses were Islam (23.5%), No Religion (19.6%), Catholic (19.2%) and Buddhism (9.9%).

== Notable people ==
Peter Skrzynecki – Australian Poet, who grew up in Regents Park. Notable works include 'Feliks Skrzynecki', based on his father, 'Regents Park' and '10 Mary Street'.
