= Potts Hill railway line =

Former railway line in Sydney, New South Wales, Australia

Overview
- Owner: Metropolitan Water, Sewerage and Drainage Board
- Locale: Sydney, Australia

Service
- Operator(s): Department of Railways

History
- Opened: 11 November 1912
- Closed: 27 April 1966

Technical
- Line length: 1.0 kilometre
- Track gauge: 1,435 mm (4 ft 8 1/2 in) standard gauge

The Potts Hill railway line was a short branch line serving the pumping station at the Potts Hill Reservoirs in the Sydney suburb of Potts Hill. It was owned by the Metropolitan Water, Sewerage and Drainage Board and carried passenger trains. After closure, the tracks were lifted.

== Line description ==
The branch left the Main South line at a junction just north of Regents Park station. It proceeded south, crossing Amy Street, afterwards heading south-east at the end of Regents Park Hotel. After following the water supply channel, it crossed over the Enfield goods lines and terminated at a loop at the Potts Hill pumping station.

== History ==
The Water Board supported the construction of a railway line for the purposes of supporting its Potts Hill works and to open the area to settlement. The line was completed in July 1912 with funding from the Water Board, and the first passenger service operated by New South Wales Government Railways ran on 11 November 1912. The No 2 Reservoir Construction Line which branched off the Potts Hill line opened in 1916. The Potts Hill line was later reconstructed to eliminate level crossings as part of construction between Regents Park and Cabramatta.

The last train on Potts Hill branch ran in 1965. It closed on 27 April 1966. Rails from Potts Hill were removed to the Sydney Tramway Museum in Loftus.

== See also ==
- Potts Hill Reservoirs 1 & 2
