= Pressure Tunnel and Shafts =

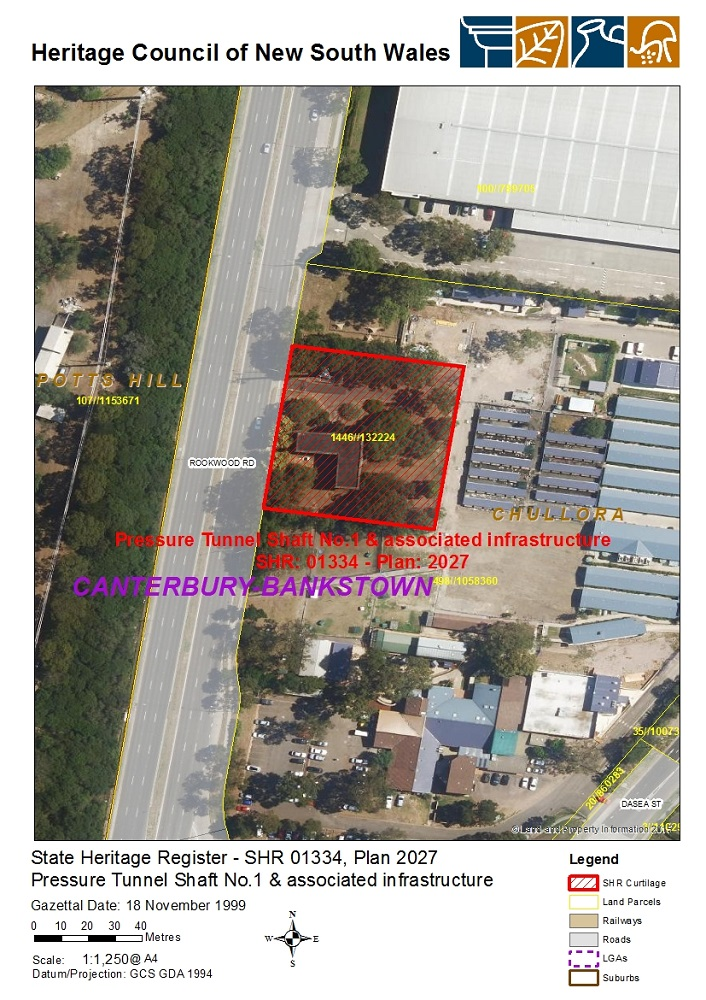
- Heritage boundaries

- Location within New South Wales Location within Australia
- 33.8954°S 151.1298°E
- Location: Potts Hill, City of Canterbury-Bankstown, New South Wales, Australia

History
- Built: 1921–1935

Site notes
- Architect: Water Board
- Owner: Sydney Water

New South Wales Heritage Register
- Official name: Pressure Tunnel and Shafts
- Type: state heritage (built)
- Designated: 15 November 2002
- Reference no.: 1630
- Type: Water Tunnel
- Category: Utilities - Water
- Builders: Water Board

Pressure Tunnel and Shafts is a heritage-listed water supply system at Potts Hill, City of Canterbury-Bankstown, New South Wales, Australia. It was designed by the Water Board, which built the tunnel from 1921 to 1935. It is the third largest pressure tunnel in the world. The property is owned by Sydney Water (State Government). It was added to the New South Wales State Heritage Register on 15 November 2002.

== History ==
=== Bankstown ===
This area was selected for settlement by Governor Hunter, who named it Banks Town in honour of eminent botanist, Sir Joseph Banks. In 1795 George Bass and Matthew Flinders had explored the Georges River, named after King George III, the reigning monarch. They sailed along what would later be the southern boundary of the municipality. They reported their findings and were given land grants in the Georges Hall area. Bass received the first grant in 1798, of 100 acres in the vicinity of the present Hazel and Flinders Streets. He did not farm it, and eventually it reverted to the Crown. Flinders' grant was alongside Bass'. He bought more land, until he held 300 acres, but did not farm it. Lieutenant John Shortland and Surveyor James Meehan also got grants. By 1799, 1200 acres on both banks of the river had been granted to marines and ex-convicts.

The area developed slowly, as it was isolated from both Sydney and Parramatta. After Liverpool Road was constructed in 1814 it began to develop rapidly, and settlements grew up along the road. Bushrangers were a problem, and in Bankstown's early days, two, Patrick Sullivan and James Moran, were hung on makeshift gallows on the site of the present Bankstown Water Tower. A few days later several of their companions were also hung there. They were probably interred in nearby unconsecrated land.

In 1831 Michael Ryan was granted 100 acres in Bankstown, which included this site, and for many years the area was called Ryan's Paddock.

The Church of England School established here in 1862, becoming the first public school in 1868, but was moved to North Bankstown in 1913. The first post office opened in 1863, but closed in 1918.

=== Water Supply Tunnel ===
Investigation for a large pressure tunnel was begun in 1914, to assist the trunk mains between Potts Hill and Crown Street. The tunnel was to extend from Potts Hill Reservoir to the Waterloo pumping station, approximately 16 kilometres. To allow for maintenance and cleaning, it was designed as two cylindrical tubes, each 1.8 metres in diameter. It was approved by the Parliamentary Standing Committee on Public Works in 1919.

Trial bores were put down in 1921 and 1922. The first tests were conducted between Potts Hill No. 1 and No.5, a length of 4 kilometres, but extensive rupturing of the lining occurred. Further fractures developed during testing of the tunnel between shafts 6 and 9. The section of the Pressure Tunnel between shafts 1 and 5 was commissioned in 1929 due to the urgent need for water. In 1930 the Board approved lining the entire length of the tunnel with steel tube (interior diameter of 8'3"). The tubing allowed for internal securing of the individual sections of the tube. The annular space between the tube and the tunnel was filled with blue metal concrete. Due to lack of funds the lining of the pipe was ceased until 1933 when funds were raised to complete the job.

In 1933 a Royal Commission into the failure of the internal lining was ordered by the government. Lining of the Pressure Tunnel was underway by this point but the Royal Commission determined responsibility of the failures. The report contained great details of pressure tunnels and failures around the world and led to an influx of qualified engineers to the Water Board of the time.

The lining was completed by 1935. The internal lining of the pipes was done with bituman which was done in the factory during manufacture. In 1961 the tunnel was the third largest in the world. The bituman lining was replaced cement lining between 1961 and 1963, as soon as the adjacent City Tunnel was complete.

== Description ==
Beginning at Potts Hill, the tunnel passes under the suburbs of Chullora, Bankstown, Enfield, Canterbury, Ashfield, Petersham, Marrickville, Erskineville, and Waterloo at a depth below ground level varying for 15m to 67m beneath high ground at Ashfield. Its maximum grade is 1 in 100, and its minimum is 1 in 2000. Its total length is approximately 16 kilometres.

The pipes are lined with sand-cement mortar and the space between the liners and walls of the tunnel is filled with concrete to support the liner against deformation from internal pressures and as a protection against corrosion. Its delivery capacity can be increased by booster pumps at Potts Hill.

Seventeen shafts were constructed along the Pressure Tunnel. Of these Shaft 1 is in Rookwood Road near Potts Hill Pumping Station. Shaft 17 is located at Waterloo at the former Central Workshops. Shafts 2, 3, 7, 8, 13 and 16 have all been filled. Shaft 5 is the dewatering shaft that is located at Therry St and discharges into the Cooks River. Shaft 11 is another dewatering shaft which discharges into Hawthorne Canal. Shaft 4 is located on Roberts Road, Shaft 12 on Chester St at Petersham, Shaft 14 on Station St at Newtown and Shaft 15 on Newton St. Shaft 6 (also referred to as Offtake Shaft No. 2) sees a change in tunnel levels. The Tunnel level was raised by 36m. Shaft 9 is also referred to as Offtake Shaft No. 3 and Shaft 10 is referred to as Offtake Shaft No. 3A. The Shaft structures were constructed at each shaft and are considered to be components of the Pressure Tunnel and shafts. The shaft structures or Pressure Tunnel buildings provide for access to each of the shafts and internal components.

The shafts are metal lined and there are eleven Pressure Tunnel buildings, the first located at Potts Hill and the final one being the Central Workshops. Other buildings are located along the western railway line at Newtown, at Weston St in Lewisham, Watson Ave Ashfield, and St Anne's Square at Strathfield South.

Internally the tunnels are substantially intact. The shafts are considerably altered.

== Heritage listing ==
The Pressure Tunnel is of high historical and technical significance as it represents a successful engineering response to the difficulties of increasing the volume of water from the Potts Hill Reservoir to the Pumping Station at Waterloo, a historically critical link in the water supply of Sydney. It is the third largest pressure tunnel in the world, representing a significant achievement in the provision of a dependable water supply by the Government and Water Board during the inter-war period.

Pressure Tunnel and Shafts was listed on the New South Wales State Heritage Register on 15 November 2002 having satisfied the following criteria.

The place is important in demonstrating the course, or pattern, of cultural or natural history in New South Wales.

The Pressure Tunnel is a key component of Sydney's water supply system whose function has remained unchanged since it was constructed.

The place is important in demonstrating aesthetic characteristics and/or a high degree of creative or technical achievement in New South Wales.

The tunnel is underground and can only be observed from the inside when dewatered.

The place has strong or special association with a particular community or cultural group in New South Wales for social, cultural or spiritual reasons.

The Pressure Tunnel and shafts are socially significant as they provided large volumes of water to the growing population of Sydney and surrounding suburbs. It provided water to the population during periods of drought and is likely to be held in high regard by the community for the function it plays.

The place has potential to yield information that will contribute to an understanding of the cultural or natural history of New South Wales.

The construction of the tunnel was delayed when the two tunnelling machine imported from England were unable to tunnel through the sandstone bedrock. The sandstone was far too hard for the cutting tools and manual labour was used instead. The fractures that resulted under full head provided a better understanding of the substrata and its properties.

The place possesses uncommon, rare or endangered aspects of the cultural or natural history of New South Wales.

This item is rare in NSW. It is the third largest pressure tunnel in the world.

The place is important in demonstrating the principal characteristics of a class of cultural or natural places/environments in New South Wales.

It is representative of the successful engineering response to the difficulties of increasing the volume of water from Potts Hill to Waterloo, and the provision of a dependable water supply during the inter-war period.

== See also ==
- Gerald Haskins
