= Potts Hill =

- Suburb
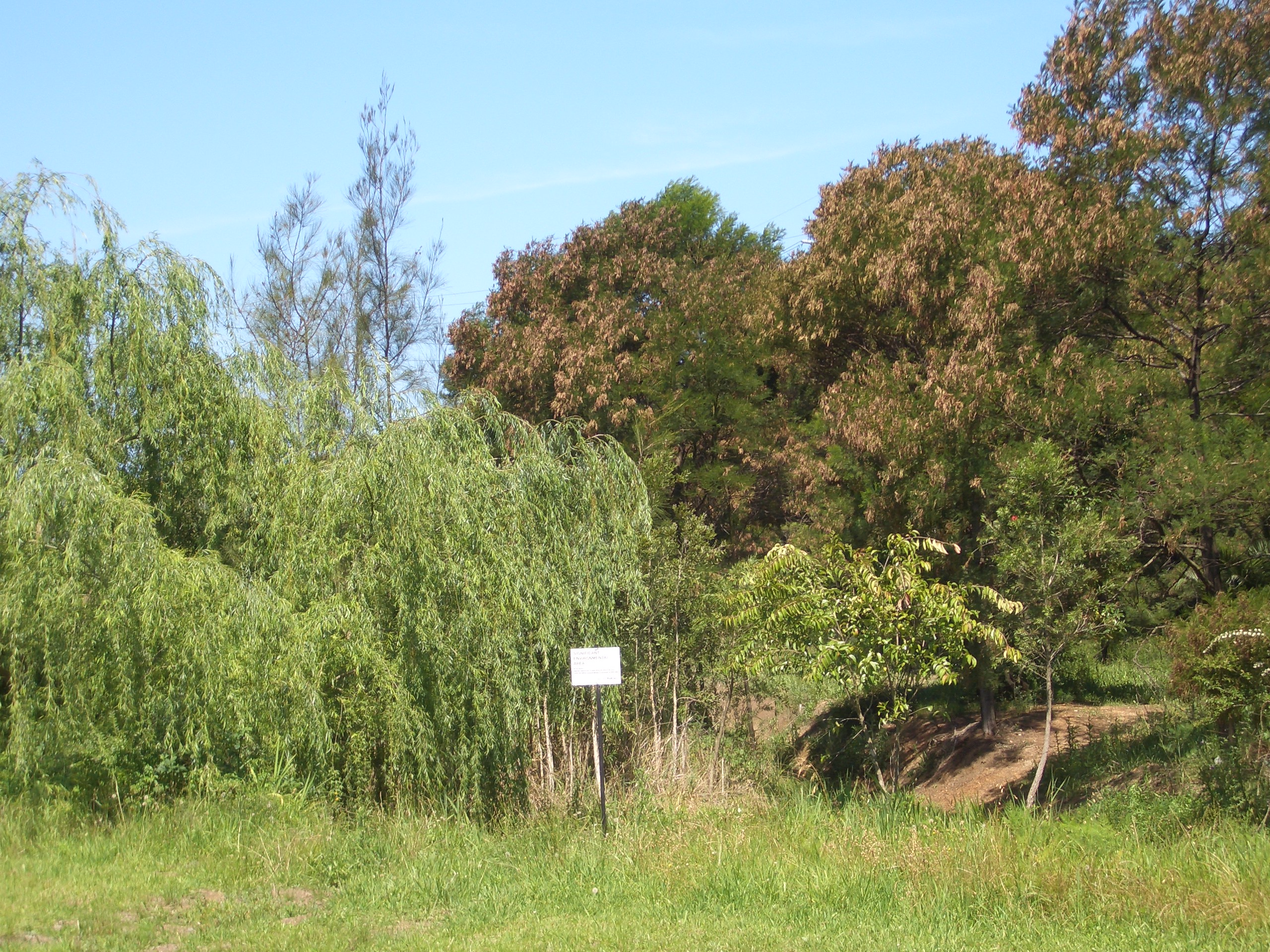
- Potts Hill bushland

- Interactive map of Potts Hill
- Country: Australia
- State: New South Wales
- City: Sydney
- LGA: City of Canterbury-Bankstown
- Location: 21 km (13 mi) south-west of CBD

Government
  - State electorate: Bankstown
  - Federal division: Blaxland
- Elevation: 57 m (187 ft)

Population
  - Total: 1,454 (2021 census)
- Postcode: 2143
Suburbs around Potts Hill
Regents Park	Berala	Lidcombe
Birrong	Potts Hill	Chullora
Yagoona	Yagoona	Chullora

Potts Hill, a suburb of local government area City of Canterbury-Bankstown, is 21 kilometres south-west of the Sydney central business district, in the state of New South Wales, Australia. It is a part of the South-western Sydney region.

Potts Hill shares its postcode of 2143 with neighbouring suburbs Regents Park and Birrong.

Much of the area of Potts Hill is occupied by the Potts Hill Reservoir owned and operated by Sydney Water.

== History ==
Potts Hill is named for Joseph Hyde Potts, an accountant in the Bank of New South Wales, who received a grant of 1,100 acres (4 km^{2}) in 1833. He originally called his property Hyde Park and had increased his holdings to 2,564 acres (10 km^{2}) by 1835. Two reservoirs were built here between 1888 and 1923 as part of the Sydney water supply system.

== Heritage listings ==
Potts Hill has a number of heritage-listed sites, including the Pressure Tunnel and Shafts water supply system and Potts Hill Reservoirs 1 and 2 on Cooper Road.

== Potts Hill migrant camp ==
In 1946 the Metropolitan Water, Sewerage and Drainage Board (MWS&DB) (now Sydney Water) started to build the City Water Tunnel – a water supply tunnel from Potts Hill to Waterloo in Sydney to supplement the existing Pressure Tunnel (started 1946, finished 1961). From 1948 to 1955 workers camps were set up at Potts Hill to accommodate the European migrant workers (Poles, Czechs, Lithuanians, and Ukrainians) who were indentured from the many displaced persons brought to Australia after World War II. Due to the proximity of Regents Park, the camp was also known as the Regents Park migrant camp.

Conditions at the Potts Hill camp were primitive. Known as "tent city", many workers had to live in tents, some of the huts were in bad repair and there was a lack of hot water, showers and electric coppers. In early 1951 there were nearly 1,000 men living in the camp. The local businessman who sold food to the workers neglected to install refrigeration and had a poor record for hygiene. Workers' wives were only allowed in the camp between 11 am and 5 pm on Sundays. Wives, particularly in hospitals, were often on night work, and did not have week-ends off. Sometimes married couples could not see each other for several months. The workers also experienced hostility from the union members of the Water Board.

== Potts Hill radio astronomy field station ==
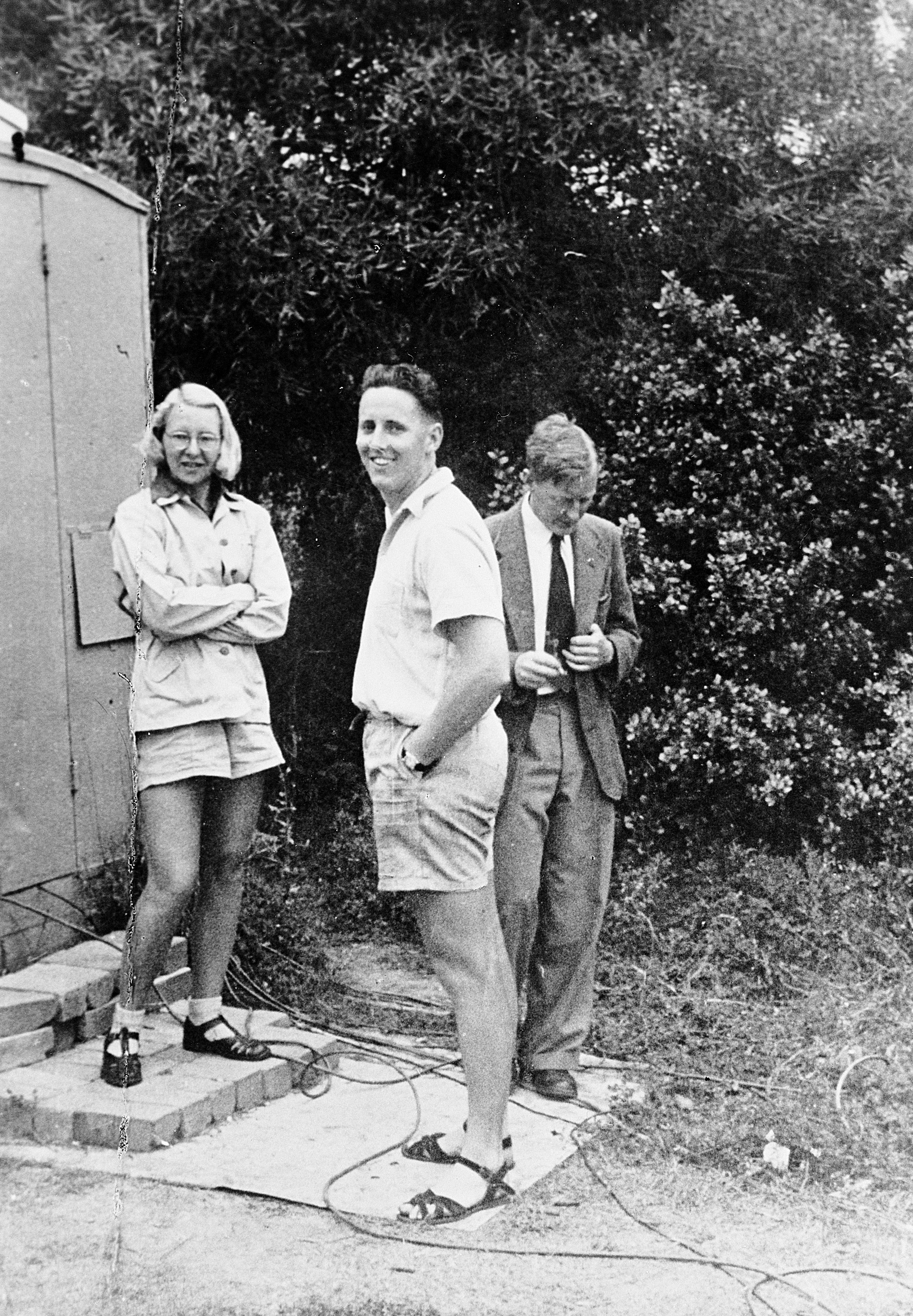
Radiophysicists Ruby Payne-Scott, Alec Little and Wilbur Christiansen at the Potts Hill Radiophysics field station in 1948.

In 1948 the Division of Radiophysics of the CSIRO obtained permission from the Water Board to operate a field station on vacant land adjacent to the Potts Hill reservoir. The southern and eastern sides of the No. 1 reservoir were used for the east–west and north–south arms of the solar grating arrays. By 1952 it had become the Division's largest field station. Equipment included a 4-element Yagi and single Yagi antennas, a 16-ft x 18-ft paraboloid, a Mills Cross Telescope prototype, a 68-inch paraboloid, swept lobe interferometer Yagi aerials, a prototype of a Fleurs Cross aerial and 16 and 32 element solar grating arrays. Radiophysics continued operations until 1962 when the field station's operations were transferred to other field stations.

== Population ==
In the 2021 Census, there were 1,454 people in Potts Hill. 45.8% of people were born in Australia. Other countries of birth included Vietnam 6.7%, South Korea 6.5%, China 5.4%, Lebanon 2.6% and Pakistan 2.5%. 27.5% of people spoke only English at home. Other languages spoken at home included Arabic 16.2%, Vietnamese 9.0%, Korean 7.8%, Mandarin 6.2% and Urdu 4.6%. The most common responses for religion were Islam 35.5%, No Religion 16.7%, Catholic 13.5%, Buddhism 7.4% and Not stated 7.2%.

== In popular culture ==
Mad Max: Fury Road (2015) was partly filmed at Potts Hill.

== See also ==
- Bankstown Bunker—A disused RAAF operations bunker that was used during World War II
- Potts Hill railway line
