= Ryde Pumping Station =

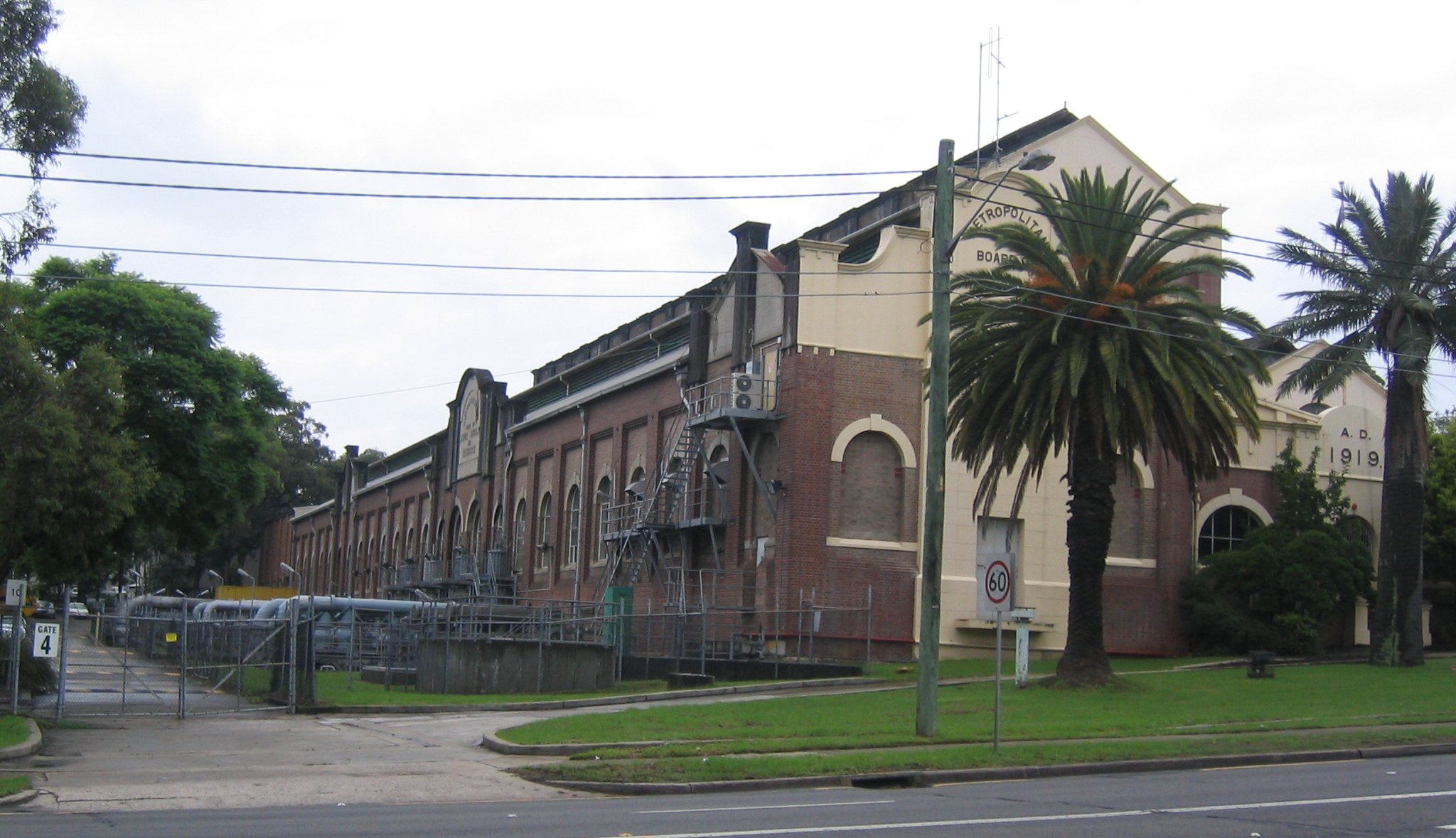
- West Ryde pumping station

- Location within Sydney Location within Australia
- 33°48′36″S 151°05′28″E
- Location: Victoria Road, West Ryde, New South Wales, Australia

History
- Built: 1891–1921
- Built for: Metropolitan Board of Water Supply and Sewerage

Site notes
- Owner: Sydney Water

New South Wales Heritage Register
- Official name: Ryde Pumping Station and site; WP005; West Ryde Pumping Station
- Type: State heritage (built)
- Designated: 15 November 2002
- Reference no.: 1634
- Type: Water Pump House/Pumping Station
- Category: Utilities - Water
- Builders: William Adams & Co. Ltd.; State Monier Works; Refshaw & O'Brien

The Ryde Pumping Station is a heritage-listed pumping station and offices located at Victoria Road, West Ryde, New South Wales, Australia. It was built from 1891 to 1921 by William Adams & Co. Ltd., State Monier Works, Refshaw & O'Brien. It is also known as Ryde Pumping Station and site, WP005 and West Ryde Pumping Station. The property is owned by Sydney Water. It was added to the New South Wales State Heritage Register on 15 November 2002.

== History ==
The Ryde area was highly suitable for farming and orchards, and early grants to marines were given to encourage agriculture. In 1792 land in the area was granted to eight marines; two of the grants were in the modern area of Ryde. Isaac Archer and John Colethread each received 32 hectares (80 acres) of land on the site of the present Ryde-Parramatta Golf Links, now in West Ryde. Later in 1792, in the Eastern Farms area, twelve grants, most of them about 12 hectares (30 acres), were made to convicts. Much later these farms were bought by John Macarthur, Gregory Blaxland and the Reverend Samuel Marsden. The district remained an important orchard area throughout the 19th century.

=== Pumping station ===
The first pumping station at Ryde was built by the Harbours and Rivers Department, and handed over to the newly formed Metropolitan Board of Water Supply & Sewerage (MBWS&S) in 1891. Water was delivered from Potts Hill Reservoir to a balance reservoir at West Ryde railway station. From here a pair of 146-horsepower (109 kW) vertical, compound, direct-acting, surface-condensing pumping engines (by J. Watts & Co. Birmingham), lifted 3,400 gal/min of water to Ryde tank and Chatswood, to supply Sydney's northern distribution system.

By 1916 the need to further increase pumping capacity could no longer be accommodated in the existing station. Land on the eastern boundary of the old station was acquired, and a second much larger pumping station built. The new station was completed during 1921 and commissioned on 15 September. Gradually the new station took over the pumping duties of the old until the old pumping station ceased to operate during November 1930. The old station was used as a store until it was demolished in 1961.

The new pumping station went through continual upgrades and amplifications to raise its pumping capacity from 20 megalitres per day (8.2×10^{3} cu ft/ks) (including the old pumping station) in 1921, to 66 megalitres per day (0.027×10^{6} cu ft/ks) in 1956, to 90 megalitres per day (0.037×10^{6} cu ft/ks) (410ML/day) in 1973, to 590 megalitres per day (0.24×10^{6} cu ft/ks) in 1982.

In 1921 the station was pumping to Chatswood, Pymble, Wahroonga, Hermitage, Mobbs Hill and Beecroft Reservoirs - thus to most of the North Shore.

By 1982 the conversion to electrification was completed. With 13 pumping units installed and another on standby, the capacity of the station after electrification stood at 700 megalitres per day (0.29×10^{6} cu ft/ks).

The combination of electrification over steam, more powerful prime movers and improved suction mains, rising mains and manifolds, resulted in the great increase in capacity at the new station. This led to Ryde becoming the largest domestic water pumping station in Australia at that time.

Turpentine-Ironbark forest on Wianamatta shale was the main vegetation type for much of the Ryde area. A typical sample is that within the small reserve (Wallumatta Nature Reserve) at Twin Road, Ryde and includes Turpentine and Grey Gum.

During the 19th century much of the Ryde area was cleared for its timber and to provide land for farming while the post-WW II suburban expansion resulted in the further loss of extensive remnant areas of bushland. More recent treatment of the grounds reflects an attempt to soften the impact of the introduction of the many office buildings and demountables associated with the use of the place by Sydney Water and, until June 2001, Australian Water Technologies.

== Description ==
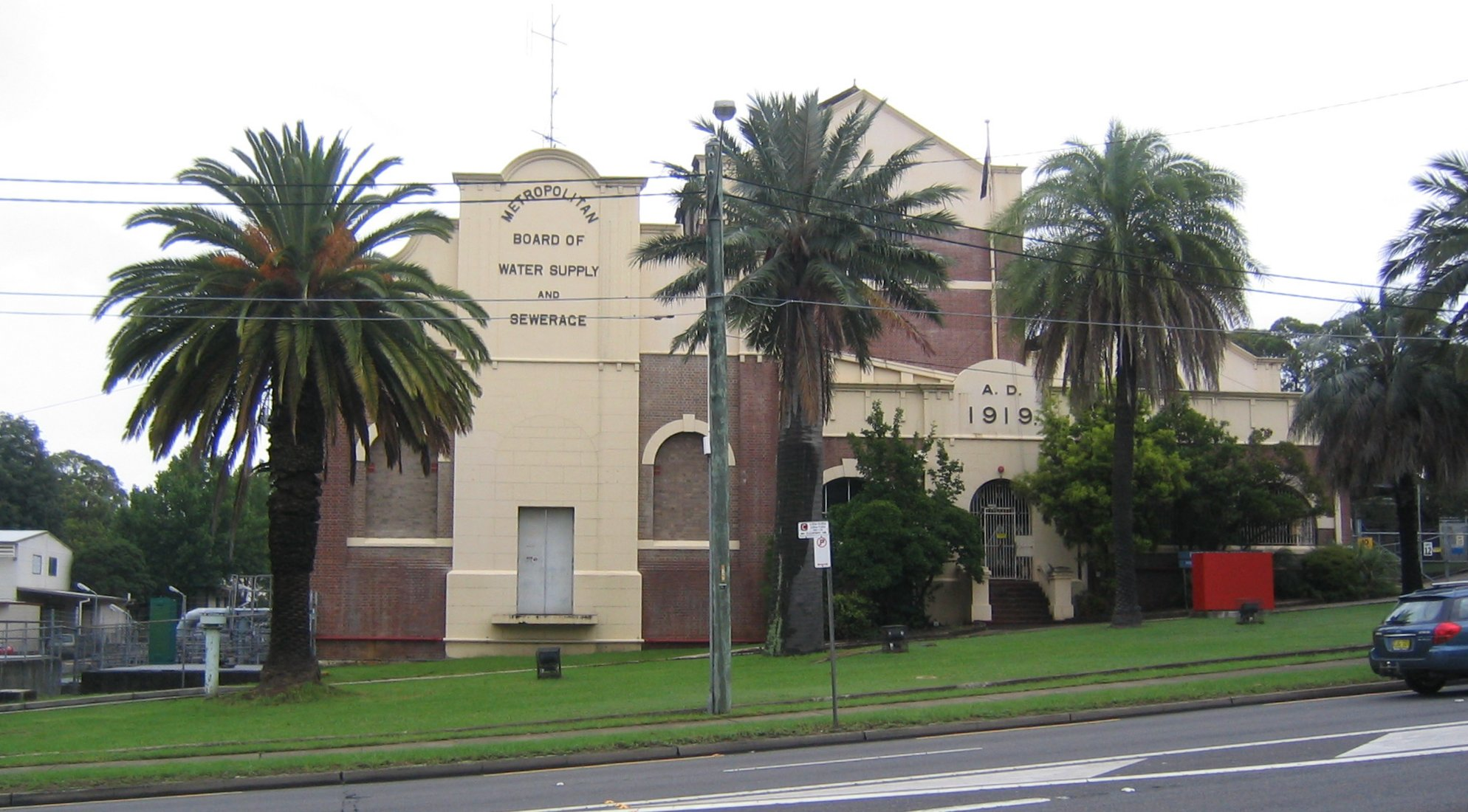
The facade of the pumping station facing Victoria Road

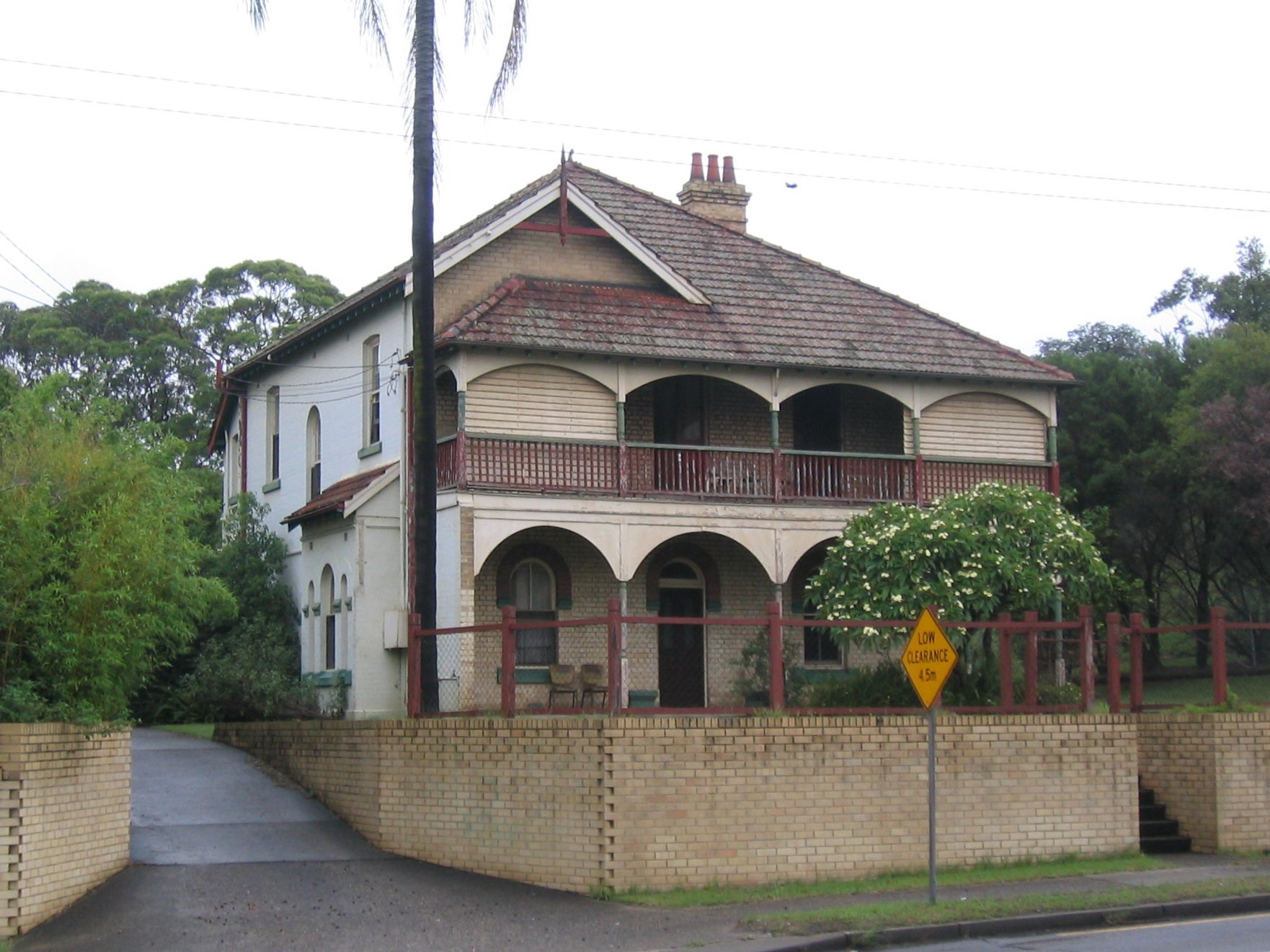
The pumping station manager's house in West Ryde, not listed on the heritage register.

The Ryde Pumping Station is located in West Ryde, on an irregular shaped block of land bounded by Victoria Road to the north, by Hermitage Road to the south east and by the Strathfield to Hornsby railway line to the west. While the Ryde site continues to be used for water pumping purposes, it also houses the offices of AWT ES & T in a mosaic of permanent and temporary buildings generally dating from the late 20th Century.

The pumping station building which fronts Victoria Road comprises a small Administration Block, the Engine House and the adjoining Boiler House and Economiser House. There is also a reinforced concrete viaduct or coal staith at the south end, which allowed railway coal wagons to be transported to the top of the building and emptied over the coal bunkers inside. Under the Engine and Boiler Houses there are basements and a sub-basement is located under the Engine Room which houses the turbine condensers and auxiliary pumps.

The Boiler House occupies the central section of the Pumping Station and is much higher than the flanking Engines and Economiser Houses, the cladding on the main roof and the monitor is the original fibro tiles.

The Boiler House still contains its rail lines and coal bunkers at roof level, but the boilers have been removed.

The Economiser House is on the west side of the building adjoining the Boiler House but much lower. Its roof structure, cladding and length is the same as the Boiler House. Although it is now empty it originally contained the economisers, induced draught fans and the feed pumps and feed water heater for the boilers.

Original reservoir valve house: A red brick and stone Queen Anne revival valve enclosure which is located on the western side of the original reservoir. The valve house enclosure is missing its original door case and all windows are boarded up preventing access. Graffiti has defaced the walls. Its location is most discreet being screened by mature trees and the battered earth wall of the reservoir and is adjacent to the railway line. It is now disused.

Original suction tank (reservoir): Construction of the reservoir is semi-submerged originally surrounded by battered earth walls and constructed of mass concrete walls and floor. In c.1930 Victoria Road was cut adjacent to the reservoir and there are mid to late 20th century trees and fence which now surround the reservoir. In the late 20th century a new roof was fitted to the top of the reservoir. The reservoir is now disused however it serves as a supplementary function to the water pumping station as a surge tank.

Apart from the cutting in Victoria Road and the roofing to the reservoir, the reservoir otherwise would be considerably intact.

To the south west of the original reservoir, historical evidence describes a railway spur to a coal dump which is now turfed. Little evidence survives on the surface of that former use although it may be considered an archaeologically sensitive zone.

80 metres south of the original reservoir are located late 20th century storage sheds, steel framed and steel sheet clad.

In the area shown on historical plans where the original pumping station was located is now a concrete paved carpark adjacent to the railway line, and in part bordered by concrete and block walls which in part formed bins for stock piling of coal and aggregate for works purposes. Within one of the existing block enclosures are located three remnants of the original reinforced concrete chimney stacks to the 1921 pumping station. It is possible that the concrete driveway which forms the base of the carpark is possibly over the railway line which fed the original pumping station.

Archaeological evidence remains clearly of the railway tracks which fed the coal bins to the former original pumping station in the area presently covered by a steel framed shed. To the west of the shed is a clearly evident railway formation leading from the adjacent railway line and heading in a southerly direction. Little tangible evidence remains of the coal bins although the existing rail evidence needs further archaeological investigation.

To the south east of shed no. 3 was an area in the mid to late 20th century used for testing of subsoil clay pipes and their effects with tree roots as evidenced by the poplars which survive today.

It is possible the footings to shed no. 3 form the original footings of the original loco shed.

Located south west and adjacent to the former locomotive shed is an original timber frame and corrugated iron clad skid shed which is now a rare item in Sydney Water's system of past work practices. It has been recently repainted, but note traditionally they were not painted. The condition would appear to be fair to good and reasonably intact.

To the south east of the original reservoir surrounding the late 20th century brick and concrete valve enclosure is a cutting made in concrete crib wall within the original battered earth wall to the reservoir.

North east of the original reservoir is located the original engineer's residence. It is a late Victorian brick residence using glazed cream brick and understood to be single storey originally with the first storey added soon after. To its second storey addition are original joinery, and detail is to that period including, verandahs and marseilles pattern terracotta tiles with decorative terracotta ridge caps and finials which are more reminiscent of the Federation period. The side walls are painted although a rear utilitarian wing remains unpainted. To the south east of the original engineer's residence is a brick and corrugated iron privy with original ledged and sheeted doors and vents. The engineer's residence is substantially intact to the first storey addition period and appears to be in good condition.

10 metres east of the original engineer's residence is a valve chamber which is concrete and houses late 20th century gate valves following the electrification of the pumping station in 1982.

30 metres south east of the engineer's residence is the brick and rendered original efficiency engineer's office dating from the 1921 period. It is a brick building with steel frame windows and original corrugated asbestos sheet roof. An amenity section is located at the southern end of this building. It is now used for office/conference facility but generally is substantially intact and in good condition.

The main existing pumping station is brick with rendered details dating from 1921. The overall construction of the pumping station comprises a brick walled and steel framed interior economiser house with extant bases of the original reinforced concrete chimneys. Timber louvres remain to the original monitor roof. Arched headed windows are in steel and only a few original steel windows remain in the front office areas. Mid to late 20th century security bars have been fitted to the windows and verandah enclosure to the office. The external cladding of the upper most monitor roof is corrugated steel and the guttering has been replaced in colorbond.

Some windows to the offices have been changed from their original steel to timber and aluminium in the late 20th century. A reasonable amount of the interior finishes and joinery in the offices remains intact, although the economiser house has been stripped and disused. On the upper reaches of the boiler house are the original coal bunkers which were fed from the existing reinforced concrete coal staith which heads in a southern direction from the upper reaches of the boiler house. Evidence remains in the concrete floor of boiler and ash pits. Both the boiler house and economiser house are in poor condition. Directly east and adjoining the boiler house is the original 1921 engine house which is of the same construction overall as the boiler house and economiser house.

The existing pumps and engines in the engine house date from the mid to late 20th century following the electrification of the pumping station. On the eastern side of the engine house are the majority of pipes and valves (manifolds) which largely date from the mid and late 20th century.

It is understood a considerable amount of machinery and equipment over the whole site was replaced with the electrification of the pumping station in the late 1970s and early 1980s.

The roofing to the engine house is late 20th century sheet metal roofing with original timber louvred monitors to its ridge. At the southern end of the engine house were added some 6 bays which became known as the Mobbs Hill extension. Adjoining the Mobbs Hill extension to the south again is a mid to late 20th century workshop building constructed of brick walls, gable roof with sheet metal roof cladding and roof lights. A separate building to the south of the economiser house is an original brick with flat roof former paint shop, the exterior of which is considerably intact but in poor condition. To the east of the former paint shop is a reinforced concrete neumatic ash tank which appears to be considerably intact but in poor condition.

Some 10 metres to the south of the Hermitage Road entrance to the site is located a single storey brick and concrete roofed pump and valve house dating from the early to mid 20th century. To the west of this pump house is a turfed area which was formally an ash pit and it is understood a channel exists under the subsoil to the pumping station as archaeological evidence of the management of ash and the development of that management on the site. Adjoining to the south of the ash pit is archaeological evidence in the present driveway of the steel gantry and crane system which stock piled the ash for disposal. The integrity of the early to mid 20th century ash pump house is considerably intact and its condition fair. The integrity of the ash pit has been infilled, although archaeological potential of this area of this site is high.

A considerable number of exotic plantings including Canary Island palms and Peppercorn trees surround the site dating from the original landscaping of the 1922 pumping station. The treatment of landscaping and pathways and driveways within Water Board sites of this period cannot be underestimated as they were purposely designed to be of an aesthetically high standard.

Overall the integrity of the buildings which date from the 1922 redevelopment of the site and the original reservoir remain substantially intact. The machinery however including plant and equipment has been largely changed and much of the operational original infrastructure has been lost.

As a cultural landscape the triangular-shaped site contains four distinct layers of site history - pre-European vegetation remnants; 19th century plantings from its agricultural phase; plantings associated with the 1920s pumping station development; and more recent plantings associated with the use of the site as offices.

Remnants of the earlier indigenous vegetation community include several large grey gums (Eucalyptus punctata) near the northeast of the site; scattered Turpentines (Syncarpia glomulifera) near the main entry off Hermitage Road as well as elsewhere within the site; a group of White Stringybark (Eucalyptus globoidea) to the south of the pump station; and a solitary White Mahogany? (Eucalyptus acmenioides) to the west of the pump station.

Remnant plantings of Pepper Trees (Schinus molle var. areira) survive from the site's 19th century agricultural phase. Several of these trees are very large particularly those near the front carpark and near he eastern boundary off Hermitage Road.

An impressive group of palm plantings survive along the front site address with Victoria Road as part of the 1920s development phase of the pump station. Species include three Chilean Wine Palms (Jubaea chilensis) - one being on the 1890s suction tank embankment to the west; Jelly Palm (Butia capitata); Canary Island Date Palm (Phoenix canariensis) and Date Palm (Phoenix dactylifera). More early 20th century plantings remain around the former Engineer's Residence including palms, a Cypress (Cupressus sp.), a Pine (Podocarpus sp.) and an unidentified tree worth further investigation.

More recent plantings have been undertaken as part of the work where new buildings and a complex of demountables have been added to the site.

While a considerable amount of original (1921) technology in terms of plant and equipment has been removed, substantial tangible evidence remains of buildings, cultural landscape elements, archaeological evidence of the former work practices and cultural.

== Heritage listing ==
As at 30 November 2001, Ryde pumping station as a whole is highly significant as an integral component of the water supply system to much of Sydney. At its completion it was the largest water pumping station in Australia, and today retains considerable fabric and work practices which can be interpreted from that period. While much of the significant plant and equipment has been removed and replaced, it still maintains the overall function and values it was designed for. The significant curtilage includes only the buildings, works, archaeological evidence, machinery and equipment, sheds, and cultural landscape elements (including paths, drives, plantings etc.) up to 1930 listed in the following pages.

The Ryde Pumping Station site contains landscape elements of high significance and has the ability to demonstrate three important and distinct phases of its history by its pre-European vegetation remnants, farming phase remnants and the distinctive 1890s earthworks and group of 1920s plantings associated with, respectively, the 1890s site use, and 1920s major expansion, for the North Shore water supply.

The design of the main civic address both built, (pumping station and residence) and planted, demonstrates the high importance placed on the site at this time of its development. The place continues to make an important contribution to the local townscape and serve as an outstanding landmark group.

The remnant 1920s plantings are likely to have associative value in being with the influence of JH Maiden Director of the Royal Botanic Gardens (!896-1924) and include mature species that are uncommon within the State Chilean Wine Palm (Jubaea chilensis). The place holds scientific value as a reserve for indigenous vegetation remnants.

Ryde Pumping Station was listed on the New South Wales State Heritage Register on 15 November 2002 having satisfied the following criteria.

The place is important in demonstrating the course, or pattern, of cultural or natural history in New South Wales.

Ryde Pumping Station maintains tangible evidence of the largest pumping station in Australia at the time of its construction.

The pumping station continues its original function supplying water to the northern areas of Sydney.

Ryde Pumping Station was for many years considered the most important pumping station in the Sydney Water System and the only one warranting appointment of a grade 1 pumping engineer in charge.

The pumping station and its tangible historical components are clear evidence of former work practices on a scale for its type of operation now rare in the Sydney Water System.

Remnant site vegetation clearly reflects four distinct phases of the site's history (refer to site description). The steep, highly compacted embankment around the suction tank in the northwest corner of the site is an important tangible element in the site's development and dates to the early 1890s. The palms reflect the character of plantings usually associated with government-related projects for which JH Maiden (Director of the Royal Botanic Gardens) had involvement and it is entirely feasible that he had advised on the treatment of the early 1920s pump station work before his retirement in 1924.

The place is important in demonstrating aesthetic characteristics and/or a high degree of creative or technical achievement in New South Wales.

The Ryde Pumping Station buildings and cultural landscape are prominent elements in the townscape of Ryde.

The main engine house and former boiler and economiser houses along with the cultural landscape reflect the importance of civic design at the time of their construction.

The site in its remnant historical buildings provide tangible evidence of high quality industrial design and detailing of government buildings of the time.

The whole of the remnant building/landscape group addressing Victoria Road is an imposing local landmark within the local townscape.

The place has a strong or special association with a particular community or cultural group in New South Wales for social, cultural or spiritual reasons.

The place is likely to be held in high regard by a broad range of community members and organisations. The historical significance and function the pumping station plays is recognised by organisations such as the National Trust and the Institution of Engineers of Australia along with other members of the community for the important role it has played in the cultural development of Sydney.

The familiar and distinct Victoria Road address likely holds high social value as an important local reference point.

The place has potential to yield information that will contribute to an understanding of the cultural or natural history of New South Wales.

Ryde Pumping Station has been the site of many innovative and substantial attempts at water supply technology. Such evidence includes the following:

- The turbine and powered pumps in 1906 were an early use of a highly successful system.
- The use of reinforced concrete instead of brick for the chimneys in 1918 was a relatively early use of that type.
- The use of electrically welded steam piping in 1921.
- The use of pneumatic ash collection in 1923.
- The use of cement spray ("cement gun") rendering in 1923.
- The pulverised coal fuel for boilers between 1922 and 1927.

The site contains a number of elements which are now rare or if not unique in Sydney Water's System of former work practices including the coal staith, archaeological evidence of railway sidings for former use of the site, substantial late 19th Century engineer's residence, amongst numerous other built elements and movable relics which give evidence to the work practices at the completion of the no. 2 pumping station in 1921.

The remnant representative indigenous vegetation is important in understanding the composition of the pre-European vegetation communities in the Ryde area.

The place possesses uncommon, rare or endangered aspects of the cultural or natural history of New South Wales.

The West Ryde Pumping Station's site and its significant components comprise the most substantial example of such technology in the Sydney Water System and in NSW if not Australia. The 1920s plantings are rare specific Government landscape design.

The place is important in demonstrating the principal characteristics of a class of cultural or natural places/environments in New South Wales.

The site's use as a pumping station is representative of the methods used throughout the Sydney Water System to facilitate water supply to local service reservoirs on a more regional basis, albeit none were as large as West Ryde Pumping Station.

== Engineering heritage award ==
The pumping station received an Engineering Heritage National Marker from Engineers Australia as part of its Engineering Heritage Recognition Program.

== See also ==
- List of reservoirs and dams in New South Wales
- Sydney Water
