= Berala =

- Suburb
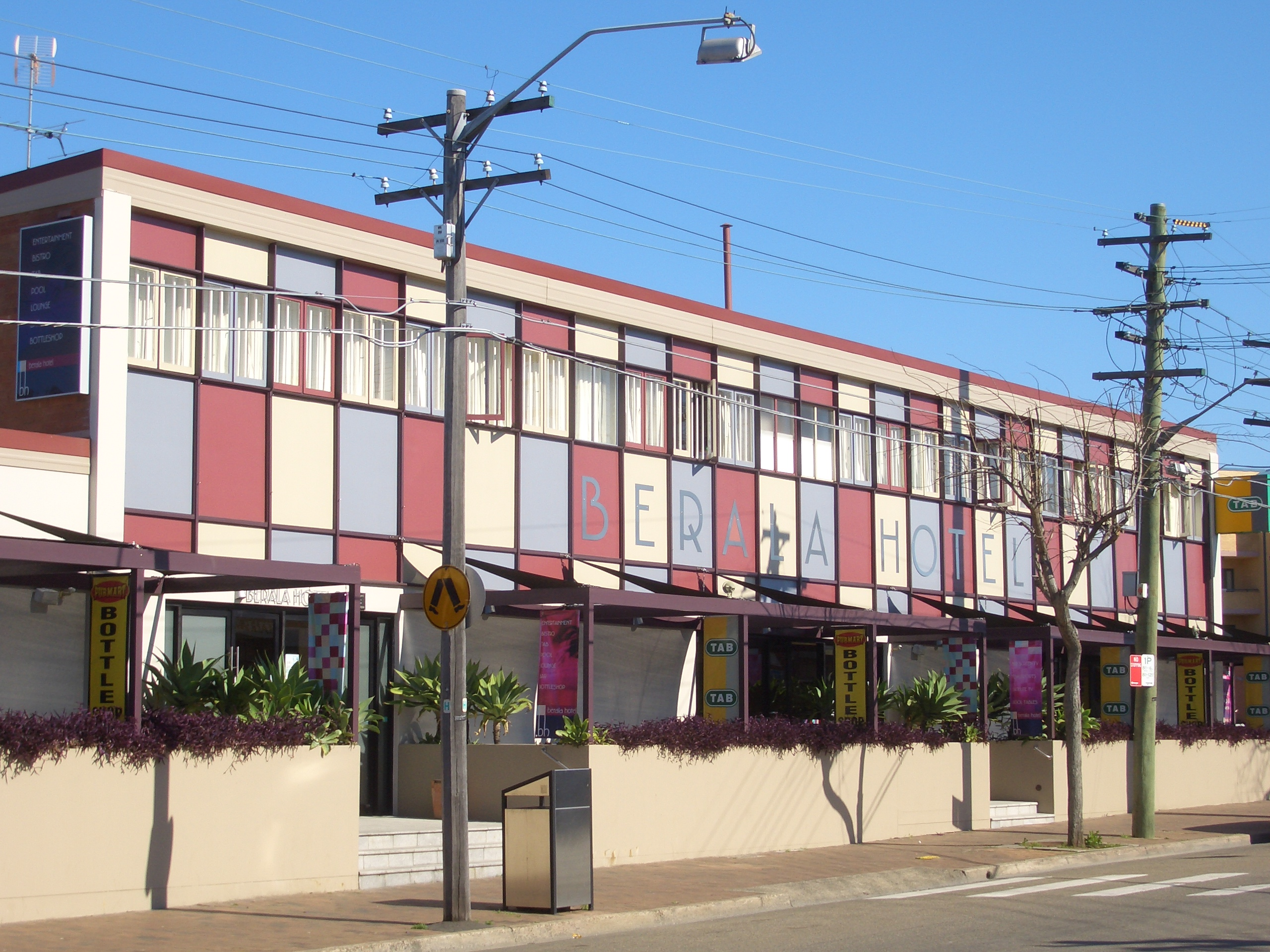
- Berala Hotel, Woodburn Road

- Interactive map of Berala
- Coordinates: 33°52′30″S 151°01′51″E
- Country: Australia
- State: New South Wales
- City: Sydney
- LGA: Cumberland Council
- Location: 16 km (9.9 mi) west of Sydney CBD

Government
  - State electorate: Auburn
  - Federal division: Blaxland
- Elevation: 28 m (92 ft)

Population
  - Total: 8,757 (2021 census)
- Postcode: 2141
Suburbs around Berala
Auburn	Auburn	Lidcombe
Auburn	Berala	Lidcombe
Regents Park	Regents Park	Chullora

Berala is an inner suburb of Sydney, which connects the inner west, south west and western parts of Sydney in the state of New South Wales, Australia, located only 16 kilometres west of the central business district, in the local government area of Cumberland Council. Postcode: 2141, sharing it with Lidcombe.

== History ==
Berala is derived from Bareela, an Aboriginal word for a musk duck. When the railway line was being extended from Lidcombe to Regents Park, the names Torrington, Sidmouth and Bareela were considered. The station opened in 1912, the public school in 1924 and the post office in 1927.

== Transport ==
Berala railway station is on the Main Southern railway line. Bus services run between Auburn and Bankstown.

== Commercial area ==
A small group of shops is located beside the railway station, including a Charcoal Chicken, a newsagent and the EVT bakery. A Woolworths is located next to the train station.

== Demographics ==
According to the 2021 census, there were 8,757 residents in Berala. The most common reported ancestries were Chinese 37.4%, English 8.2%, Australian 7.1%, Vietnamese 5.6% and Lebanese 4.3%. 35.6% of people were born in Australia. The next most common countries of birth were China 17.3%, Vietnam 8.6%, Philippines 3.2%, South Korea 2.6% and Afghanistan 1.9%. 21.3% of people only spoke English at home. Other languages spoken at home included Mandarin 18.0%, Cantonese 14.4%, Arabic 5.9%, Vietnamese 4.8% and Korean 3.1%. The most common responses for religious affiliation were No Religion 27.4%, Catholic 18.1%, Islam 14.8% and Buddhism 12.4%.

Berala was, until recent years, a working-class suburb. Over the past decade, Berala has experienced gentrification due to its central location relative to the city and other hubs such as Parramatta and Miranda, alongside the westward expansion and development of the Sydney metropolitan area and 21st-century immigration. Professionals and skilled workers increasingly reside in the community. It is located in the central part of Sydney.

== Schools ==
Berala Public School is the local public primary school. St Peter Chanel Catholic Primary School caters for primary aged children mainly of Roman Catholic denomination. There is also Trinity Junior Catholic College (formerly known as St Peter Chanel Girls High School).

== Sport and recreation ==
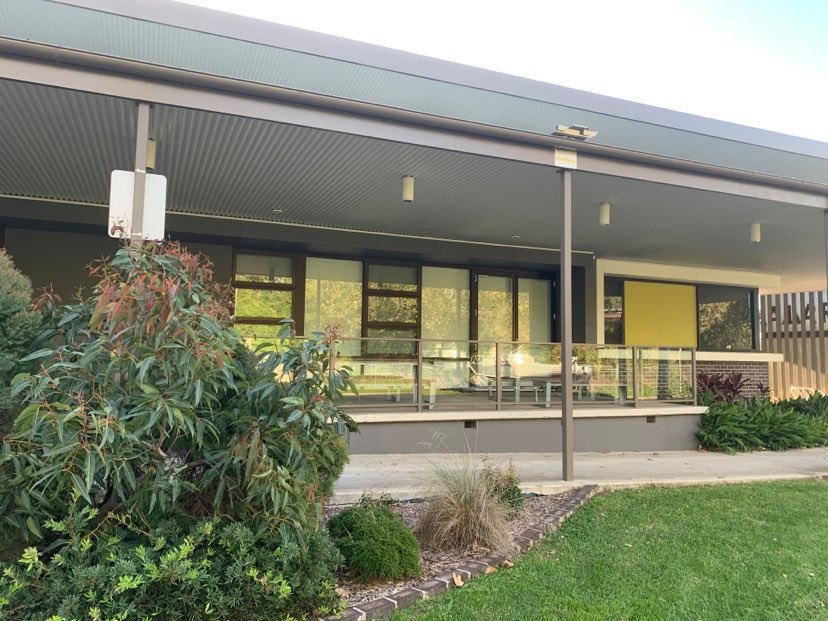
The Berala Community Centre for Recreation Activities

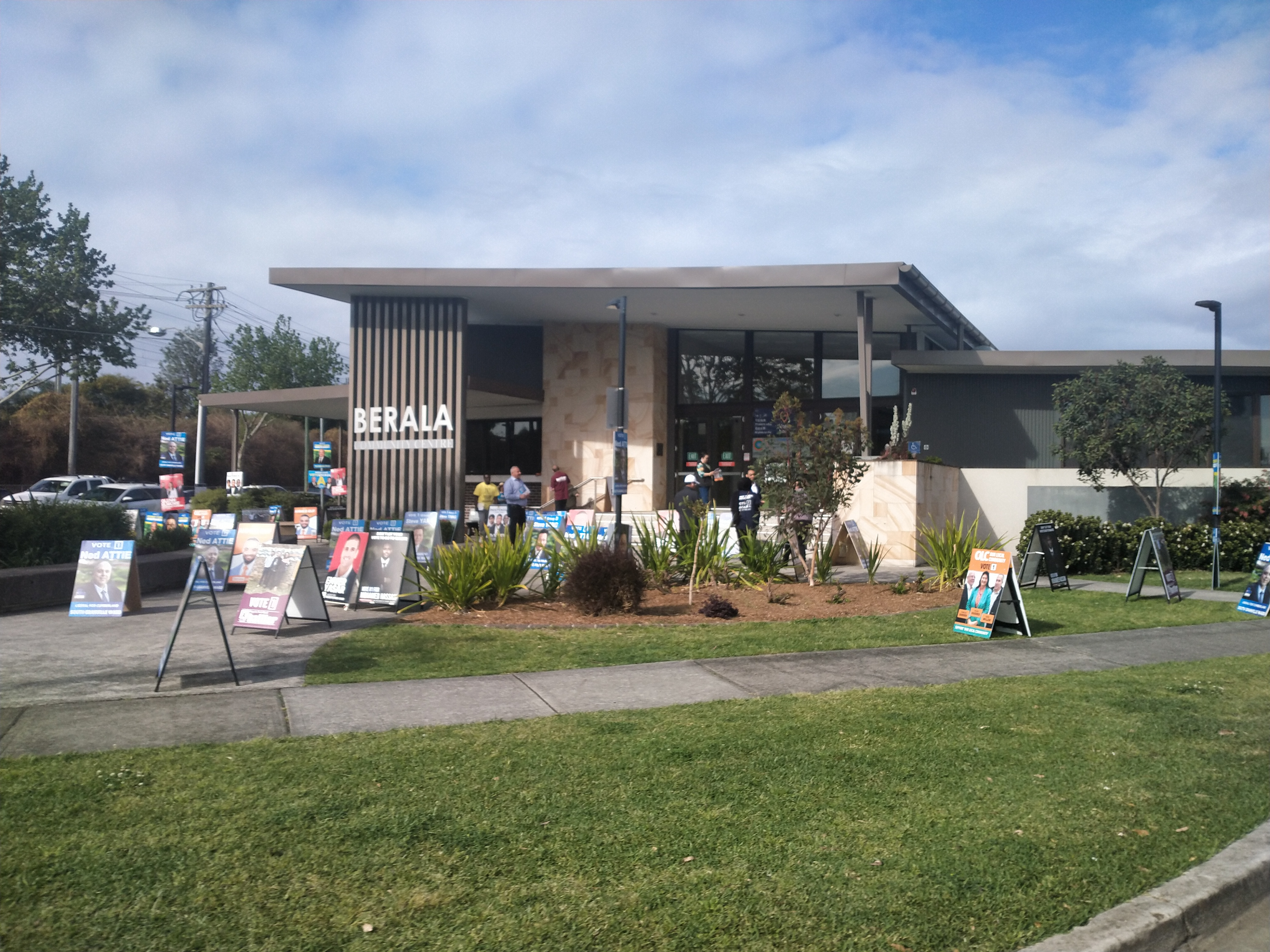
The front, this was taken during the 2024 local elections.

The Berala Community Centre is currently of use for recreation activities.

Coleman Park comprises two full-size soccer fields, two mini soccer fields, a baseball field, a children's recreation area and basketball facilities. The Lidcombe Waratahs soccer club is based there.

The Berala Bears is a junior rugby league team that plays in the Canterbury-Bankstown District Junior Rugby League competition. Their colours are gold and black, and their home ground is at Guilfoyle Park in the neighbouring suburb of Regents Park. Former Berala Bears players include Brisbane Broncos forward Terry Matterson, Sydney Roosters winger Daniel Tupou, former Canterbury-Bankstown Bulldogs and Wests Tigers winger Matt Utai, South Sydney Rabbitohs half Jeremy Smith, Manly-Warringah Sea Eagles forward Anthony Watmough, South Sydney Rabbitohs hooker Apisai Koroisau and Sydney Roosters utility player Samisoni Langi, Melbourne Storm winger Isaac Lumelume.
