= Potts Hill Reservoirs 1 and 2 =

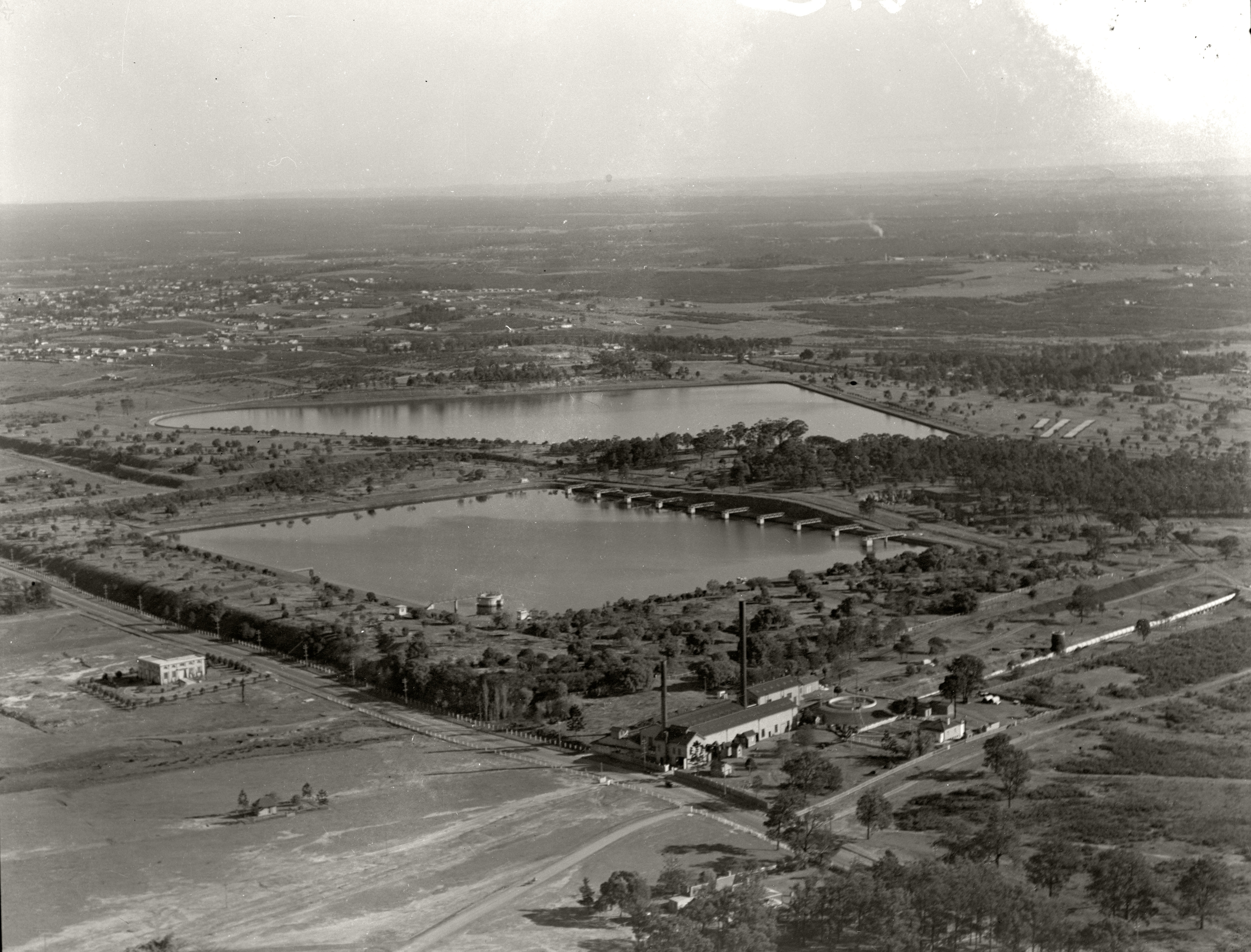
- Potts Hill Reservoirs, 1937

- Location within New South Wales Location within Australia
- 33.8936°S 151.0327°E
- Location: Cooper Road, Potts Hill, City of Canterbury-Bankstown, New South Wales, Australia

History
- Built: 1880–

Site notes
- Architect(s): Board of Water Supply and Sewerage & Sydney Water
- Owner: Sydney Water

New South Wales Heritage Register
- Official name: Potts Hill Reservoirs 1 & 2 and Site
- Type: state heritage (built)
- Designated: 18 November 1999
- Reference no.: 1333
- Type: Water Supply Reservoir/ Dam
- Category: Utilities - Water

Potts Hill Reservoirs 1 and 2 are heritage-listed reservoirs at Cooper Road, Potts Hill, City of Canterbury-Bankstown, New South Wales, Australia. They were designed by Board of Water Supply and Sewerage and built from 1880. The reservoirs are now maintained by the Board's successor, Sydney Water (a corporation owned by the state government). It was added to the New South Wales State Heritage Register on 18 November 1999.

== History ==
=== Yagoona ===
This residential suburb just north of Bankstown was known as Irishtown, at least as early as 1833. Two other suburbs in the area (Bass Hill and North Bankstown) were at one time also called that name. Like Bankstown, Irishtown, or Yagoona as it became known in 1927, was classified as a rural area. The name "Yagoona" is Aboriginal for "now" or "today". The present suburb was created by changing the boundaries in the area, when Bankstown began to expand.

In 1831 a number of grants of 30 to 50 acres were made north of Liverpool Road. Early landowners included Thomas Walford, Martin Short, Thomas Kennedy, Samuel Terry, Patrick Whalan and Joseph Eldridge (who received 100 acres that year). In 1839 Samuel Thornton received 100 acres at Irishtown, east of the present Saltash Street and south of Liverpool Road. One of the earliest churches in the suburb was the Methodist church on Dutton's Hill, in use at the end of 1859.

The first police station was built in Yagoona in the 1950s when the suburb began to develop and new houses were being built. A post office had operated since 1941.

=== Upper Nepean Scheme ===
==== Prospect Reservoir ====
In 1867, the Governor of NSW appointed a Commission to recommend a scheme for Sydney's water supply, and by 1869 it was recommended that construction commence on the Upper Nepean Scheme. This consisted of two diversion weirs, located at Pheasant's Nest and Broughton's Pass, in the Upper Nepean River catchment, with water feeding into a series of tunnels, canals and aqueducts known as the Upper Canal. It was intended that water be fed by gravity from the catchment into a reservoir at Prospect. This scheme was to be Sydney's fourth water supply system, following the Tank Stream, Busby's Bore and the Botany (Lachlan) Swamps.

Designed and constructed by the Public Works Department of NSW, Prospect Reservoir was built during the 1880s and completed in 1888. Credit for the Upper Nepean Scheme is largely given to Edward Orpen Moriarty, the Engineer in Chief of the Harbours and Rivers Branch of the Public Works Department from 1858 to 1888.

==== Potts Hill Reservoirs ====
There are two reservoirs at Potts Hill; Potts Hill Reservoir, which was built as an important component of the initial Upper Nepean Scheme which was commissioned in 1888. The second, Potts hill Reservoir 2, which has almost twice the capacity of the former, and was built in 1923 to supplement the first, and is also regarded as a component of the Upper Nepean scheme. When the Upper Nepean scheme was commissioned, Prospect was the major storage reservoir, and Potts Hill No. 1 was the key service reservoir to cope with daily fluctuations in demand. They currently operate as key service reservoirs for a large part of the south western metropolitan area. Likewise, Prospect Reservoir, is now only a service reservoir rather than a storage reservoir.

== Description ==
The Potts Hill Reservoir site is near Regents Park and Bankstown. It is situated upon the highpoint of the area and is bounded by Rookwood Road and Brunker Road, Cooper Road and the Sydney Water Supply Pipelines. Reservoir No. 1 was the first reservoir on the site, constructed between 1887 and 1889.

Reservoir No. 1 is a rectangular shaped enclosure, constructed of earthen banks with puddled clay cores with a concrete floor. The embankments are primarily built by excavation but the southeast corner was constructed by building up with fill. The embankments are lined on their inner faces with sandstone masonry and this facing shows evidence in places of reconstruction, both in sandstone and concrete, following failures of the embankments at various times.

Reservoir No. 2 has a broadly triangular shape and is constructed with mass concrete walls and floor.

Palm tree plantings occur along the north, east and west banks of the Reservoir and function as windbreaks and perimeter plantings. These trees also occur along either side of the carrier canal (which is also currently in the process of being roofed and sealed).

The western bridge is a former rail bridge (associated with siding provided to bring coal for the Pumping Station) which runs diagonally across the Main. It is a simple concrete structure which arches over the pipeline and encloses it completely. This bridge has virtually no features above ground level and is entirely unadorned. This former railway siding, which was originally used to deliver coal to the steam-driven pumping station, now exists only as a remnant perway embankment across the site.

East of this is a simple, single lane vehicular bridge which also runs diagonally across the Main and features short, square decorative concrete corner posts with pyramidal caps and steel tube balustrades running between them. It is otherwise almost identical to the railway bridge but the side panels to the bridge are offset from each other. The third bridge is continuous with the western side of this structure. It is physically identical to the other two bridges but runs at right angles to the direction of the pipeline.

In the northeast corner of the site is a collection of buildings, some associated with the former Pumping Station and the rest representing new office or functional buildings. The original pumping station is an agglomeration of several large steel-framed, gable roofed buildings clad in corrugated iron built abutting each other, representing several expansions of operations over time, plus a second free-standing building of the same materials and design. The southern side of the main building formerly contained large Babcock and Wilcox boilers, whilst the pumping equipment was contained in the northern building and the free-standing building, but all equipment has since been removed. Attached to the southern side of the Boiler House is a former coal bunker, comprising opposing buttressed concrete walls, which is now used to store building materials.

Just north of Reservoir No. 1 are three simple buildings which are remnants of a former caretaker's or groundkeeper's area. The larger building is a small, two roomed building built of timber framing clad in asbestos concrete sheeting with a corrugated iron gable roof. It has a narrow verandah on its southern side beneath the roof overhang and sits on low brick piers. It appears to have been transported complete to this location. There is a large double door centrally on its southern side.

East of this building is a smaller, single-roomed storage shed with corrugated iron cladding and a skillion roof. There appears to have been a garden enclosed by wire-mesh associated with this building. Between these two structures and located to the north of them is a small, timber-framed and asbestos-concrete sheet clad toilet building with a gable roof clad in corrugated iron. It has two adjacent, north-facing cubicles, each with a timber door but a toilet pan is installed only in the eastern cubicle. The western cubicle is used for storage purposes.

Adjacent to the northeast corner of Reservoir No.1 are three simple buildings which are associated with the Pressure Tunnel. The Residential Buildings West of Reservoir No. 1 is a prominent hill, sparsely covered with Eucalyptus trees. All three are single-storey, gable-roofed buildings, but are from different time periods. All three of these buildings are now offices associated with the site and various Sydney Water operations, although the two older buildings were originally constructed as residences. The southernmost of these is a late Federation style, double fronted cottage of brick with a terracotta tiled roof. It is simply decorated, with a roughcast rendered and half-timbered pair of projecting gable ends, brick verandah balustrades and verandah posts and triple casement timber-framed windows with toplights to the front facade. The centre building is also a double-fronted brick cottage with a terracotta tiled roof. Dating from c. 1960s, its roof has hipped gable ends and the projecting bay of the front facade features a curved corner of moulded bricks. The entrance is framed behind a timber screen of open square lattice above a short brick balustrade. The third, northernmost building is a simple rectangular brick building with a hipped gable roof clad in green coloured concrete tiles. Dating from c. 1970s, it has a recessed entrance bay on the northern side with steel verandah posts and a full-height window which returns around the northern corner. On the southern side, a vehicular garage behind a roller shutter door is included within the main building. There are a further two modern demountable buildings located on the north side of this building.

In the centre of the site near the northeastern extremity of Reservoir No. 2, are four buildings which are used as storage sheds and workshop spaces.

Just south of Reservoir No. 1 is a group of four structures which are associated with the City Tunnel.

South of Reservoir No. 1 and separated by a drop in ground level of over 3m, is an area of abandoned industrial buildings which are all in poor condition and are cordoned off from entry. They are the remnants of the former Metallising Depot of the MWS & DB. They are located on either side of a road accessed from Rookwood Road and were formerly isolated from the rest of the Potts Hill Reservoir site. These buildings have no direct association with the Reservoirs and, owing to a high level of industrial contamination, are due to be demolished in the near future.

The site contains many tree plantings and managed bushland areas which serve two primary purposes. The trees are important functionally because they act as windbreaks near the Reservoirs, minimising waves on the water surface which can put extra pressure on the built facilities. The second function was to make the site vegetated, preventing soil erosion and water degradation, whilst managing the environment to prevent bushfires. These practical considerations had the additional benefit of creating an environment attractive to persons employed at the site. Important features include the date palm tree boundary plantings along the Carrier Canal and surrounding much of Reservoir No. 2, the perimeter plantings around Reservoir No. 1 and the managed bushland upon the hill west of Reservoir No. 1. There are scattered pockets of bushland north of Reservoir No. 1, southwest of Reservoir No. 2 and a further patch of open woodland on the western side of the Reservoirs site, encircling the former Plant Workshops. The curtilage boundary for the site has been defined by the various operational precincts as detailed in the "Potts Hill Reservoir Site - Conservation Management Plan" by Godden Mackay Logan. These include: - The Input Distribution Precinct. - The Output Distribution Precinct. - The Reservoir No. 1 Precinct. - The Reservoir No. 2 Precinct.

The Potts Hill Reservoirs site is an operating facility with a range of features dating from 1888 to the present.

=== Modifications and dates ===
- 1888 Completion of the initial stage of Upper Nepean Scheme included at Potts Hill: Reservoir No. 1; 72-inch main from Pipe Head to Potts Hill; screening chamber; and 48-inch main from Potts Hill to Petersham and on to Crown Street Reservoir
- 1893 Second 48-inch main from Potts Hill to Crown Street Reservoir
- 1900 Second 72-inch main from Pipe Head to Potts Hill. 1905 Additional trunk feeders added from Potts Hill: 1 x 30-inch, 24-inch, 20-inch from Potts Hill to the western suburbs and Drummoyne; 1 x 15-inch off the 72-inch main above Potts Hill at Woodville Road to supply part of Granville; 1 x 18-inch from Potts Hill to supply Rookwood
- 1907 Completion of Cataract Dam, which resulted in the Prospect Reservoir becoming the main service reservoir of the system instead of Potts Hill which had been the original main service reservoir of the Upper Nepean Scheme
- 1912 Cottage on Potts Hill constructed to house a supervisor responsible for overseeing the construction of the No. 2 Reservoir. 1912 First installation of plant at the steam pumping station at Potts Hill. 1913 Transfer of screening operations from Potts Hill to Pipe Head. 1919 Proposal to build two cylindrical tubes, each 2.13m diameter, concreted into one tunnel (the Pressure Tunnel) was reviewed by a Board of Experts. Geological investigations were carried out during 1921 and 1922, but in 1923 the twin conduit proposal was abandoned in favour of a single, 3m diameter tube.
- 1923 Work commenced on the Pressure Tunnel with the sinking of seventeen shafts which varied in depth from 45.7m to 115.2m. Work was completed in 1928 and testing was carried out in 1929. Despite extensive failures of the unreinforced concrete lining it was placed in service for the 1929-30 summer. Further testing resulted in the tunnel being declared a failure.
- 1915 - 1927 Additional trunk mains from Potts Hill to provide independently for areas between Potts Hill and Crown Street. 1923 Completion of Reservoir No. 2 at Potts Hill
- 1925 Completion of third 72-inch main to Potts Hill.
- 1927 Completion of 46-inch woodstave main to Potts Hill.
- 1929 - 1930 Completion of pressure tunnel from Potts Hill to Waterloo pumping station.
- 1932 The failure of the Pressure Tunnel resulted in the establishment of a Royal Commission which sat from November 1932 to May 1933.
- 1933 The position of "Resident Engineer Headworks" was created and the incumbent moved into a cottage built for him at Potts Hill.
- 1935 Remedial work involving relining the Pressure Tunnel with steel, coated internally with a spun bituminous substance, was completed and the tunnel was placed in service in November 1935.
- 1937 Completion of 72-inch steel main to replace woodstave main.
- 1946 Commencement of construction of the City Tunnel
- 1948-55 Potts Hill Migrant Camp operates for future Water Board employees.
- 1957 Completion of City Tunnel from Potts Hill to Waterloo.
- 1964 Closure of Potts Hill Steam Pumping Station, reuse for Welding Shop till the 1980s, then used for a store. Completion of new electric Pumping Station at Potts Hill.
- 1962 The Pressure Tunnel was relined using cement. The tunnel was placed back in service in November 1963, the whole project being a major achievement in the in-situ cement lining of large diameter pipelines.
- late 1970s No. 4 main from Pipe Head to Potts Hill, a 120-inch (3m) diameter tunnel, constructed.
- 1993 The Pressure Tunnel was again shut down for inspection.
- 1999 Reservoir No. 2 is reconstructed, lined and covered.

== Heritage listing ==
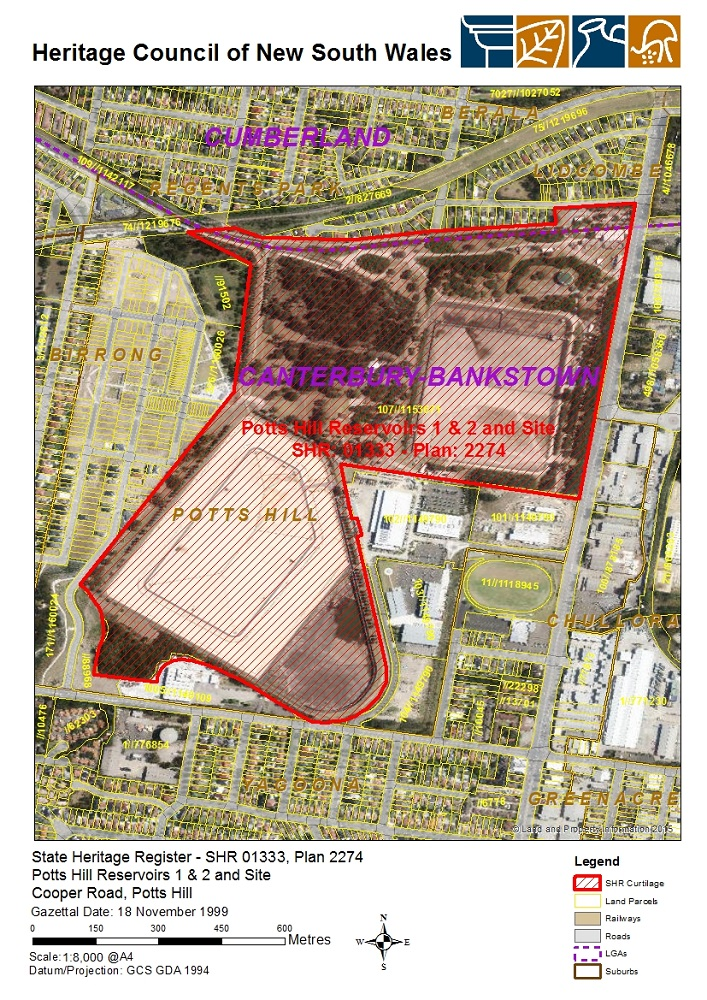
Heritage boundaries

The Potts Hill Water Supply Reservoirs were an integral part of the Upper Nepean Water Supply Scheme, which was crucial to the development and growth of Sydney from the late nineteenth century. The expansion of the complex, including the construction of Reservoir No. 2, demonstrates the growth of the City of Sydney and surrounding suburbs for more than a century. The construction of the Reservoirs was a major achievement in hydraulic technology and associated construction methods for the time and today, the site continues to feature substantial physical evidence of these achievements, including extensive areas of subsurface water reticulation. The complex includes the inlet for an early twentieth-century high pressure tunnel, which was an outstanding engineering feat and was the third largest water supply tunnel in the world for its time. The Reservoirs continue in an important functional role as a distribution centre for Sydney's water supply.

The Potts Hill Reservoirs are situated within a distinctive and attractive cultural landscape, combining functional industrial design, typical turn-of-the-century built features and both natural and exotic plantings. The two reservoirs in combination are rare because of their size, method of construction and proximity. The Potts Hill Reservoirs are an important element in the history of Sydney Water and the site continues to be held in affection and esteem by many generations of Water Board workers. The components of the site which are the most important in terms of the heritage values of the site are: The Carrier Canal and Associated items; Reservoir No.1 and associated items; The telescopic valve tower on the 1200mm Eastern Crossover; Pressure Tunnel Inlet; Pressure Tunnel Access Shaft Building; Suction Well; Surge Tank and Reflux Valve on No.1 Main; No.1 Supply Main Pipeline; No.2 Supply Main pipeline; the Pressure Tunnel; and Landscape Elements.

Potts Hill Reservoirs 1 & 2 was listed on the New South Wales State Heritage Register on 18 November 1999 having satisfied the following criteria.

The place is important in demonstrating the course, or pattern, of cultural or natural history in New South Wales.

Potts Hill Reservoir site is important in the course, or pattern, of NSW's cultural or natural history because: -Reservoir No. 1 was the main component of the original Potts Hill site; -Reservoir No. 1 is a relic of an earlier technological period of Sydney water resource management; -it has essential links with the function and development of Sydney for over 100 years; -the site displays changes in usage through different periods of Sydney water resources management; -Reservoir No. 1 was a major engineering project of its time and a major public work; -it is an important component of the Upper Nepean Water Supply Scheme, one of the largest public works undertaken in Australia; -the walls of Reservoir No. 1 are lined using sandstone block construction, a method which is no longer practised in Australia; -the site still contains remnants of its former pumping station, an element which was essential to the early function of the site; -the position of the Reservoir No. 1 on the highest point in the region displays its original function as a gravity-fed water system; -the site still contains the original pipe head of the Pressure Tunnel, once the most important water pipeline in Sydney; -the site contains many penstocks displaying a range of valve designs which have now been superseded; -it contains an early employee residence which shows the standard of accommodation for water management staff in the early years of the site; -the changing economics and attitudes of the Water Board are represented in the different building styles and standards around the site; -the design of Reservoir No. 1, including its individual parts, demonstrates the attitudes towards water safety current at the time; -the layout of Reservoir No. 1, its surrounds and its security features display the early attitudes towards drinking water quality; -the former pumping station is an example of a functional industrial building of its period; and -Reservoir No. 1 contains the original intake to the Pressure Tunnel leading to Waterloo, which was and still is a major water supply line of Sydney. The site has strong or special association with the life or works of a person, or group of persons, of importance in NSW's cultural or natural history because: -Reservoir No. 2 was the first substantial undertaking by the Metropolitan Board of Water Supply and Sewerage as an independent construction authority; and -Reservoir No. 1 and its associated original features are associated with Edward Orpen Moriarty, the Engineer-in-Chief for Harbours and Rivers responsible for the design and execution of the Upper Nepean Scheme, a person highly significant in the development of the state in terms of public works.

The place is important in demonstrating aesthetic characteristics and/or a high degree of creative or technical achievement in New South Wales.

Potts Hill Reservoir site is important in demonstrating aesthetic characteristics and/or a high degree of creative or technical achievement because: -Reservoir No. 1 and its parts demonstrate a past aesthetic style of public works; -through its materials and use of stylistic motifs in its structural features, Reservoir No. 1 links with other elements of the site and helps to display the original functional arrangements and the changes made to that arrangement; -Reservoir No. 1 is a handsome, well-proportioned structure with landscaped surrounds which together create a very scenic space; -The site is well proportioned with a clearly evident relationship between function, aesthetics and historical layers; -there are several pine and palm tree line plantations which show the importance of landscaping design to the early designers of the site; and -the carrier canal is a well-proportioned feature which relates to palm tree plantings spaced evenly on its sides creating a space of high scenic quality.

The place has a strong or special association with a particular community or cultural group in New South Wales for social, cultural or spiritual reasons.

Potts Hill Reservoir Site has strong or special association with a particular community or cultural group in NSW for social, cultural or spiritual reasons because: - it is considered important by the National Trust of Australia (NSW), which is evidenced by its listing on the National Trust Register; and - is held in high esteem by many generations of Water Board workers.

The place has potential to yield information that will contribute to an understanding of the cultural or natural history of New South Wales.

Potts Hill Reservoir site has potential to yield information that will contribute to an understanding of NSW's cultural or natural history because: -the site has the potential to demonstrate the past technologies of water management and how these have evolved over time; and -Reservoir No. 1 is a good example of a clay core earth embankment stone faced reservoir.

The place possesses uncommon, rare or endangered aspects of the cultural or natural history of New South Wales.

The Potts Hill Reservoirs site is a unique part of the Upper Nepean Scheme and was one of the original components of the Upper Nepean Water Supply Scheme. It contains unique features, including the remains of the steam pumping station, the termini of the Pressure Tunnel and City Tunnel and the former screening chamber.

The place is important in demonstrating the principal characteristics of a class of cultural or natural places/environments in New South Wales.

The Potts Hill Site is representative of the process of water supply for metropolitan Sydney and contains structures and equipment dating from various periods of the site's history which are themselves representative examples of the structures and equipment utilised for water supply throughout the system. The site has historical, functional and aesthetic correlations to water supply facilities at Prospect Reservoir and at Pipehead and the historical use and development of Potts Hill is representative of the overall growth and operation of the system over 120 years.

== See also ==
- Guildford West pipehead and water supply canal
- Potts Hill railway line
