= Cutaway =

Cutaway may refer to:

== Technology ==
- Cutaway (guitar), a feature of some guitar body shapes
- Cutaway (industrial), the display of a manufactured product, where a portion of the exterior housing has been removed to reveal the internal components
- Cutaway drawing, a type of drawing based on the design technique to cut away part of the outside to show some of the inner work
- Cutaway van chassis, an incomplete vehicle for further assembly by a manufacturer of conversion vans, RVs, ambulances, etc.
- Cut-away, disconnecting a parachute that has malfunctioned

== Film ==
- Cutaway (2000 film), with Tom Berenger, Maxine Bahns, Stephen Baldwin and others
- Cutaway (2014 film), directed by Kazik Radwanski
- Cutaway (filmmaking), a film-making technique

== Other uses ==
- Cutaway, a flying trapeze trick
- Morning coat, also called a cutaway, a type of formal coat
- The Cutaway, an events space in Barangaroo, Sydney, New South Wales, Australia
