= Wynyard Walk =

Pedestrian walkway in Sydney

- Wynyard Walk Tunnel
- Interactive map of Wynyard Walk

Overview
- Other name: Wynyard Walk Tunnel
- Location: Sydney central business district, New South Wales, Australia
- Coordinates: 33°51′56″S 151°12′19″E
- Crosses: Clarence Street; Margaret Street; Kent Street
- Start: Wynyard station
- End: Barangaroo

Operation
- Constructed: 2012–2016
- Opened: 20 November 2016
- Traffic: Pedestrian only

Technical
- Design engineer: Woods Bagot; Thiess
- Length: 180 metres (590 ft)
- Width: 9 metres (30 ft)

The Wynyard Walk is a 180-metre-long (590 ft) pedestrian link and tunnel between Wynyard station and Barangaroo in the Sydney central business district. The walkway was officially opened on 20 September 2016. Wynyard Walk provides a quick and safe route and has increased the entry and exit capacity of Wynyard station to meet demand as Barangaroo is redeveloped. An estimated 20,000 pedestrians per hour can walk through the tunnel. In 2009, prior to construction of Barangaroo, the pedestrian tunnel was estimated to cost $100 million.

Under a 7-year agreement from 2023 onwards, the tunnel is branded as Westpac Walk for sponsorship reasons.

== Construction ==
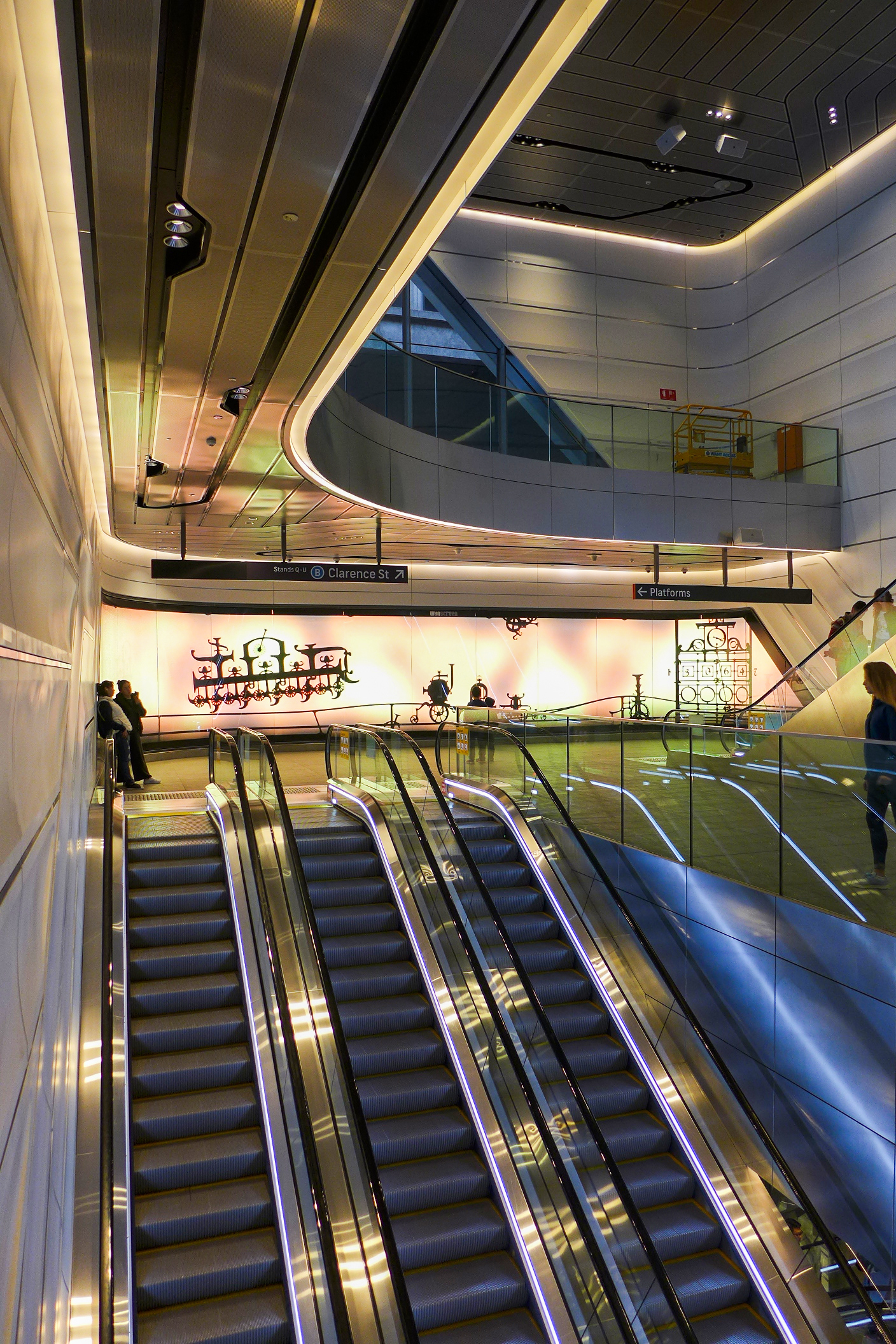
Wynyard Walk atrium

The project involved the construction of:

- a five-storey entry building to Wynyard station (three storeys below ground and two above)
- an approximately 180-metre-long (590 ft) and 9-metre-wide (30 ft) underground fully accessible pedestrian tunnel situated approximately 2.5 metres (8.2 feet) under existing tunnels
- a pedestrian bridge over Sussex Street
- a public plaza area, Napoleon Plaza to provide an upgraded pedestrian precinct

The construction contract was awarded to Thiess in September 2012. In early 2014, construction at the Western Portal was put on hold to allow archaeologists to work on the site to preserve significant European and indigenous artefacts unearthed during excavation.

On 19 October 2015, a new pedestrian bridge over Sussex Street was opened to provide a direct route into Barangaroo. Following completion of the walk on 20 September 2016, the plaza created between Sussex Street and the tunnel, was named Napoleon Plaza, to reflect the connection to Francis Girard, who was thought responsible for the naming of the nearby Napoleon Street and who whose flour mill and wharf were nearby.

== Adjoining buildings ==
The Wynyard Walk connects pedestrians from Barangaroo through to Wynyard station - and continues through Wynyard Place (with exits on George Street) and on to the Hunter Connection (with exits on Pitt Street and Hunter Street).

The thoroughfare to George Street was rebuilt as part of the Wynyard Place development.
