= Sydney Harbour Control Tower =

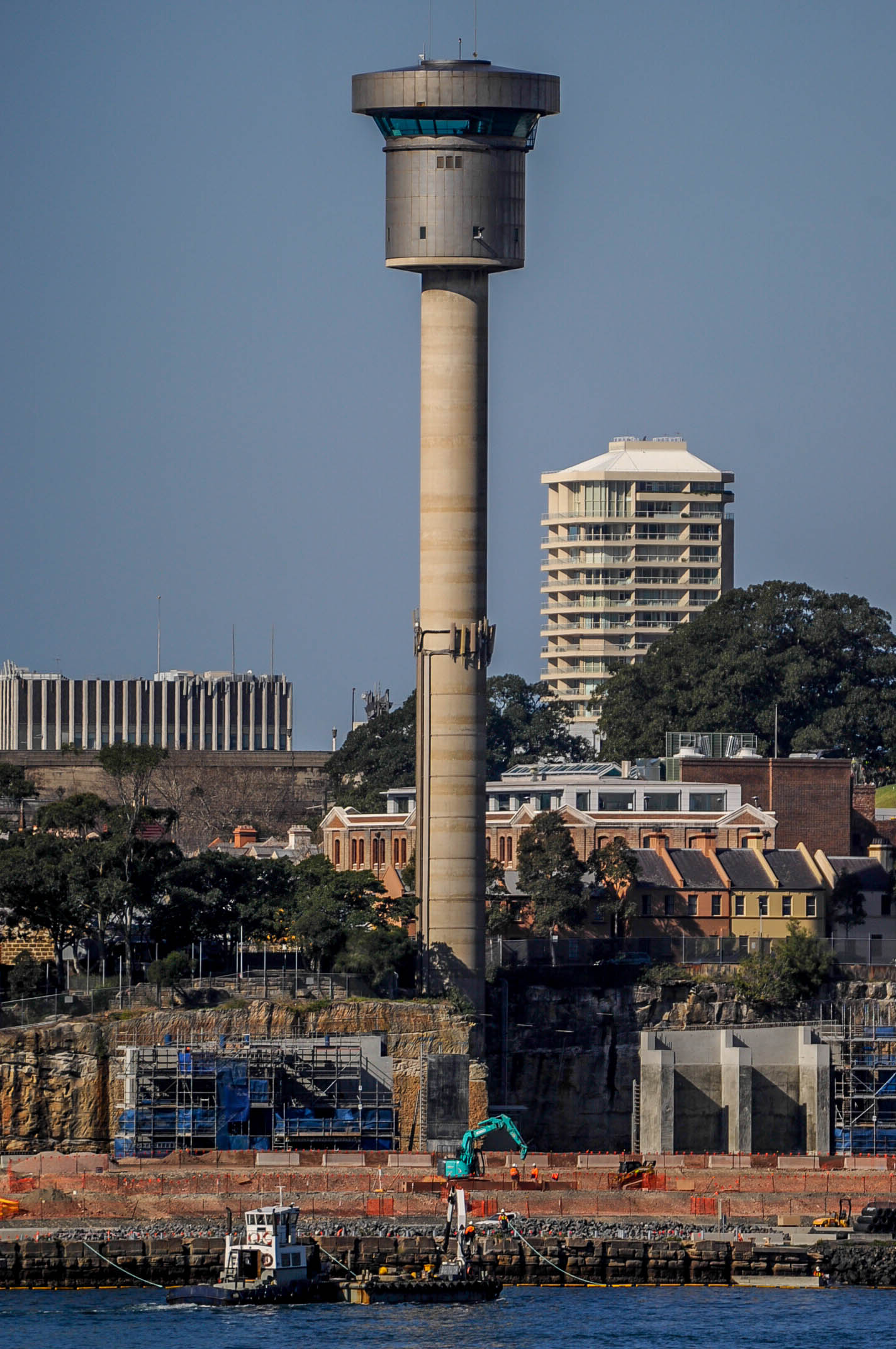

General information
- Type: Tower
- Location: Millers Point, Sydney, Australia
- Opened: 1974
- Closed: 2011
- Demolished: 2016
- Owner: Roads & Maritime Services

Height
- Height: 87 metres

Technical details
- Material: Reinforced concrete
- Floor count: 3

Design and construction
- Architecture firm: Edwards Madigan Torzillo & Briggs
- Developer: Maritime Services Board
- Main contractor: Sabemo

The Sydney Harbour Control Tower oversaw vessel movements on Sydney Harbour, Australia from 1974 until 2011. It was demolished in 2016.

== History ==
The Sydney Harbour Control Tower was opened in 1974 by the Maritime Services Board as part of the redevelopment of Darling Harbour as a container port. The site was selected as it had views of all of the main shipping channels of Sydney Harbour. The 87-metre (285 ft) tower was built overlooking Walsh Bay and Darling Harbour. It had a cylindrical reinforced concrete column with a circular stainless steel and glass cabin with three floors.

With the transfer of container shipping operations to Port Botany, the tower closed in 2011, with ownership transferred from Roads & Maritime Services to the Barangaroo Delivery Authority in 2012. It was demolished in 2016 as part of the Barangaroo redevelopment.
