= Barangaroo, New South Wales =

Barangaroo
- Suburb
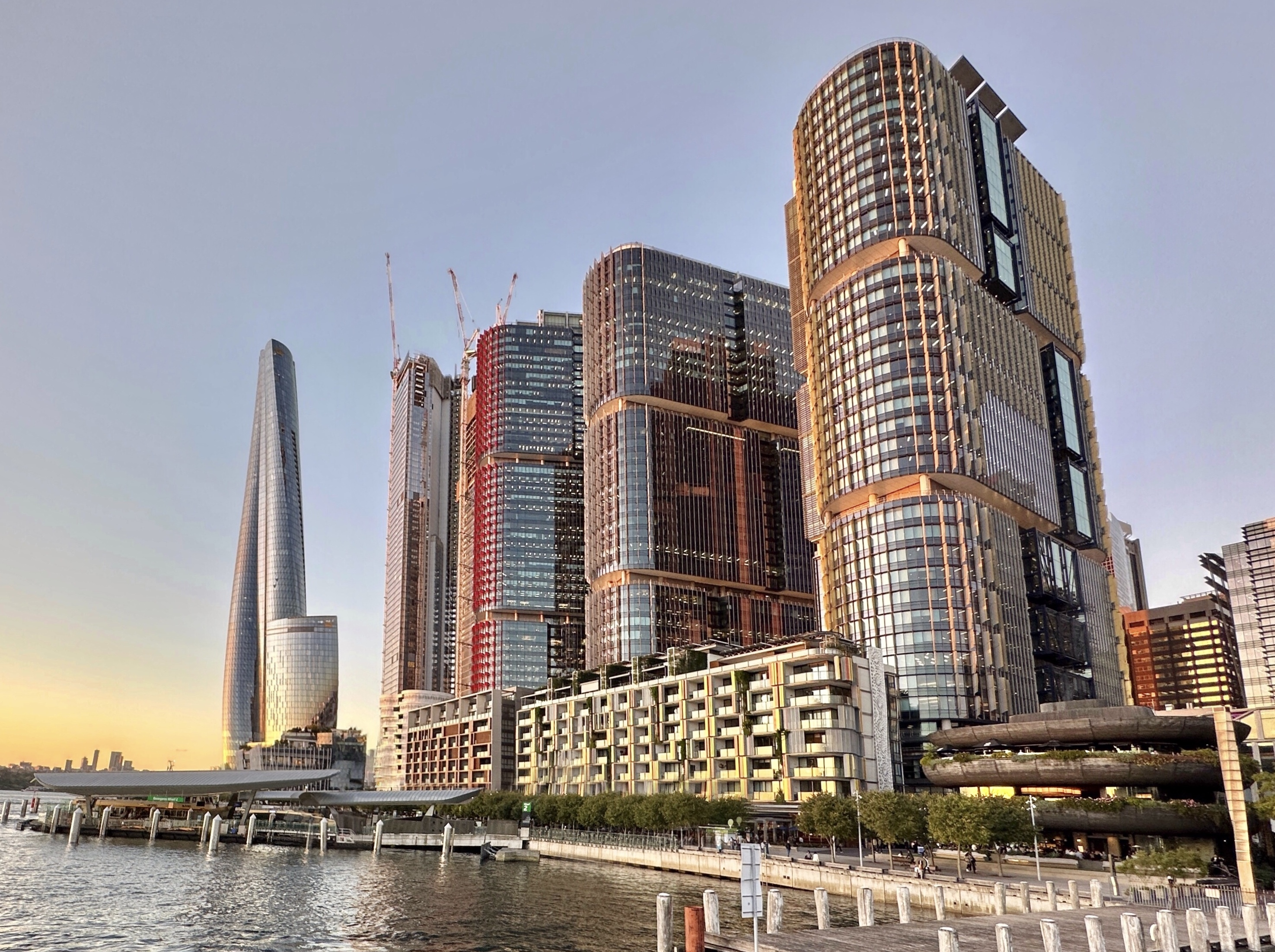
- Barangaroo waterfront

- Interactive map of Barangaroo
- Country: Australia
- State: New South Wales
- City: Sydney
- LGA: City of Sydney
- Location: 1 km (0.62 mi) north-west of Sydney CBD
- Established: 1788 as Cockle Bay Point; 1820s as Millers Point; 2007 as Barangaroo

Government
  - State electorate: Sydney
  - Federal division: Sydney

Area
  - Total: 0.22 km^{2} (0.085 sq mi)

Population
  - Total: 220 (SAL 2021)
  - Density: 1,000/km^{2} (2,600/sq mi)
- Postcode: 2000
- County: Cumberland
- Parish: St. Philip
Suburbs around Barangaroo
	Millers Point	Dawes Point
Darling Harbour	Barangaroo	The Rocks
	Sydney CBD

Barangaroo is an area of central Sydney, Australia. It is at the north-western edge of the Sydney central business district and the southern end of the Sydney Harbour Bridge. It is part of the local government area of the City of Sydney. The area was used for fishing and hunting by Indigenous Australians prior to colonial settlement. The area is inclusive of The Hungry Mile, the name harbourside workers gave to the docklands area of Darling Harbour East during the Great Depression, where workers would walk from wharf to wharf in search of a job, often failing to find one.

In 2003 the Government of New South Wales determined that the precinct would be redeveloped from shipping and stevedoring facilities to provide more commercial office space and recreational areas. This redevelopment moved from design contest to concept plan from 2005 to 2012. In the interim, stevedoring facilities have been relocated, some of the site remediated, and temporary alternate uses such as major events implemented, pending major development. The site is managed by an agency of the NSW Government, called the Barangaroo Delivery Authority.

Redevelopment commenced in 2012 and was expected to be entirely completed by 2023. The redevelopment involves parkland with several new apartment buildings, as well as a metro station, hotel, "cultural space" and casino.

== History ==
This area was of importance to Wallangang Aboriginal Cadigal people as a hunting and fishing region. Large shell middens and numerous rock engravings close to the site indicate indigenous occupation dating back around 6,000 years, while radiocarbon dates from other parts of Sydney indicate that the wider area was occupied for at least 14,500 years prior to non-indigenous settlement, from 1788. It is not clear what mobility indigenous people had during seasons.

Following a public competition in 2006, the East Darling Harbour area was renamed in October 2007 in honour of Barangaroo, a Kamaraygal woman who was the second wife of Bennelong, an interlocutor between the Aboriginal people and the early British colonists in New South Wales. She did not, however agree with Bennelong working with the colonial government. Watkin Tench, a marine from the First Fleet, in his first-hand account called A Complete Account of the Settlement at Port Jackson, describes one such encounter with Barangaroo:

"Not seeing Barangaroo of the party, I asked for her, and was informed that she had violently opposed Bennelong's departure. When she found persuasion vain, she had recourse to tears, scolding, and threats, stamping the ground, and tearing her hair. But Baneelon continuing determined, she snatched up in her rage one of his fish-gigs, and dashed it with such fury on the rocks, that it broke. To quiet her apprehensions on the score of her husband's safety, Mr. Johnson, attended by Abaroo, agreed to remain as a hostage until [Bennelong] should return".

The suburb now known as Barangaroo was for 200 years the community of Millers Point and known by that name as "Millers Point". Briefly the point at its northern end was named Barangaroo Point until this was determined to be inaccurate by the Geographical Names Board, and the name historic Millers Point was reinstated. It appears Millers Point may have been known in the local Aboriginal language as Ilkan maladul. There is one record that this phrase was recorded by a linguist marine Lieutenant William Dawes on a sketch map inside the front cover of his first language notebook, dated to 1790.

=== European settlement ===
At the time of European and indigenous contact, Governor Phillip estimated that there were about 1500 Aboriginal people inhabiting the coastal area of Botany Bay, Port Jackson and Broken Bay. The population reduced dramatically with the introduction of smallpox into Sydney's Aboriginal community in the first years of European settlement. More than half of Sydney's indigenous population is believed to have died in the smallpox epidemic of 1789. Originally known as Cockle Bay Point during the early years of the Sydney colony, little activity or settlement took place in the area. Then in the 1820s windmills were built out on what was to become known as Millers Point and European settlers started constructing houses and building a small village. In the 1830s the first wharf was constructed in the area immediately bringing more people to the nascent villages around two public houses. In 1843 the Australian Gas Light Company finished building and began operating a gas works in East Darling Harbour. This was the beginning of major residential and dockland development in the area as employees needed to be housed near the works. The works also brought more commercial shipping into the harbour as the coal for the works had to be delivered by boat.

In 1859 a direct route from The Rocks to Millers Point was created, called the Argyle Cut. This made the journey back and forth from the main colony much safer and quicker. The route was a major catalyst for development in east Darling Harbour and Millers Point.

=== Early shipping era to 1960s ===
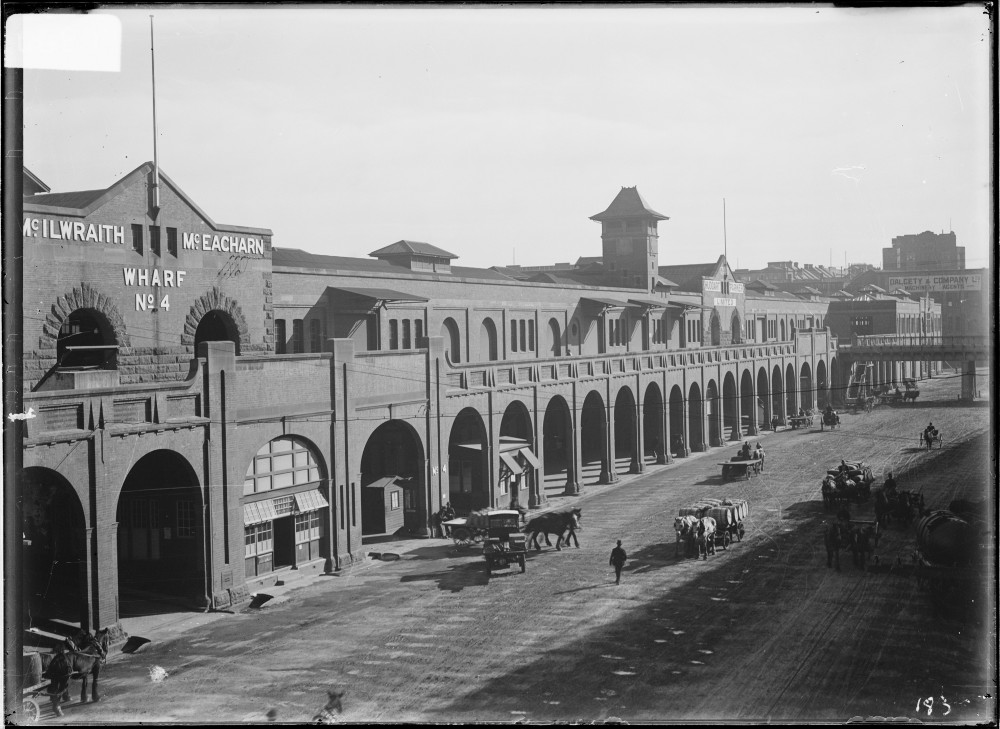
Wharves on Hickson Road circa 1920

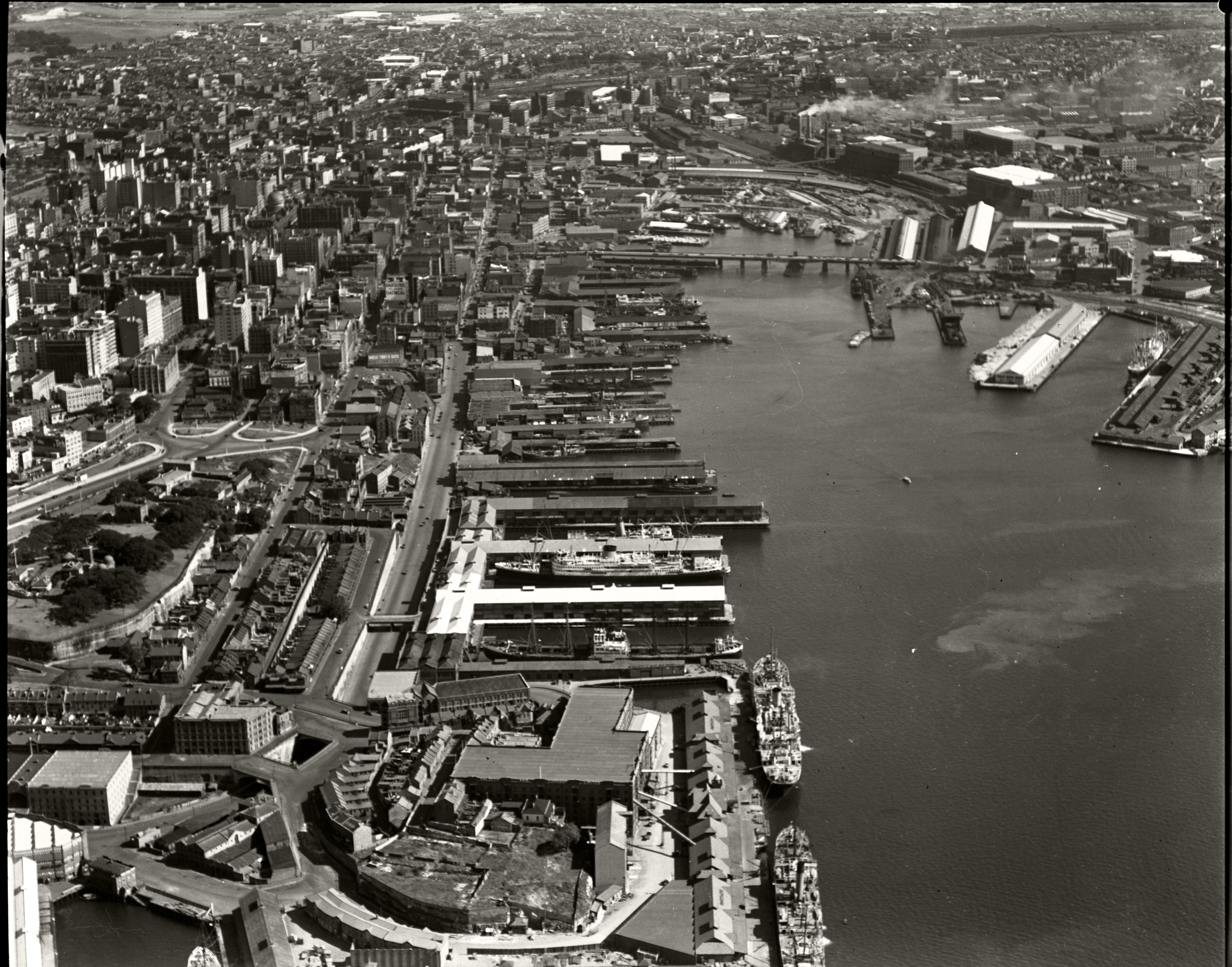
Aerial view of the wharves in 1937

From the 1850s to the 1880s the docks and shipyards in East Darling Harbour multiplied tremendously, going from a coal and ferry drop off point to a hub of commercial shipping activity. During the gold rush, labour shortages plagued the docks as most poor labourers headed out to the gold fields in Victoria to strike it rich. The companies had to become more flexible in meeting worker demands so they offered better pay and working conditions to workers who stayed in Sydney. In the 1860s storage facilities and warehouses had to be built out on Millers Point to accommodate the massive number of bulk goods flowing through the port. By the 1870s the waterfront was covered in warehouses and storage depots, mostly holding the treasured export of the time, wool.

From 1880 to 1900 specialisation of the area occurred. Shipyards closed down in favour of storage facilities and bigger wharfs to accommodate contemporary ships with larger cargo loads were built. The skilled ship builders were therefore out of a job and had to find work elsewhere, while more unskilled workers were needed to fill stevedoring positions. This shifted the demographics of the area significantly, turning it from a mix of skilled and unskilled workers to a working-class neighbourhood.

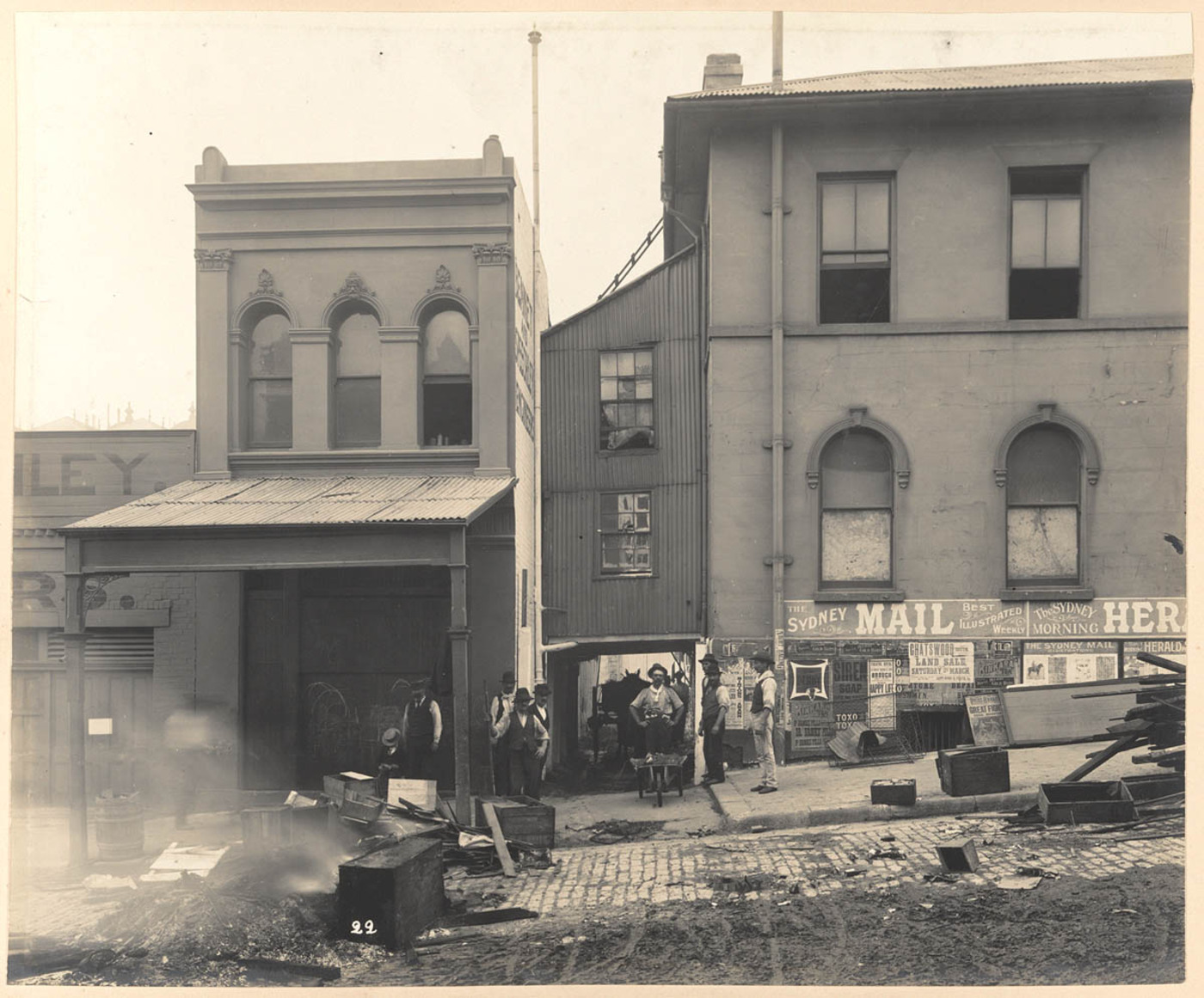
A laneway at the side of Sussex Street during the bubonic plague outbreak in Sydney, 1900.

The arrival of the bubonic plague in Sydney in 1900 was cause for alarm on the docks. It also provided convenient grounds for mass resumptions of houses in preparation for reshaping the landscape of The Rocks, Dawes Point and Millers Point. Mass areas of Sydney were fenced off and people deported to North Head to be quarantined. Shipping operations were shut down for a period of time while Council decontaminated the area and exterminated disease ridden rats. During this time the ownership of the port was shifted from individually owned private wharfs to the Sydney Harbour Trust. The trust dismantled the inadequate and unsafe docks and built finger wharfs large enough to facilitate large modern ships. By the end of the 1930s construction was complete, the wharfs dominated the waterfront from Millers point down to Darling Harbour.

The Great Depression gave East Darling Harbour and dock areas surrounding it a poignant nickname, The Hungry Mile. During this period great masses of workers would line up down the mile long stretch of wharfs and wait for work. Clerks chose the workers based on the a system where the fitter men were chosen over the weaker, and where socialist troublemakers were sidelined in favour of willing workers. This brutal system made for a very adversarial environment which polarised the community at large. They erupted occasionally in protest, most famously refusing to load a boat with scrap metal bound for Japan on the eve of World War II.

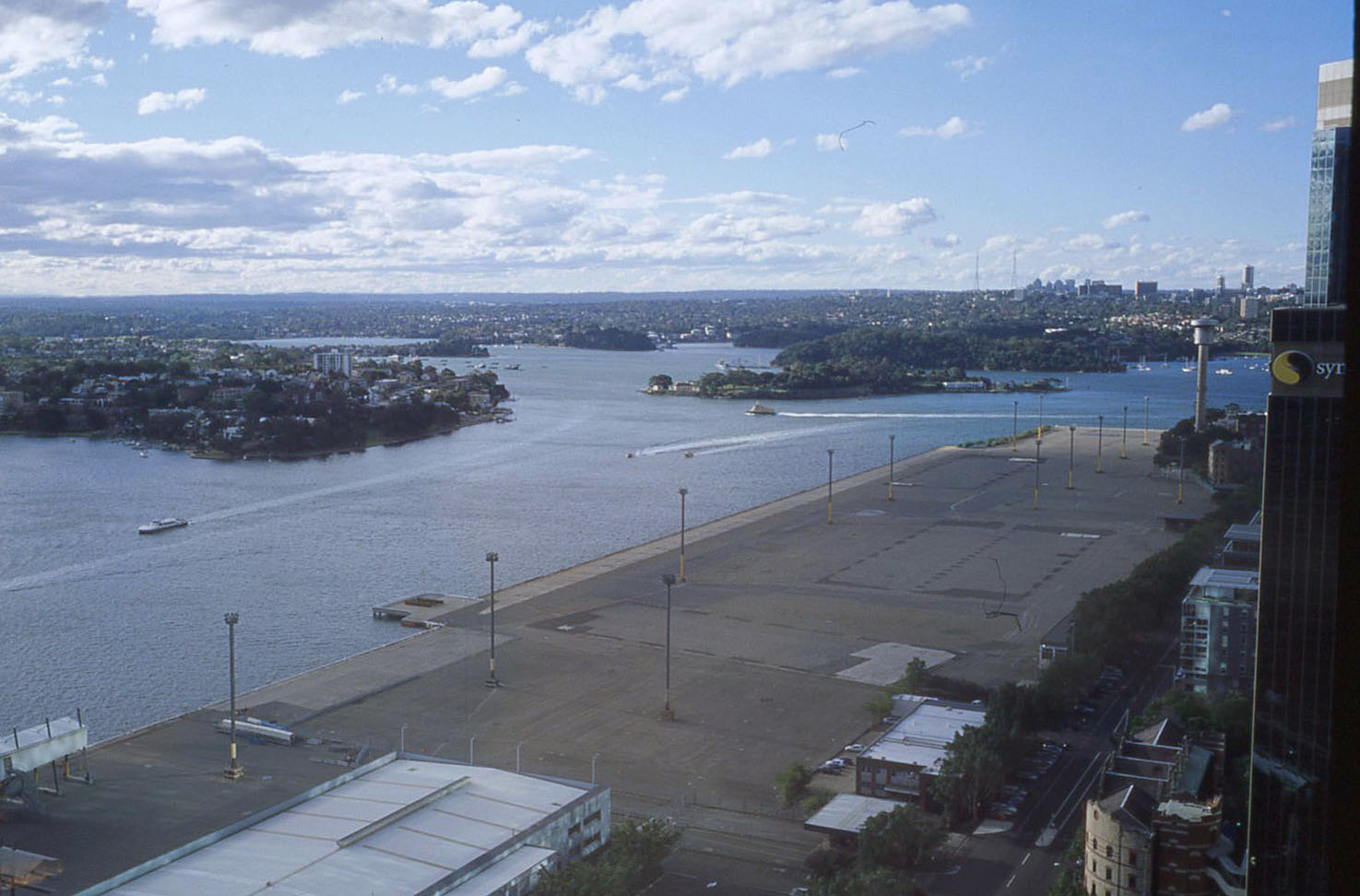
The undeveloped area in 2009

=== Modern shipping era to redevelopment ===
By the 1950s, ships had become too big for the now inadequately small finger wharfs of East Darling Harbour. Standardized shipping container sizes had eliminated the need for bulk offloading. One crane operator could now do the work of 50 men. The whole of what is known today as South Barangaroo was turned into a massive concrete apron, the northern end followed similarly in the 1970s. Flaws in the site's modern shipping capability started to show. The lack of a heavy rail link or a b-double capable road limited the port's capacity in processing in and outbound cargo. As container ships got bigger this problem only got worse. The ultimate demise of commercial shipping in Darling Harbour, and ultimately Sydney Harbour as a working harbour, was the construction of Port Botany in 1979 and the expansion of port facilities at Port Kembla and Newcastle. With excellent rail, road and air connections to the port, along with massive capacity for expansion and the ability to handle large container ships, it progressively became the main port of Sydney.

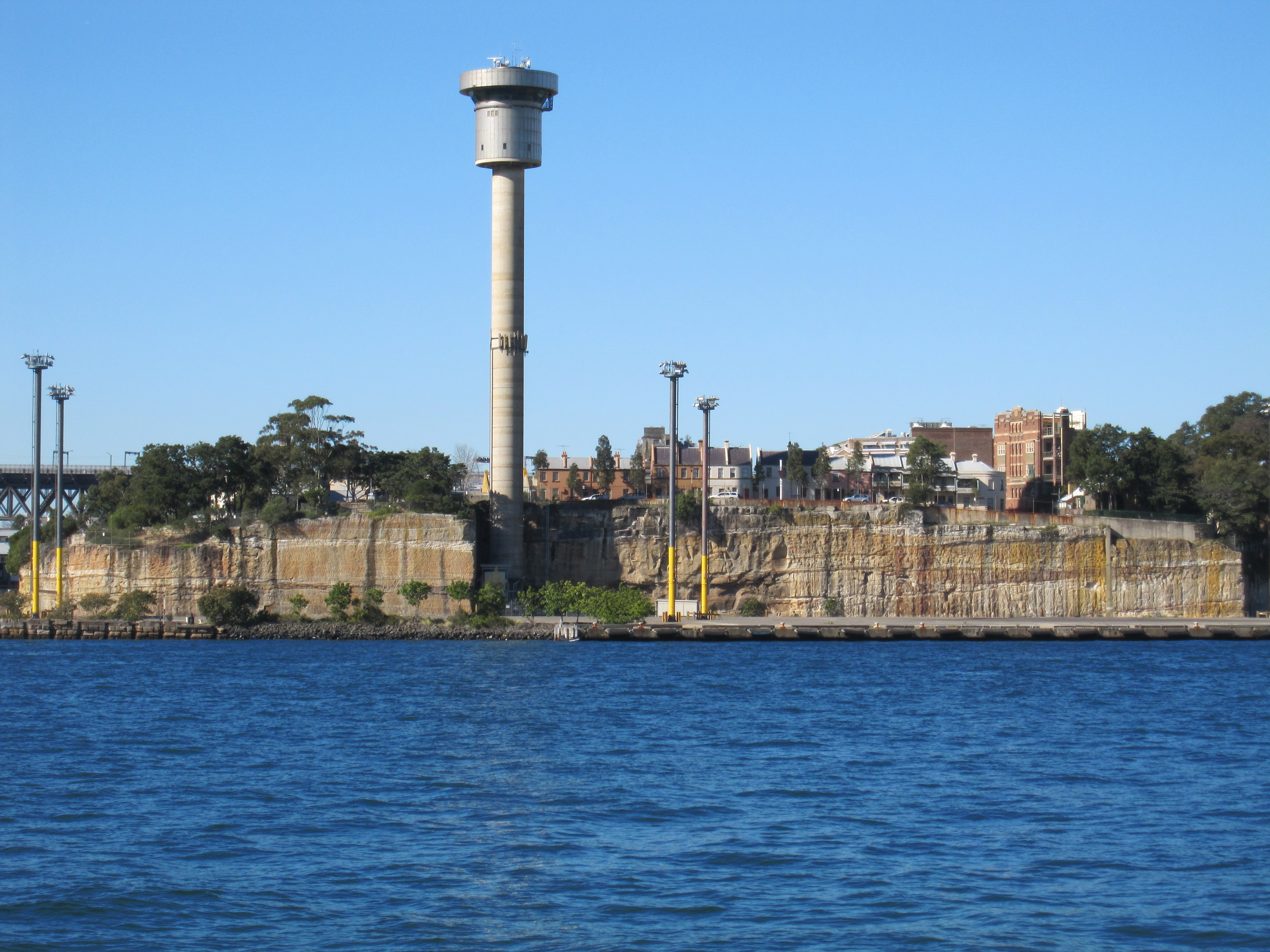
A campaign to save the Sydney Harbour Control Tower, long considered an eye sore, for its maritime heritage ultimately failed with the redevelopment of Barangaroo Reserve

The wharfs had been unusually free of union activity from the beginning of World War II up until the mid-1990s, with high wages and a steady stream of jobs. In 1996, the Howard government was elected into power promising industrial relations reform. In 1997, the Workplace Relations Act, 1996 limited the bargaining power of unions and sidelined the Australian Industrial Relations Commission's ability to mediate negotiations as well as introducing statutory employee contracts. In 1998, Patrick Stevedoring laid off all its workers and liquidated its assets after encountering backlash from the unions for the new workplace contracts taking advantage of the new legislation. But the very next day when work was expected to grind to a halt, everything was proceeding as if nothing happened.

In 2003, with the stevedoring companies set to move out within three years, the Government of New South Wales designated the site for redevelopment into parklands and commercial space. An international design contest was launched in 2005 attracting 139 submissions from around the world. The winning design by Hill Thalis Architecture + Urban Projects, Paul Berkemeier Architects and Jane Irwin Landscape Architecture was announced in March 2006 together with a naming competition for the new precinct. In October 2006, the Minister for Planning, Frank Sartor, announced that the area will be renamed as Barangaroo. In late 2006 Patrick Corporation, who leased the site from the New South Wales Government, moved their stevedoring operations to Port Botany. This put an end to almost 130 years of cargo shipping operations in eastern Darling Harbour.

Before the precinct's redevelopment, Barangaroo was a World Youth Day 2008 site used for the opening mass for an estimated 150,000 people, concerts, a re-enactment of the Stations of the Cross and for the arrival of Pope Benedict XVI to Sydney. A passenger terminal for cruise liners was temporarily located at Barangaroo, prior to construction of the White Bay Cruise Terminal. The Barangaroo Foreshore is also available for events during construction.

== Redevelopment ==
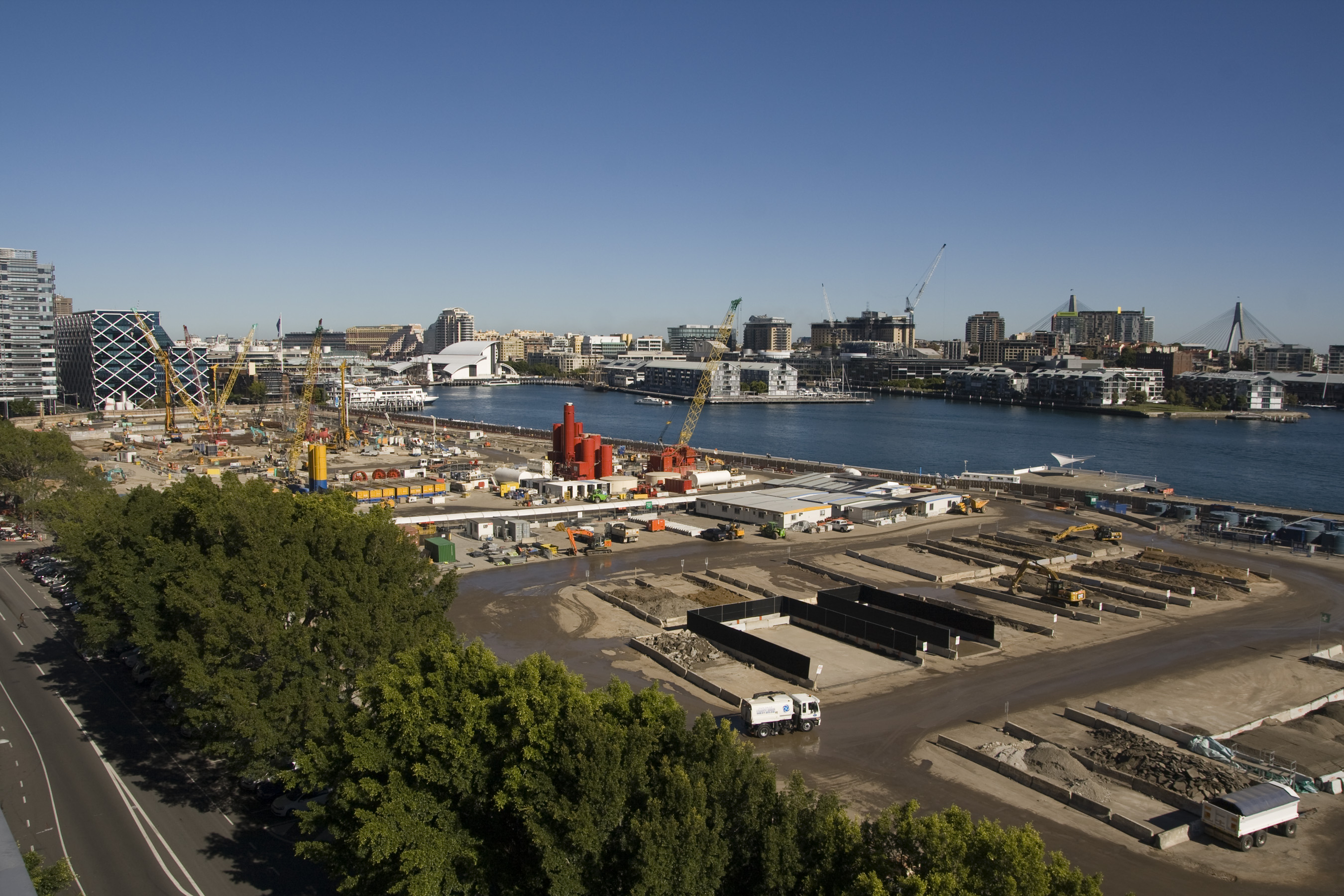
Initial site works in May 2012

Initially placed in the hands of Sydney Harbour Foreshore Authority, the Barangaroo Delivery Authority was established pursuant to the Barangaroo Delivery Authority Act, 2009 No 2 to facilitate a high quality commercial and mixed use precinct at Barangaroo balancing social, economic and environment outcomes, including the establishment of a headland park and other public domains; among other objectives. Supporting the Authority is a Design Excellence Review Panel that comprised Paul Keating (Chairman from 2005 until 2011), Chris Johnson, Bridget Smyth, Oi Choong, James Weirick, Angelo Candalepas, and Leo Schofield (resigned 2011). The role of the Panel was to guide the government authority on a range of design issues, such as architecture, landscape and culture. Commissioned initially in 2005, the Panel was instrumental in the selection of Hill Thalis Architecture as the winning the international design competition in 2006. The winning team was commissioned to assist the Government in developing the design during the latter part of 2006. There was early debate regarding the design and size of waterfront developments. The City of Sydney and some architectural bodies expressed concern that the proposed designs would be out of scale with the surrounding environment, as well as causing large unwanted shadows over the immediate area, parts of Darling Harbour and possibly nearby Pyrmont.

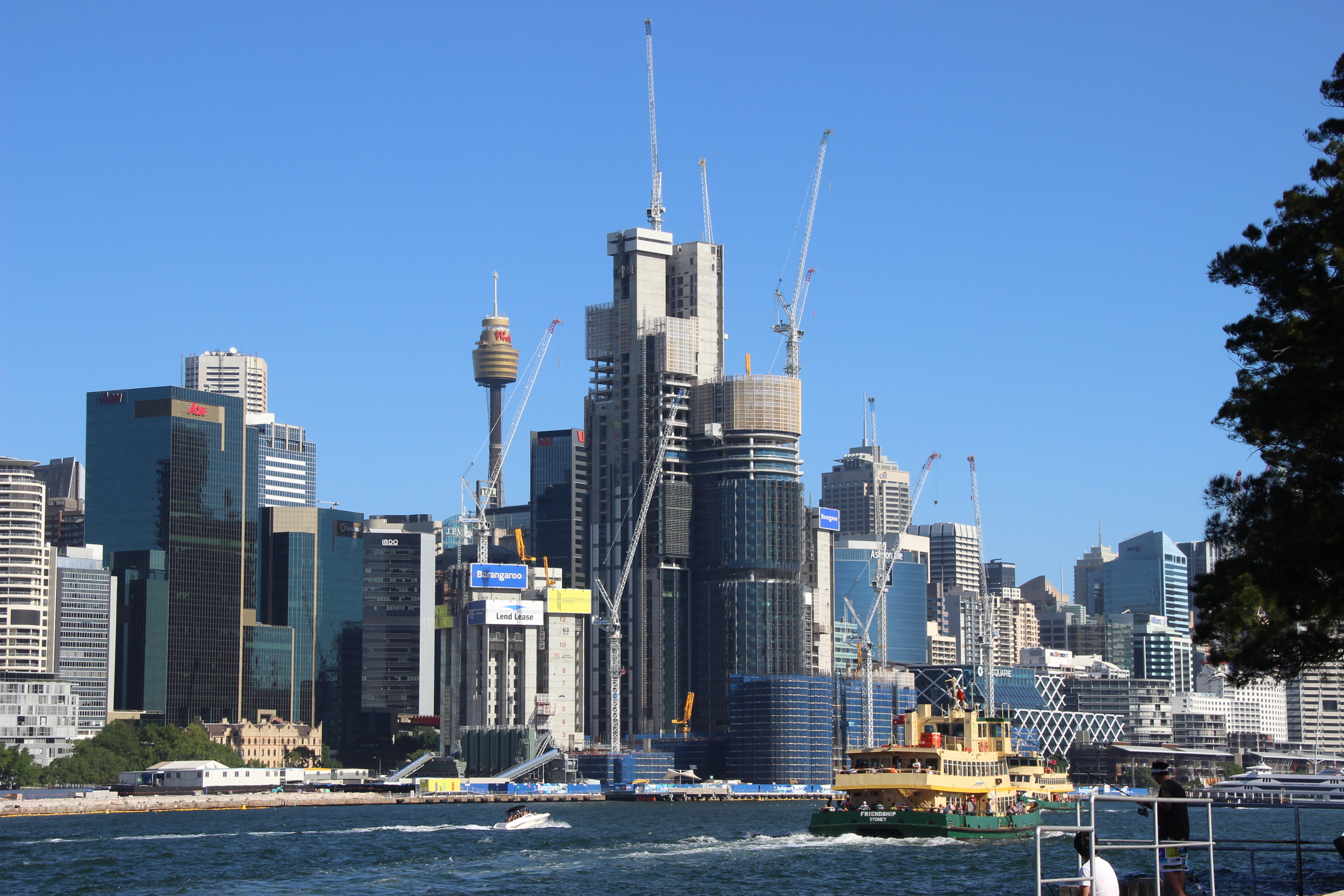
View of Barangaroo South from Balmain East in December 2014

A concept plan was released by the Government in 2007 and a year later announced that it had shortlisted consortia led by Brookfield Multiplex, Lendlease and Mirvac. In 2009, to assist with the economic viability of the project, the Government announced that the amount of commercial office space would increase by one third, allowing an additional 120,000 square metres (1,291,669 sq ft) from the initial concept plan for the A$6 billion development. In late 2009, after a further shortlisting process, the Government announced that it would not proceed with Hill Thalis' winning design, choosing instead a consortium that included lead architect Lord Rogers and developer, Lendlease, who controversially proposed a 230 metres (755 ft) tall hotel to be constructed 150 metres (492 ft) into Darling Harbour, as well as parkland and commercial offices. When plans were put on public display during 2010 it was claimed that the development exceeded planning height and footprint limits. Following public outcry at changes to the original Concept Plan, community-based organisations such as the Friends of Barangaroo, Australians for Sustainable Development and the Barangaroo Action Group formed, colloquially referring to the precinct as "the Greedy Mile". In March 2010, the Government and Lendlease entered into provisional contracts for the development of the site, subject to Ministerial approval which was given in May 2010. Concerned about the lack of transparency, in September 2010 Clover Moore, who was both Lord Mayor of the City of Sydney and Member for Sydney in the state parliament, resigned as a director of the Barangaroo Delivery Authority.

On attaining Government in March 2011, Premier Barry O'Farrell announced an independent review into the selection processes. The panel reported in August 2011 and stated that two members of a design panel had a conflict of duty. O'Farrell also overturned an amendment to planning legislation made in the last days of the previous government that placed the Barangaroo site as exempt from remediation of contaminated sites requirements. The Government has also asked Lendlease to move the hotel off the harbour as a gesture of goodwill, even though it has planning approval from the Keneally government. As of January 2012, discussions with the developer were still ongoing.

=== Precincts ===
The redevelopment project comprises three precincts: Barangaroo South, Barangaroo Central and Barangaroo Reserve.

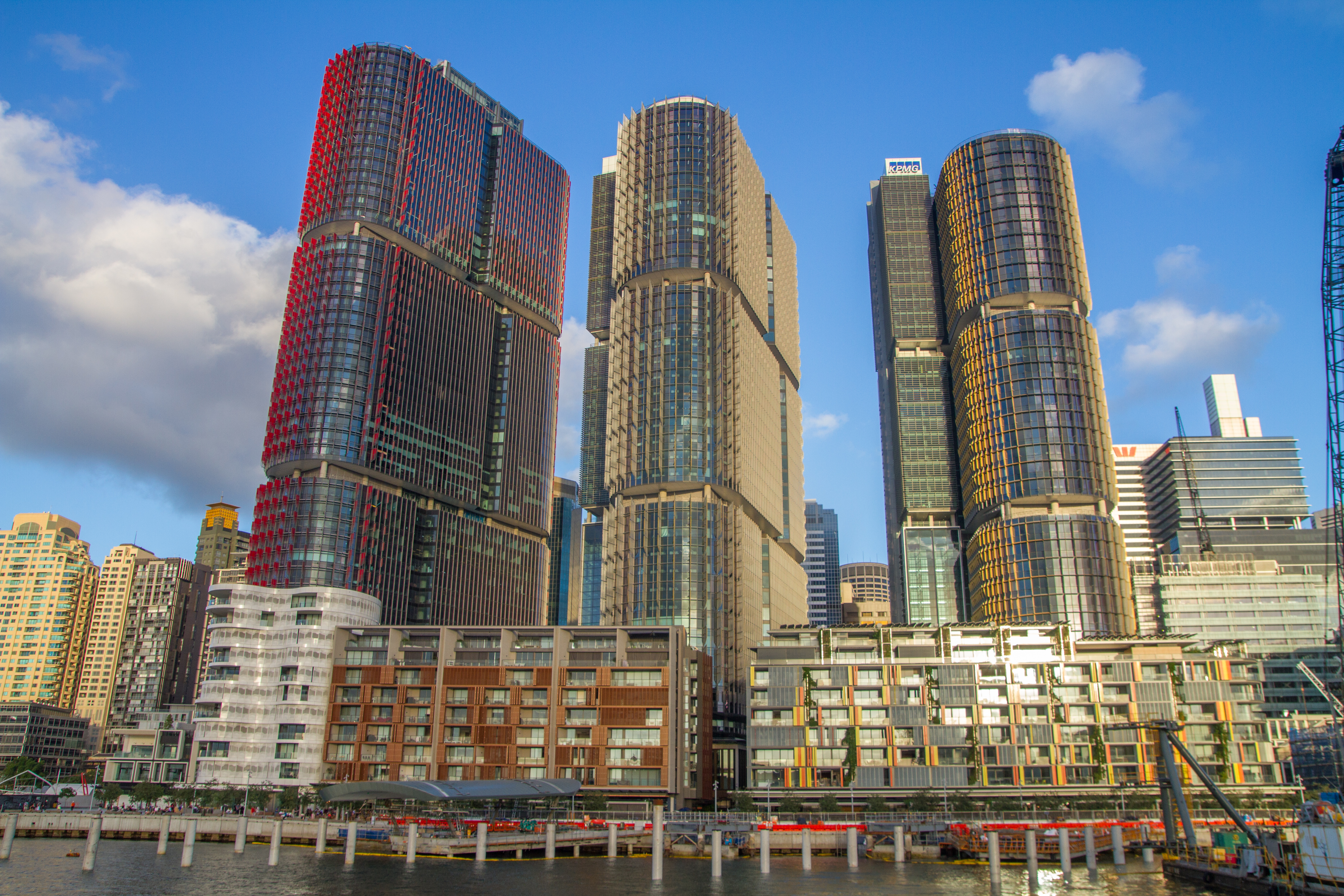
The International Towers in 2017

==== Barangaroo South ====
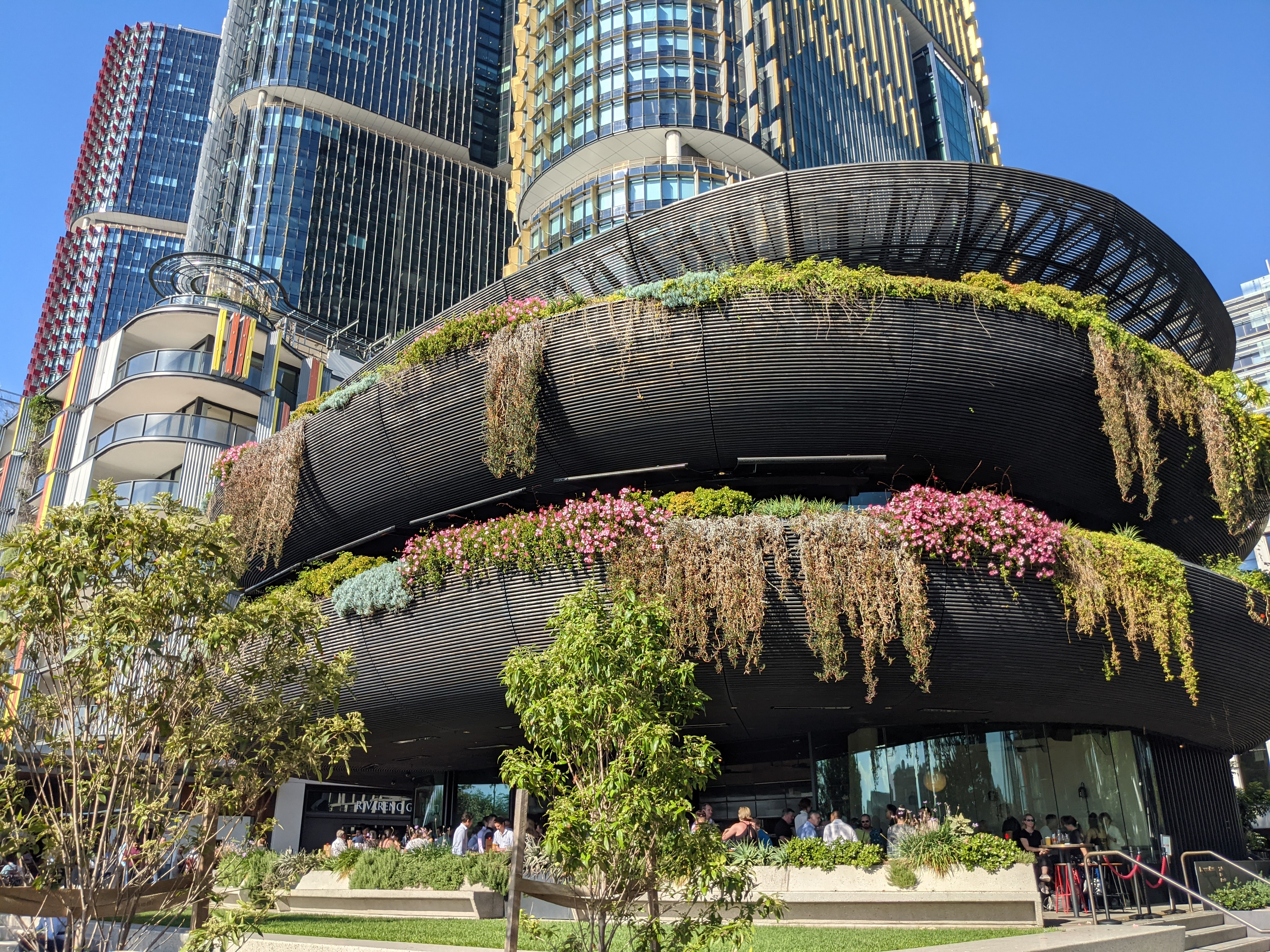
Barangaroo House

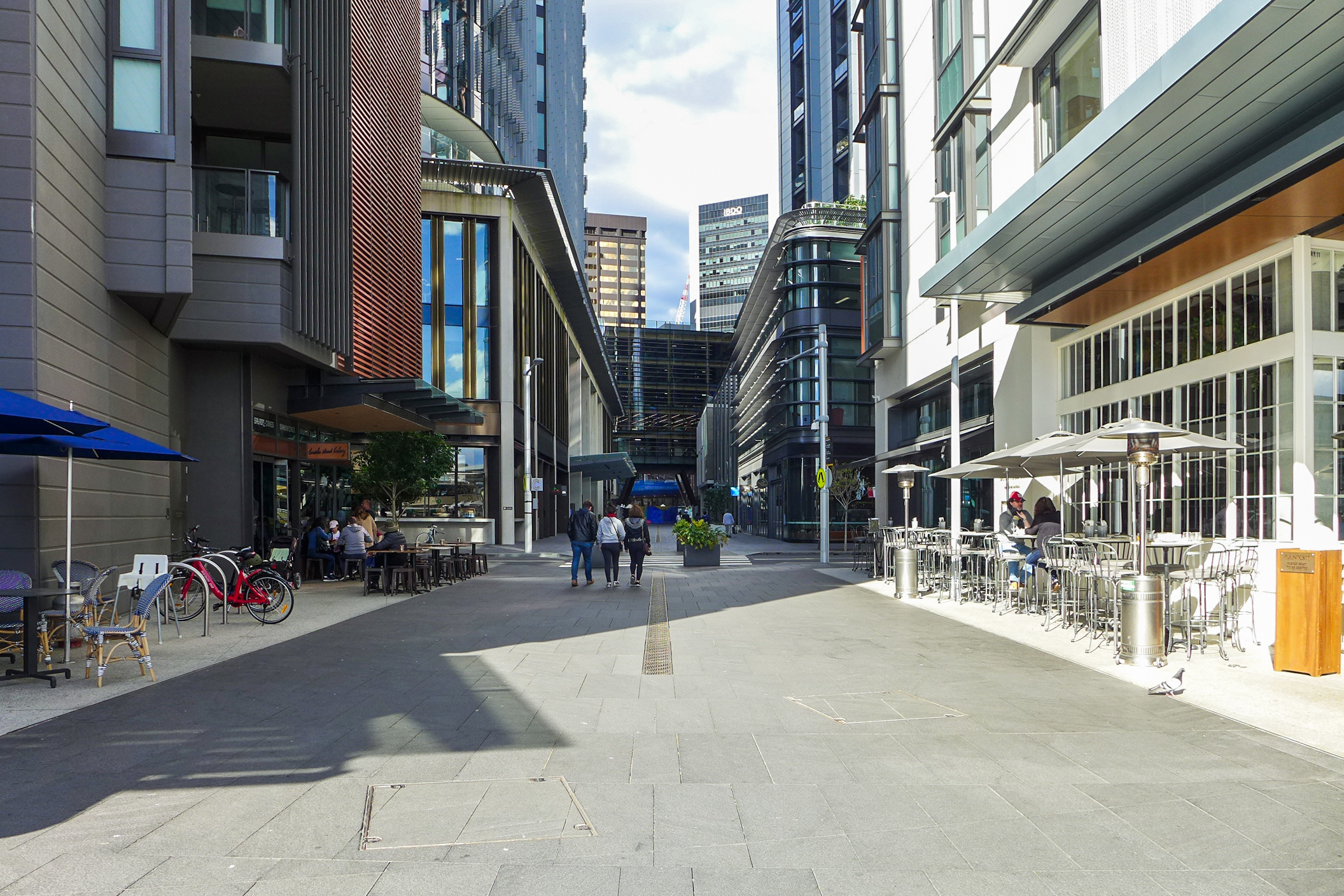
Mercantile Walk

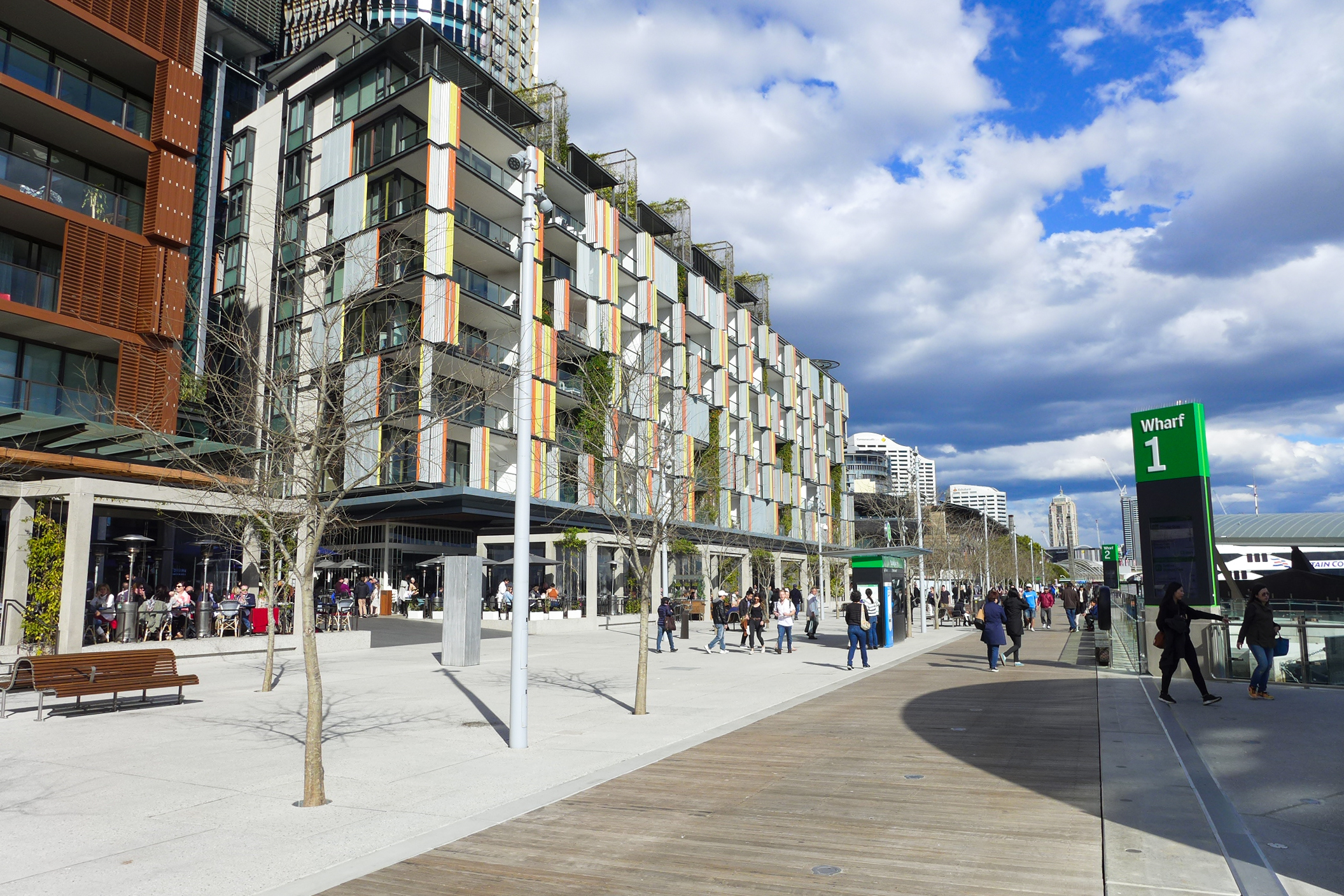
Wulugul Walk

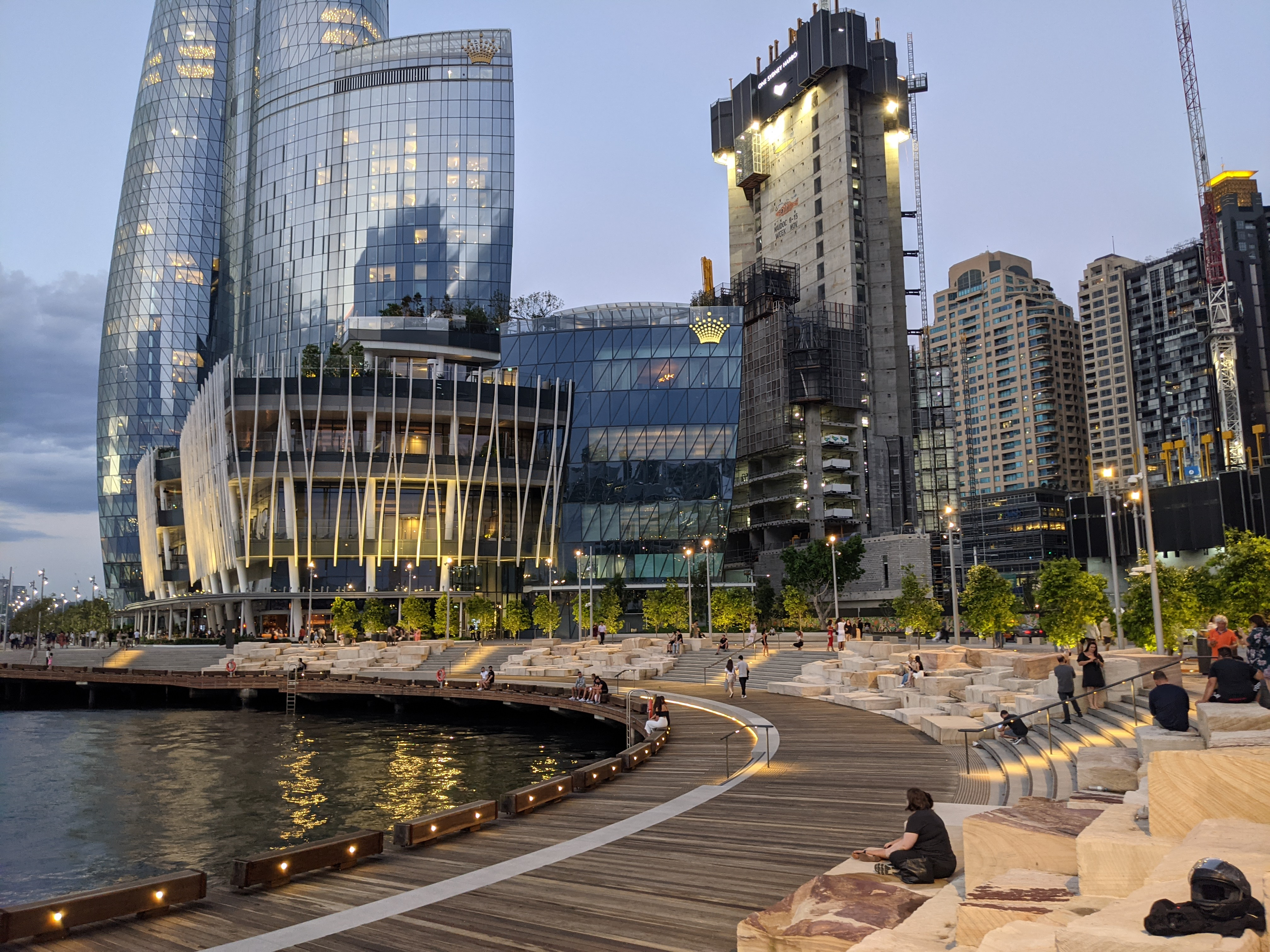
Watermans Cove

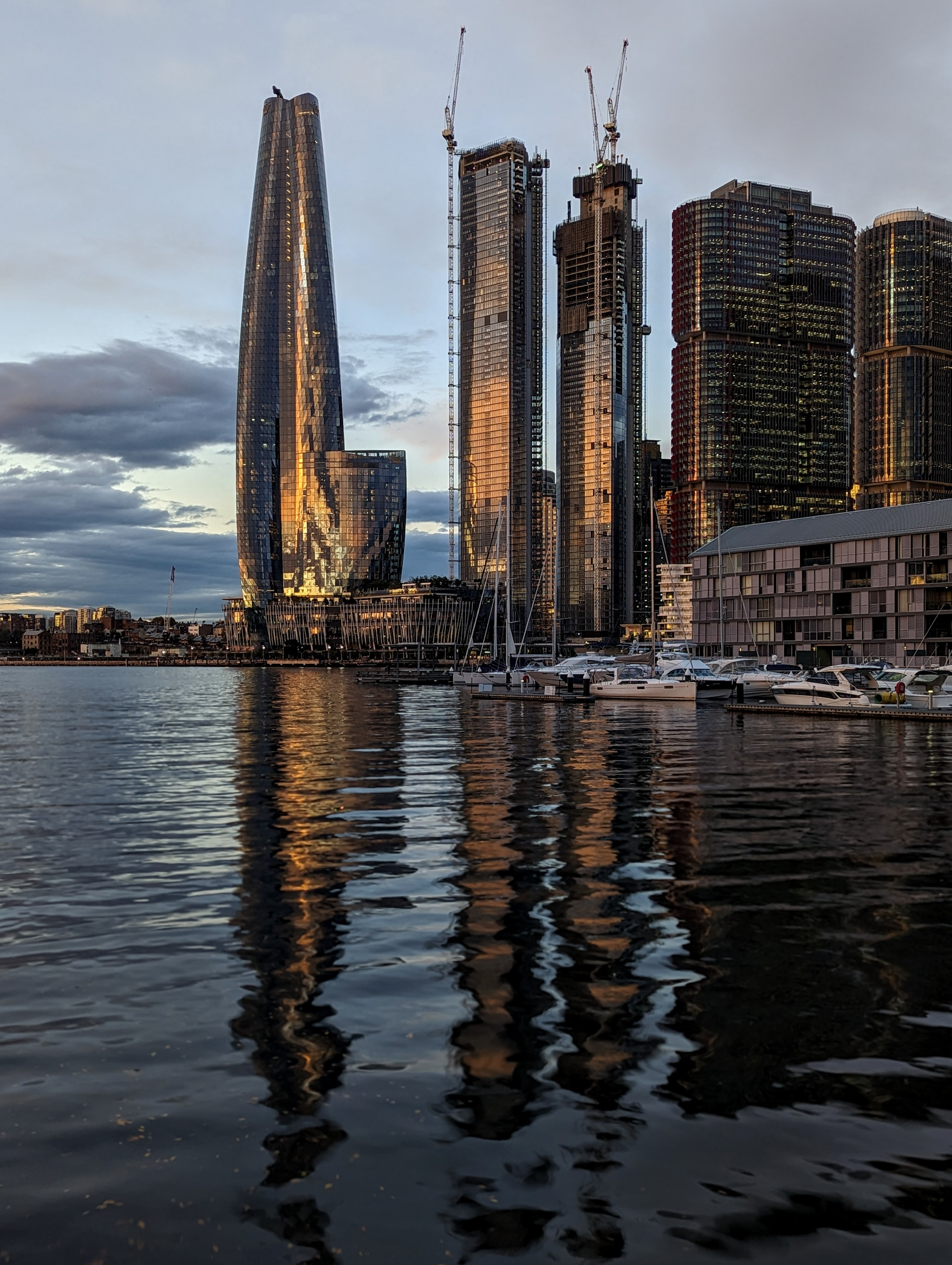
The Barangaroo skyline from Pyrmont, 2023

Barangaroo South is the southern third of the site and acts as an extension of Sydney's CBD, with office buildings, apartments, retail outlets, public spaces and a hotel. Three commercial skyscrapers designed by Rogers Stirk Harbour + Partners form the core of this stage; known as International Towers Sydney. The tallest is IT1 at 217 metres (712 ft). In addition to office space, it will also include a community or childcare centre. All three towers will feature retail on the podium levels. All 3 International Towers have been completed in 2025.

==== Barangaroo Central ====
Barangaroo Central will contain low-rise residential and commercial buildings. James Packer's casino group, Crown Limited, presented an A$1 billion+ proposal to Premier O'Farrell in February 2012 to build a hotel, casino and entertainment complex at the site on land that is set aside for open space at Barangaroo Central. The Premier initially welcomed the proposal, yet cautioned it would need to gain regulatory approval before going ahead. The proposal drew widespread criticism from the Lord Mayor, Clover Moore, former Prime Minister Paul Keating, and former government architect, Chris Johnson. In October 2012, Premier O'Farrell announced that the NSW Cabinet reviewed the proposal and decided that the government will enter into detailed negotiations with Crown Limited for the establishment of a casino and hotel complex at Barangaroo. Tony Harris, a former NSW Auditor General was critical of the decision−making process, claiming the public could miss out on millions of dollars. Businessman and former politician John Hewson, Greens MP John Kaye, and Clover Moore were also critical of the process. Defending his position, Packer opined:

With our harbour and climate, Sydney should be one of the world's best destinations, but we are being let down by an under-investment in quality tourism infrastructure... A world-class landmark resort on Sydney Harbour can be the catalyst to help turn the city around, just as Crown assisted in the turnaround of Melbourne... Some commentators have raised the process we are undertaking to progress our proposal. The NSW unsolicited proposal process exists to allow any organisation with unique ideas to make a submission to the government. We have followed that process to the letter and, despite reaching stage two, there is a long way to go... For a hotel resort in Sydney to be a landmark building that will attract millions of visitors, it must be on Sydney Harbour. Barangaroo is the only waterfront and harbourside location in the Sydney CBD that will accommodate such a development.

— James Packer in The Sydney Morning Herald, 3 November 2012

In July 2013 after a recommendation from an independent steering committee Premier O'Farrell announced the Crown proposal would be moved to Stage 3 of the unsolicited proposals process, the final stage where the parties will negotiate a binding contract. The government is to receive an A$100 million upfront fee for the licence, despite being offered A$250 million with alternative tax arrangements which the steering committee's economic advisor Deloitte calculated was a superior offer. Crown's intention is to lure Chinese high-rollers to its Sydney casino leveraging off its interests in its Macau casinos and taking advantage of a new streamlined visa process introduced by the Australian government for Chinese citizens wanting to gamble at Australian casinos. In November 2013, it was announced that Crown Sydney received approval for the casino licence and place at Barangaroo. Crown Sydney opened its resort hotel and restaurant/bars precinct in December 2020, though the casino is subject to future approval.

==== Barangaroo Reserve (Millers Point) ====
Barangaroo Reserve (Millers Point)
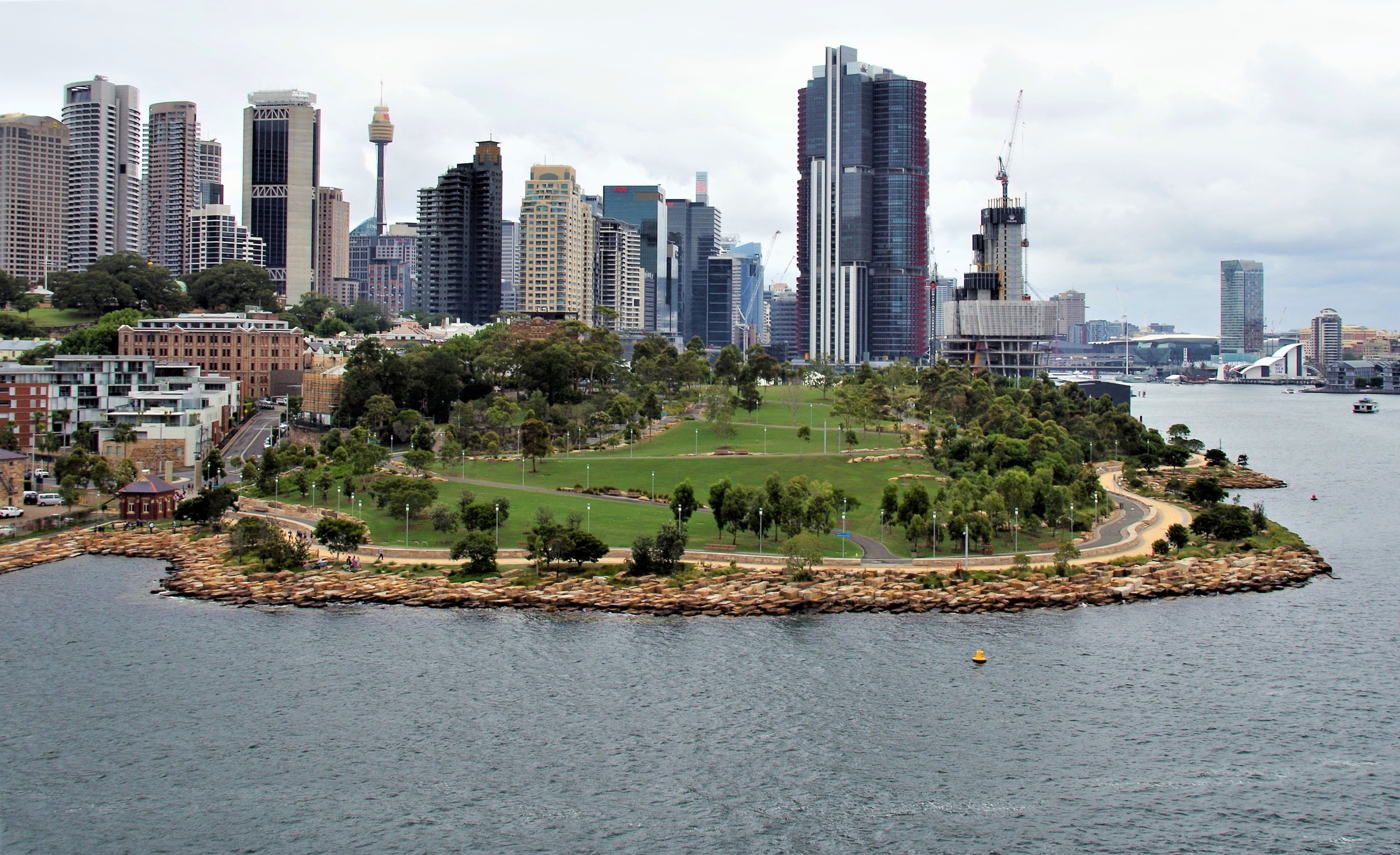
- Aerial view, March 2019
- Interactive map of Barangaroo Reserve (Millers Point)
- Type: Urban park
- Location: Barangaroo, Sydney, Australia
- Area: 6 hectares (15 acres)
- Created: 22 August 2015
- Designer: Johnson Pilton Walker, in association with PWP Landscape Architecture
- Operator: City of Sydney
- Status: Open all year

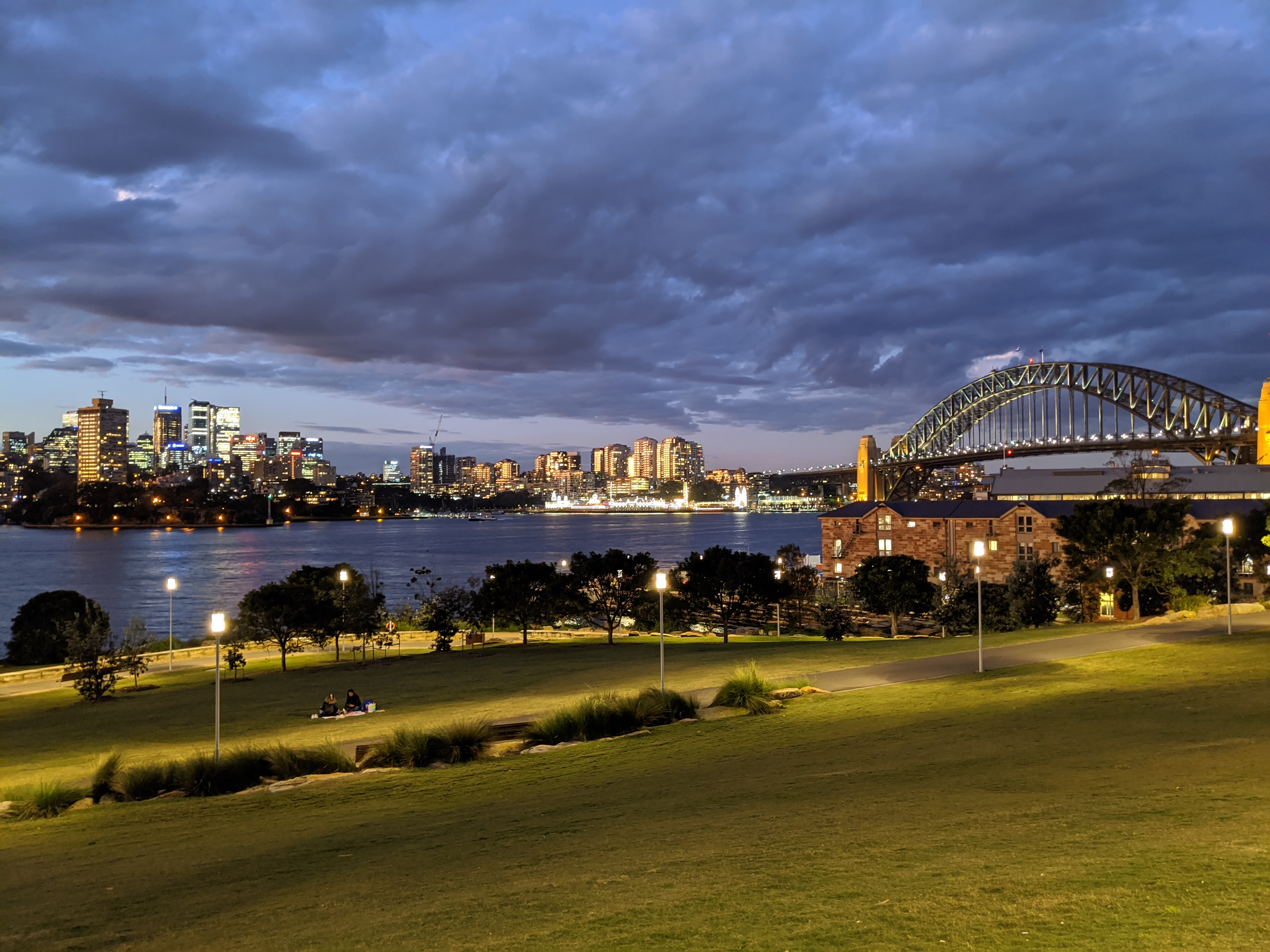
Walumil Lawns

Barangaroo Reserve is a 6-hectare (15-acre) artificially recreated headland park at the northern end of Barangaroo. The park opened on 22 August 2015 and features a reconstructed, naturalistic headland based around the pre-1836 shoreline. After 1836, the original headland and foreshore was cut away to make space for wharves and stevedoring activities as Sydney became a major international port. The new headland is inspired by what existed before 1836 and restores the relationship with other headlands in Sydney Harbour. A design competition held in 2009–2010 was won by Johnson Pilton Walker, in association with PWP Landscape Architecture. It was said the site was reconnecting Millers Point to the waterfront which re-establishes Sydney's first neighbourhood as one of contemporary and historic significance. The parkland features grassed areas, lookouts, walking and cycle paths, two new harbour coves, and tidal rock pools created from sandstone excavated directly from the Barangaroo site. However, the site itself is what was named Millers Point almost 200 years ago, and the Geographical Names Board upheld the Millers Point Community's objection to it being named Barangaroo Point. The parklands included the Sydney Harbour Control Tower, built in 1974. The design of Barangaroo Reserve called for removal of the tower as it did not assimilate with the "natural" architectural goal for the reserve, however this attracted some public outcry. Demolition of the tower began in March 2016 and reached completion in January 2017.

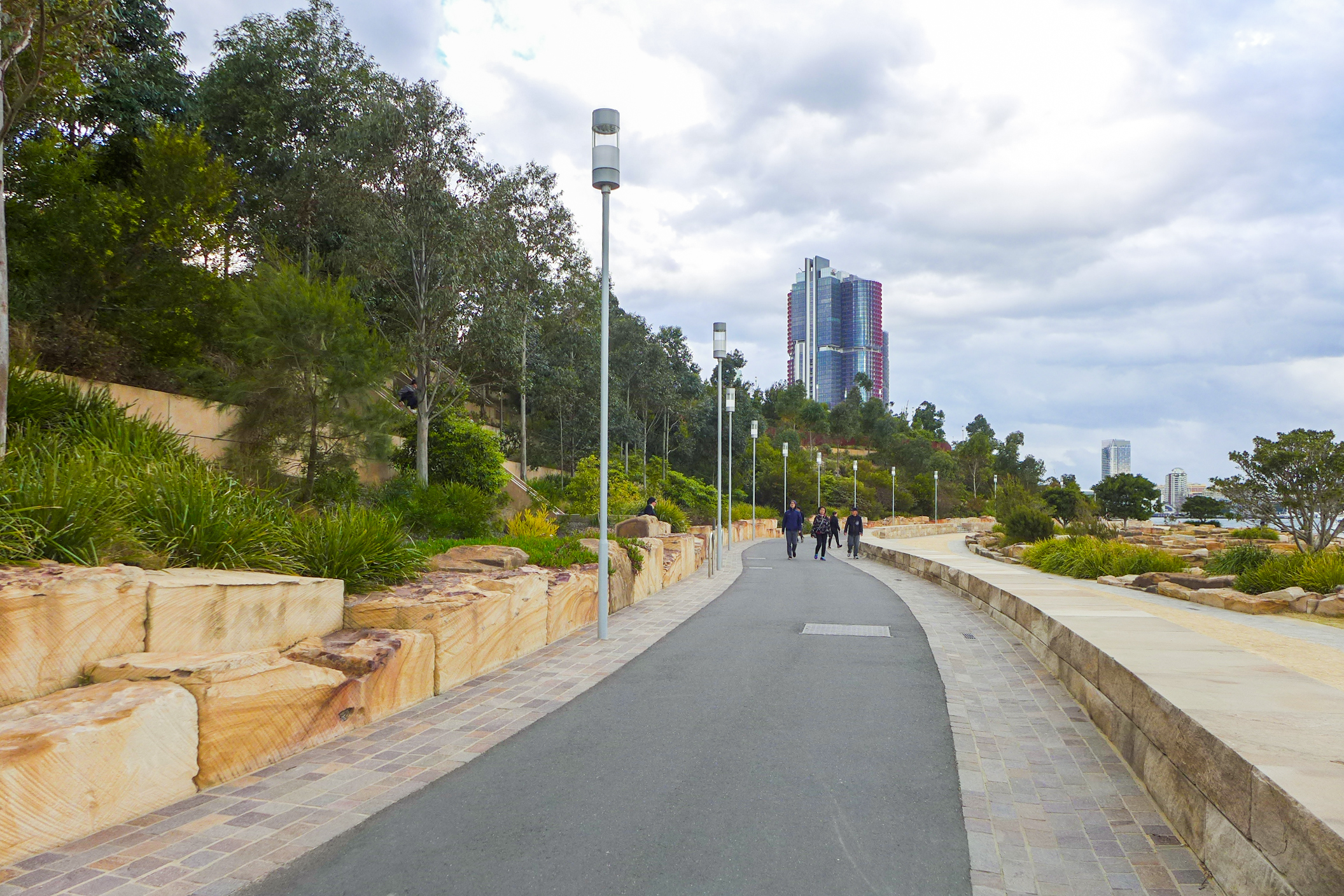
Wulugul Walk

The Hawkesbury sandstone used to create Barangaroo Reserve was excavated on site. The foreshore of the park is constructed from 10,000 sandstone blocks excavated and cut on the site. Some 6,500 blocks were placed to create the foreshore. More than 42,000 tonnes (46,297 short tons) of rough stone and a further 30,000 tonnes (33,069 short tons) of crushed stone was also used in the construction. In addition, some 75,000 native trees, plants and shrubs have been used to landscape Barangaroo Reserve.

A total of 84 species were chosen, 79 of which are native to Sydney Harbour. Many of the species are not to be found in commercial nurseries, so seeds and cuttings were collected from wild sites around Sydney Harbour and the Hawkesbury River.

A cultural facility called The Cutaway, and a car park is located beneath the headland.

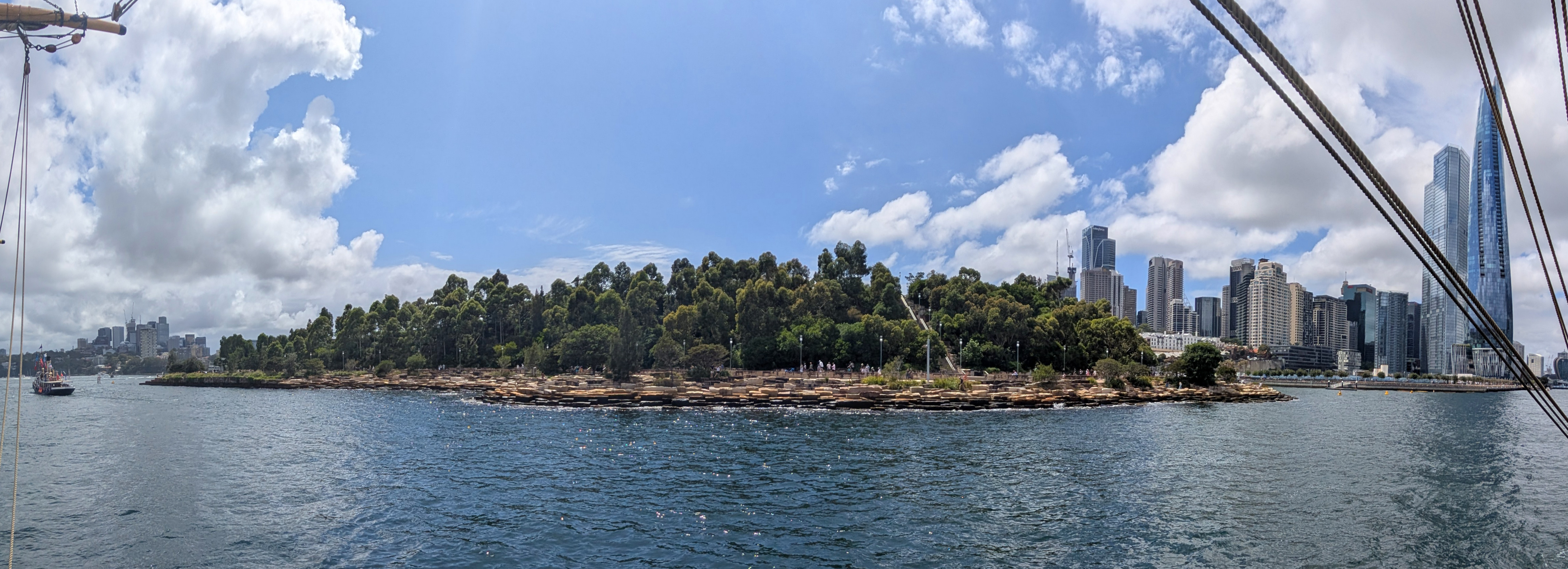
Panoramic view of Barangaroo Research from the SV James Craig on Sydney Harbour

== Population ==
According to 2016 census there were 189 people in Barangaroo. It was Sydney's most expensive area, with average apartments costing $10,000,000. At the 2021 census the population had grown to 220.

There has been criticism as the area was intended to be redeveloped for affordable housing, but now features Australia's most expensive and exclusive real estate.

== Transport ==
=== Ferry ===
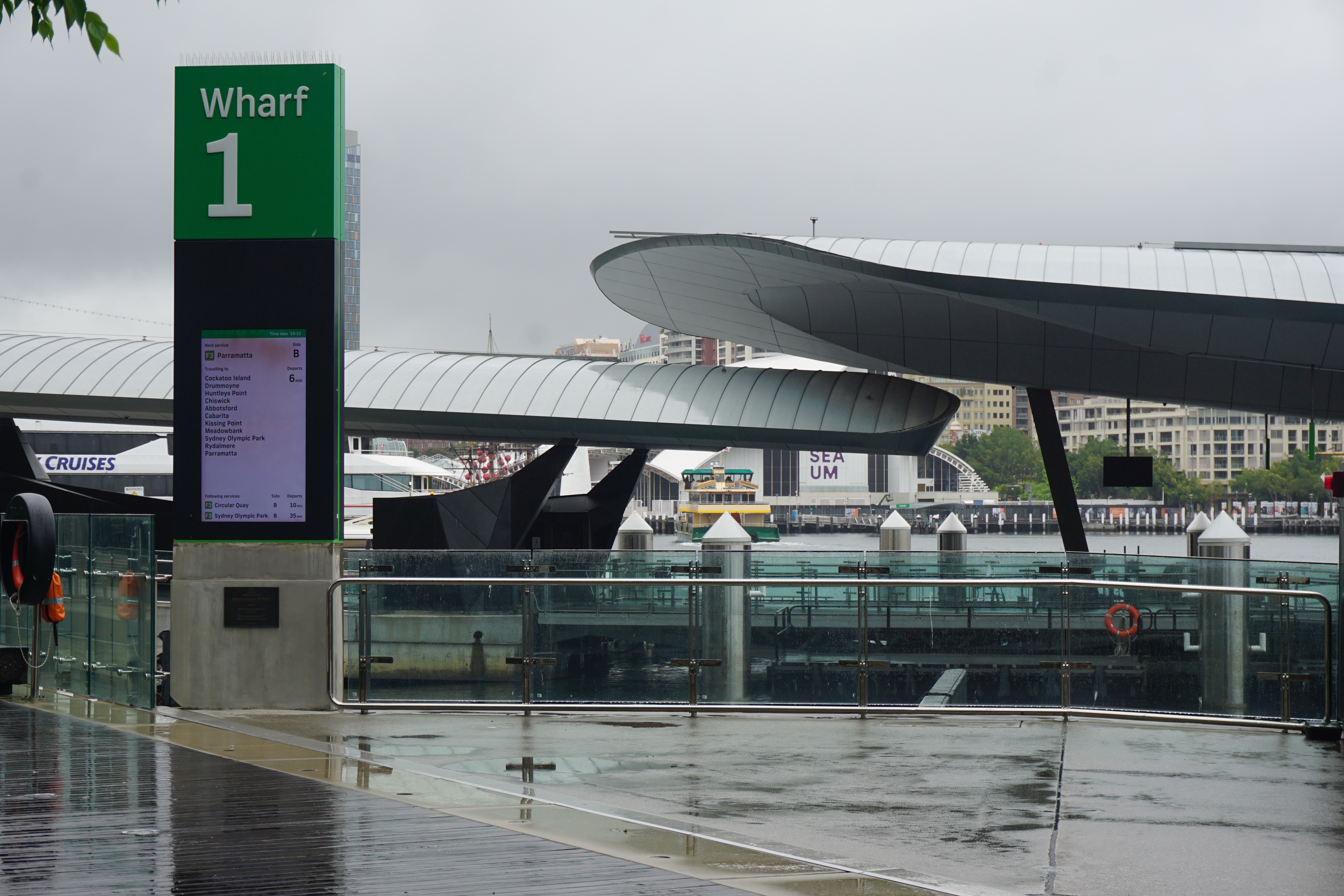
Barangaroo Wharf 1

Barangaroo ferry wharf replaced Darling Harbour ferry wharf in June 2017. The complex serves as the city centre's western ferry hub and consists of two wharves, with provision for a third wharf in the future. It is serviced by Sydney Ferries' F3 Parramatta River, F4 Pyrmont Bay, and F10 Blackwattle Bay services.

=== Metro ===
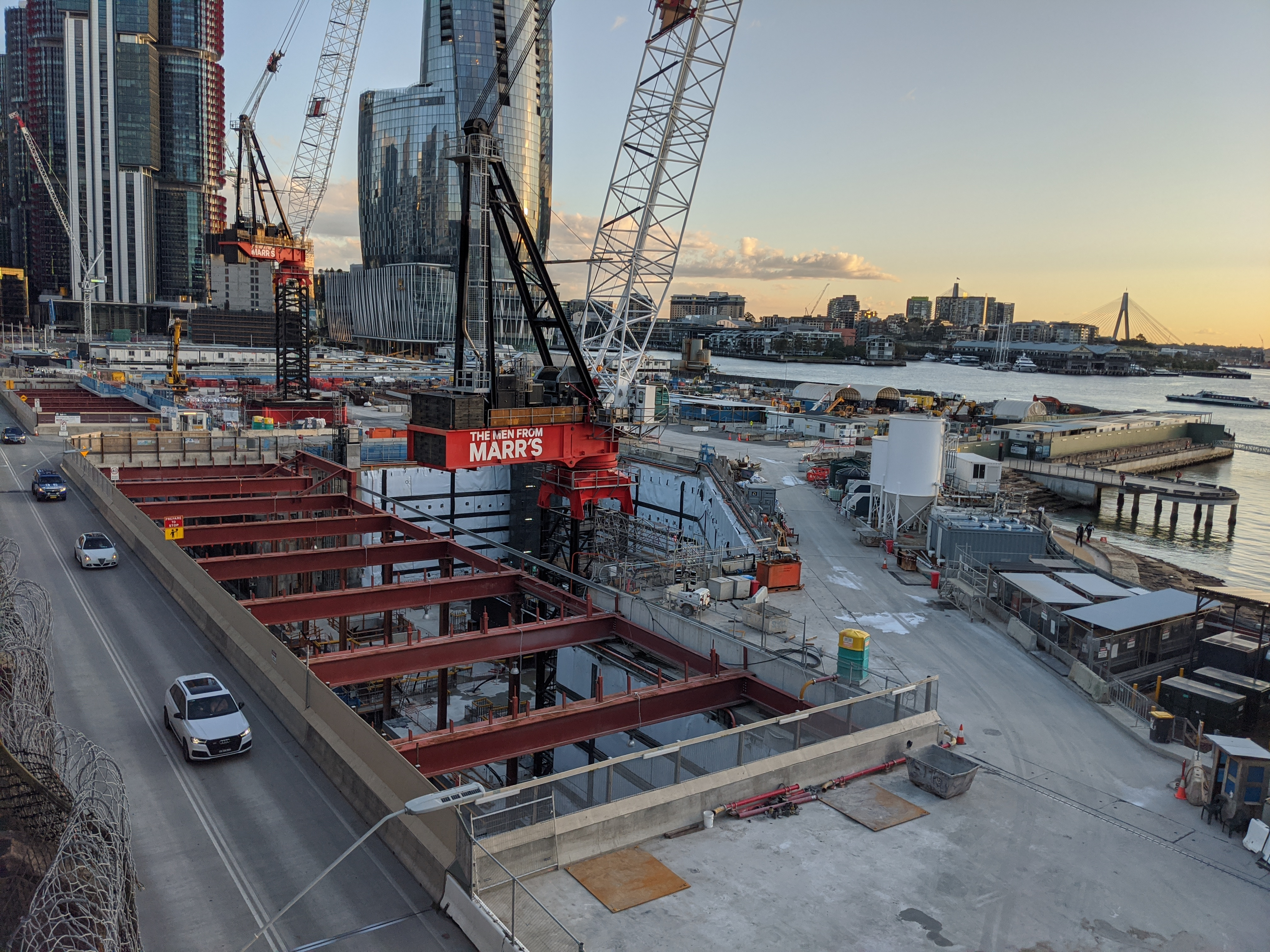
Barangaroo Metro Station under construction

Barangaroo railway station is a rapid transit station servicing Barangaroo. The railway station opened on 19th August 2024 as part of the Sydney Metro City & Southwest project. It is served by the Metro North West & Bankstown Line.

=== Bus ===
Barangaroo is served by Transdev John Holland bus routes 311, 324 and 325 to the Eastern Suburbs.

=== Wynyard Walk ===
Wynyard Walk, connecting Wynyard station with Barangaroo, opened in 2016.

== See also ==
- Millers Point

Two other large-scale inner-city urban renewal projects in Sydney are:

- Central Park, Sydney
- Green Square, New South Wales
