= The Cutaway =

Place in Barangaroo, Sydney, New South Wales, Australia

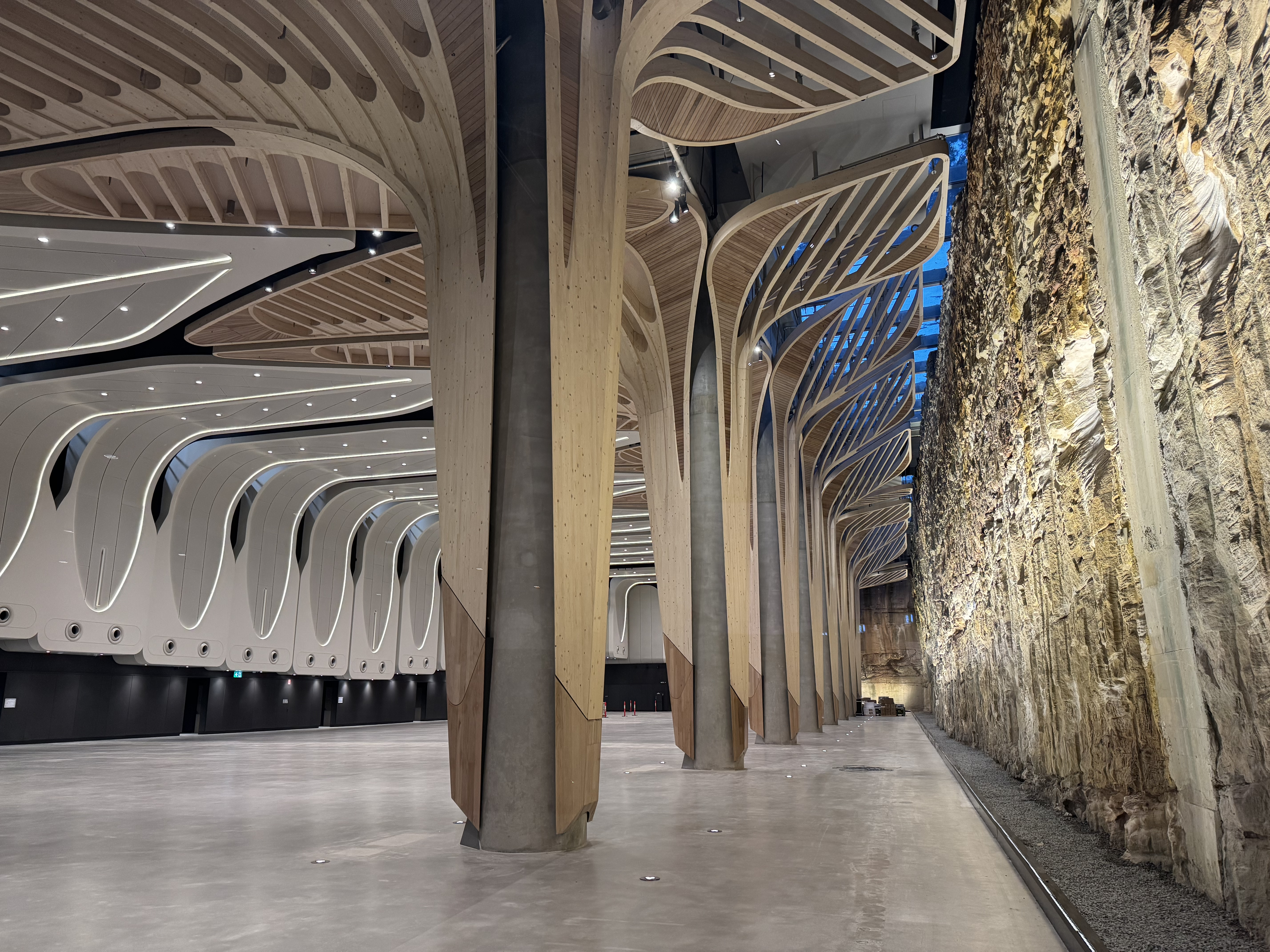
- The Cutaway in May 2026
- Address: Sydney; Australia
- Location: Barangaroo
- Owner: Placemaking NSW
- Operator: ICC Sydney (Note: This consortium consists of Darling Harbour Live, Placemaking NSW and ICC Sydney.)
- Capacity: 3,000
- Type: Arts, cultural and events space
- Field size: 120 metres long by 45 metres wide, a total of 10,000m^{2}
- Public transit: Barangaroo metro station Barangaroo ferry wharf

Construction
- Opened: May 2026
- Renovated: February 2024–April 2026
- Cost: $80 million
- Architects: fjcstudio, Shannon Foster and Jake Nash
- Project managers: Infrastructure NSW, FDC Construction & Fitout

Website
- The Cutaway project

The Cutaway is an entertainment precinct in Barangaroo, Sydney, New South Wales, Australia. The NSW Government describes it as an "arts, cultural and events space".

== History ==
The Cutaway was built in 2015 and hosted the 2022 Biennale of Sydney. Subsequently, it was primarily used to film car commercials because of its poor acoustics.

An Indigenous cultural centre named Buruk was proposed by the NSW Government from 2019 to 2022 to be installed in the Cutaway but the plan was countered by a separate plan from former prime minister Paul Keating which prompted the NSW Government to halt development of their plan. Keating's proposal involved modelling the Cutaway similar to the Musée d'Orsay former railway station and now museum in Paris.

In October 2025, the Cutaway's renovation was 85% complete.

The NSW Government announced that they would redesign the Cutaway in February 2024 and that FJC Studios would be commissioned to work on the design. The project was slated to cost $80 million and the government cited the need for better acoustics in the Cutaway.

In February 2026, planning minister Paul Scully dismissed the complaints of residents and allowed the venue to be operational 24 hours a day.

By 16 April, the cost of the project had risen to $100 million. It was also announced that the Cutaway would open to private bookings to host events from 1 August 2026.

The consortium that operates ICC Sydney was appointed to operate the Cutaway.

== Features ==
The Cutaway is built for all types of weather, has a capacity of 3,000 people, includes a commercial kitchen and is built to host events such as corporate events, gala dinners, markets and fashion shows. The Cutaway also has two mezzanine levels two gallery levels a First Nations education space for Indigenous art exhibitions, in addition to a green room and dressing rooms.

Richard Francis-Jones from fjcstudios said that the design for the Cutaway celebrates the natural environment rather than hiding it away. The Cutaway embraces Indigenous designs with spatial forms including rock shelters (Gunya) and the Port Jackson fig (Damun). Ceremonial markings on the floor are also visible as shadows when sun shines through the skylight. The Cutaway contains 13 timber trees up to 17 metres high that contain up to 115 individual pieces of timber, these trees have been designed to optimise acoustic performance and can weigh up to 950 kilograms. The Cutaway contains three skylights consisting of 98 custom panels that stretch for a total of 76 metres. Multiple levels are linked via a bronze spiral staircase.

The Cutaway has various features to improve acoustics such as two layers of glass separated by an air pocket to improve sound which is also intended to enhance natural light. The Cutaway will also be completely powered by renewable energy. The venue will use water from Sydney Harbour for cooling.
