= Mount Colah =

- Suburb
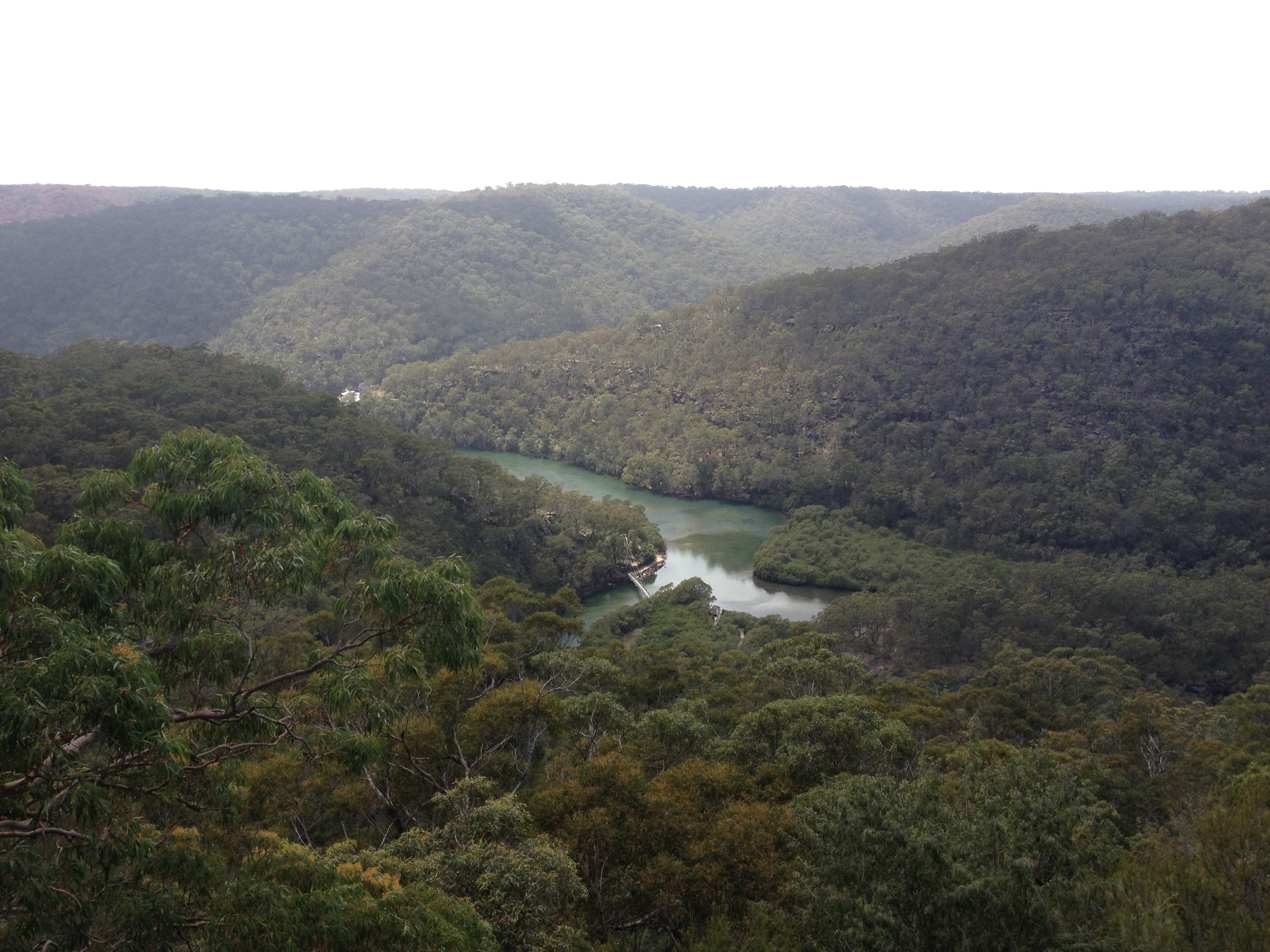
- View of Bobbin Head from the Kalkari Visitor Center

- Interactive map of Mount Colah
- Country: Australia
- State: New South Wales
- City: Sydney
- LGA: Hornsby Shire
- Location: 24 km (15 mi) north of Sydney CBD

Government
  - State electorate: Hornsby
  - Federal division: Berowra
- Elevation: 206 m (676 ft)

Population
  - Total: 7,816 (2021 census)
- Postcode: 2079
Suburbs around Mount Colah
| Hornsby Heights | Mount Ku-ring-gai | Mount Ku-ring-gai |
| Hornsby Heights | Mount Colah | Ku-ring-gai Chase National Park |
| Hornsby | Asquith | North Wahroonga |

Mount Colah is an outer suburb of Northern Sydney, in the state of New South Wales, Australia 24 kilometres north of the Sydney central business district, in the local government area of Hornsby Shire.

Mount Colah is 5 km north of Hornsby, the nearest major town centre. It is one of the most northerly suburbs of Sydney and is where the "Welcome to Sydney" sign is located. Mount Colah is the second highest suburb in Sydney by elevation. Considered one of Sydney's leafier suburbs, streets are clustered around the Pacific Highway. Mount Colah is bordered to the east by the Ku-ring-gai Chase National Park and to the west by Berowra Valley National Park.

Mount Colah varies in altitude from 68 m to about 206-217 m above sea level.

== History ==
Mount Colah was originally known as Colah - the name first used by naturalist George Caley to describe a koala in a letter to botanist Sir Joseph Banks. Colah Post Office opened on 29 September 1905 and was renamed Mount Colah in 1906, following the proclamation of Hornsby Shire in March of that year.

The Pacific Motorway (Sydney–Newcastle) was built through Mount Colah in 1988 and opened in March 1989. In the process it cut through an old World War II gravel airstrip, and isolated 2 holes of the Asquith Golf Course just to the south. Some World War II building remnants are still visible nearby.

Mount Colah was voted "Australia's Best Suburb" through an online poll conducted by Ninemsn in 2010.

== Population ==
In the 2021 Census, there were 7,816 people in Mount Colah. 65.7% of people were born in Australia. The next most common countries of birth were England 4.1%, India 3.7%, China 3.2%, Philippines 2.0% and Iran 1.9%. 72.5% of people spoke only English at home. Other languages spoken at home included Mandarin 3.9%, Persian (excluding Dari) 2.3%, Hindi 1.4%, Cantonese 1.3% and Spanish 1.1%. The most common responses for religion were No Religion 40.1%, Catholic 20.9% and Anglican 12.6%.

== Transport ==
The Pacific Highway and Ku-ring-gai Chase Road / Bobbin Head Road are the main arterial roads in Mount Colah. The M1 Motorway (known previously as the Sydney-Newcastle Freeway) runs along the eastern side of the suburb. The M1 has an entrance / exit at Mount Colah towards Sydney.

Mount Colah railway station is on the Main North railway line and a regular bus service runs to most parts of the suburb.

The suburb of Mount Colah embraces Bobbin Head commercial area, which has cafes, tourist information and a marina, with a large boat ramp in Appletree Bay. Access to Bobbin Head is by road from Ku-ring-gai Chase Road and by boat. There is also road access to Bobbin Head from North Turramurra.

== Commercial area ==
A small group of shops is located on the Pacific Highway. The group includes a variety of small retailers, restaurants and food stores, as well as a truck stop that has been servicing locals and truck drivers detouring from the F3 since the 1950s, plus a doctor's clinic, dental clinic, newsagent and a pharmacy that combines postal services. To the east of the railway station lies a community centre and primary school.

== School ==
Mount Colah Public School is on the eastern side of the railway line. The school was built in 1953, and replaced an asparagus farm. It is a primary school, catering for K-6 students. The school hall acts as the suburb's polling place for voting in local, state and federal elections. The closest zoned high schools for the suburb are nearby Hornsby High School (formerly Asquith Boys High School) and Asquith High School (formerly Asquith Girls High School).

== Residential areas ==
Street names in the most northern part of Mount Colah are associated with the Arthurian Legend such as: Sprigg Place, Arthurs Circle, Merlin Close, Excelsior Road, Round Table Close, Excalibur Close, Gareth Close, Galahad Close, Lancelot Street and Camelot Close. All of these streets either branch off from, or are accessed via, Excelsior Road, which itself follows a ridgeline.

Nearby the streets are named for flora, such as Foxglove Road, which was named for the flowers that were once grown in the area. Other similar street names there include Red Cedar Drive, Acorn Place and Chestnut Road. Foxglove Oval replaced a small land fill area, and caters to various track and field sports as well as other competitive community level sports.

The next closest name theme is explorer based. For example, a few are Hume Place, Flinders Place, Bass Place, Burke Place and Eyre Place.

On the east side of Mount Colah the streets running east to west bear names of adjoining suburbs: Colah Road, Cowan Road, Berowra Road, Kuring-gai Chase Road. Running north to south they follow a botanical theme, Neridah Avenue, Telopea Street and Myall Avenue are all Australian botanical species names.

On the south side of Mount Colah the streets are Jersey Street, Willarong Road, Lady Street, Yirra Road.

== Sports ==
- Mount Colah has three playing fields where most organised sports are played these being Berry Park, Foxglove Oval and Parklands Oval.
- Mount Colah Soccer Club was founded in 1958 and has over 500 soccer players playing in the Ku-ring-gai and District Soccer Association (KDSA).
- Mount Colah Cricket Club known as The Mustangs are the local cricket team with cricket pitches at all the three playing fields.
- Athletics is played at Foxglove Oval with it being the base for the Northern Districts Little Athletics during the summer.
- Cycling is a popular activity with Mount Colah being on a popular cycling route which includes Ku-ring-gai Chase Road and cycle lanes on the Pacific Highway. The Bush to Bridge is a commuter club which cycles from Mount Colah to the city.
- Golf is played at the Asquith Golf Course which is entered through Lord Street, Mount Colah.
