= Foxglove Oval =

Sports ground in Sydney, Australia

Coordinates: 33°39′31″S 151°07′23″E

Foxglove Oval is a park mostly commonly used for sporting events located on Foxglove Road in Mount Colah, Sydney, New South Wales, Australia.

The Hornsby District Cricket Club uses the sporting grounds at Foxglove Oval along with Northern Districts Little Athletics Centre and Asquith Boys' Cricket Home Ground. It is also used for sport carnivals. The ground has a large canteen, a large carpark and a playground.

For athletics, the grass surface is marked up with a full-size, 10-laned, 400-metre circular running track with a separate internal 12-laned, 110-metre straight track for sprints and hurdle races. Long and triple jump events can be conducted on two north–south synthetic runways (relaid in 2018) into sand pits located along the southern part of the western boundary. There are also three shot put circles and three discus circles with cages along the northern part of the western boundary.

The "wasteland" pitch has hosted many soccer games involving youth from the local area, and is frequented by residents returning home from late night activities in Sydney city.

The ground is commonly known for being the largest remediated landfill in Hornsby Shire.
