= Andrew Sayers =

Australian curator and museum director

Andrew Sayers AM
- Born: Andrew George Sayers; 29 June 1957; London, England, UK
- Died: 11 October 2015 (aged 58); Melbourne, Australia
- Education: Asquith Boys High School
- Alma mater: University of Sydney
- Occupations: Curator and museum director
- Organization: National Portrait Gallery (Australia)
- Spouse: Perrohean Sperling PSM
- Children: Three

Andrew George Sayers AM (29 June 1957 – 11 October 2015) was an Australian curator and painter. He was the first director of Australia's National Portrait Gallery from 1998 to 2010, and director of the National Museum of Australia from 2010 to 2013.

== Early life and education ==
Andrew George Sayers was born in London, England, on 29 June 1957. He emigrated to Australia at the age of seven, arriving in Sydney with his family in 1964.

He grew up in Mount Kuring-gai, and attended Asquith Boys High School, in Asquith, an upper north shore suburb of Sydney, from 1970 to 1975.

He studied fine arts at the University of Sydney graduating with an honours degree in 1978 or 1979, and for a while considered becoming an academic.

== Career ==
After university, he worked "in the back rooms" at the Art Gallery of New South Wales, as Registrar of Collections. From 1981 until 1985, he was assistant director at the Newcastle Region Art Gallery, in Newcastle, New South Wales.

In 1985 he moved to Canberra to work as curator of Australian drawings for the National Gallery of Australia, later becoming assistant director of collections.

In 1998, he was appointed as the inaugural director of the new National Portrait Gallery (NPGA) - then occupying a few rooms in the old Parliament House, and with just six members of staff. In 1999, his exhibition The Possibilities of Portraiture which included both historical and contemporary works in a number of different media, illustrated his vision for the future of the NPG. However, he was also committed to developing of the gallery "as a centre for biography and history". During his tenure, he created policies, made press appearances, commissioned artworks, and wrote proposals to acquire individual works. He also undertook research and wrote text for gallery displays. Other exhibitions conceived by him or created in partnership with him during his tenure, include:

- Arthur Boyd Portraits (1999-2000)
- Heads of the People (2000)
- Nolan Heads (2001)
- Intimate Portraits (2002)
- Contemporary Australian Portraits (2002-2003)
- POL: Portrait of a generation (2003)
- To Look Within: Self-portraits in Australia (2004)
- The World of Thea Proctor (2005)
- Clifton Pugh Australians (2005-2006)
- Open Air: Portraits in the landscape (2008)

In 2010, he was appointed as director of the National Museum of Australia; however, he left the role in 2013, three years into a five-year contract, to move to Melbourne, where his wife Perry was working for the Victoria State Government.

== Painting ==
Sayers is known for his painted portraits. In Melbourne, he resumed his love of painting, producing several portraits in his Richmond studio which he entered in competitions.

In May/June 2015, an exhibition of his work featuring landscapes painted around the Victorian coast, called Nature Through the Glass of Time, was exhibited at Lauraine Diggins Fine Art in Melbourne.

== Recognition and honours ==
- 1994: HE Stanner Award of the Australian Institute of Aboriginal and Torres Strait Islander Studies, for his book Aboriginal Artists of the 19th Century
- 2001: Centenary Medal, for service to society and the arts
- 2010: Member of the Order of Australia, for service to arts administration, particularly as the director of the National Portrait Gallery, and to the promotion of Australian portraiture
- 2011: State finalist for Australian of the Year
- 2014: Self-portrait, finalist in the Doug Moran National Portrait Prize
- 2015: Portrait of Tim Bonyhady, finalist in the 2015 Archibald Prize

== Later life, death and legacy ==
After retiring in 2013, Sayers painted full-time.

In May 2014, Sayers was diagnosed with pancreatic cancer, which he called "the background static of [his] life". He died on 11 October 2015, aged 58.

In November 2015, an exhibition of his new work was mounted at Beaver Galleries in Canberra.

His curatorship at the National Gallery "led to significant redefinitions of Australian art", and his ideas and decisions shaped the future of the National Portrait Gallery, which was in its infancy when he assumed control. The Australian Academy of the Humanities wrote that thanks to Sayers, Wally Caruana, Howard Morphy, and other experts, "Australian art history has been rewritten", with his 2001 book Australian Art covering both Aboriginal and European art.

In 2018, the inaugural Andrew Sayers Memorial Lecture was held at the NPG, given by artist Tim Bonyhady, the subject of Sayers' 2015 entry for the Archibald Prize. The series is continuing.

== Personal life ==
Sayers was married to Perry, and they had three daughters.

He ran 15 marathons between 2005 and 2014.

== Publications ==
- Drawing in Australia (1989)
- Aboriginal Artists of the 19th Century (1994)
- Australian Art (2001; Oxford History of Art series)

== Exhibitions ==
- The Capital and Beyond: The Landscapes of Andrew Sayers (Sept - Oct 2026). Presented by OFFMARKET Gallery as part of Canberra Art Biennial, ACT
- Ovals & Fields (Sept 2025). Presented by OFFMARKET Gallery at Lawson Flats, Perth Western Australia
- Bridges of Light: The Art of Andrew Sayers (Feb 2025). OFFMARKET Gallery, Claremont, Western Australia
