= National Portrait Gallery (Australia) =

Public art gallery in Canberra, Australia

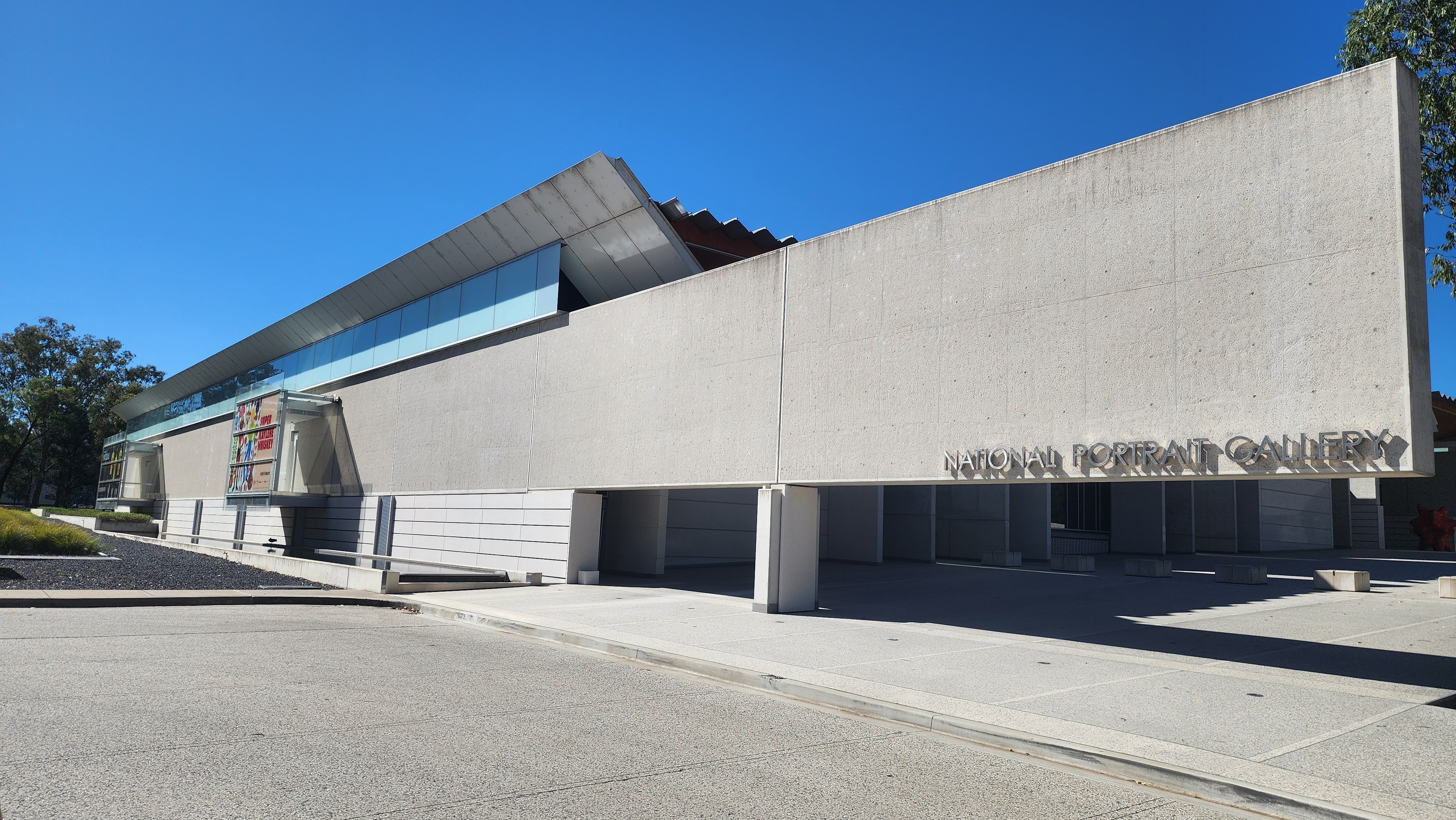
- National Portrait Gallery building

- Location in the Australian Capital Territory National Portrait Gallery (Australia) (Australia)
- Former name: National Library of Australia, Old Parliament House
- Established: May 1998; 28 years ago
- Location: King Edward Terrace, Parkes, Canberra, Australian Capital Territory
- Coordinates: 35.3°S 149.133889°E
- Type: Portrait gallery
- Architect: Johnson Pilton Walker
- Employees: 48.8
- Public transit access: Action buses
- Website: portrait.gov.au

The National Portrait Gallery, also known as the National Portrait Gallery of Australia (NGA or NPGA) in Canberra is a public art gallery containing portraits of prominent Australians. It was established in 1998 and moved to its present building on King Edward Terrace in December 2008.

== History ==
In the early 1900s, the painter Tom Roberts was the first to propose that Australia should have a national portrait gallery, but it was not until the 1990s that the possibility began to take shape.

The 1992 exhibition Uncommon Australians – developed by the gallery's founding patrons, Gordon and Marilyn Darling – was shown in Canberra and toured to four state galleries, igniting the idea of a national portrait gallery. In 1994, under the management of the National Library of Australia, the gallery's first exhibition was launched in Old Parliament House. It was a further four years before the appointment of Andrew Sayers as inaugural director signalled the establishment of the National Portrait Gallery as an institution in its own right, with a board, a budget and a brief to develop its own collection.

The collection was established in May 1998, and the inaugural director, Andrew Sayers, appointed. At that time it was housed in a few rooms in Old Parliament House and in a nearby gallery on Commonwealth Place. The opening of displays in the refurbished Parliamentary Library and two adjacent wings of Old Parliament House in 1999 endorsed the gallery's status and arrival as an independent institution.

While the spaces of Old Parliament House proved adaptable to the National Portrait Gallery's programs, its growing profile and collection necessitated the move to a dedicated building. Funding for the A$87 million building was provided in the 2005 federal budget and Sydney-based architectural firm Johnson Pilton Walker was awarded the job of creating the gallery, with construction commencing in December 2006. The new National Portrait Gallery opened to the public on 4 December 2008 on King Edward Terrace, beside the High Court of Australia, by prime minister Kevin Rudd.

== The permanent collection ==
The portrait gallery contains portraits of prominent Australians (by birth or association) who are important in their field of endeavour, or whose life sets them apart as an individual of long-term public interest.

In 2020, the National Portrait Gallery’s permanent collection stands at approximately 3000 portraits across a range of mediums – including photography, painting, drawing, multimedia, sculpture and textiles – and continues to grow through an acquisition and commissioning program tied to a judiciously applied collection criteria.

== Prizes ==
There are two exhibitions presented as the gallery's "National Portrait Prizes".

=== National Photographic Portrait Prize ===
The gallery’s National Photographic Portrait Prize (NPPP) is an annual award for Australian photographers, as of 2022 worth A$30,000.

=== Darling Portrait Prize ===
In March 2020 the inaugural Darling Portrait Prize for painted portraits, featuring a A$75,000 winner's prize, was established in honour of L. Gordon Darling AC CMG (1921-2015), who was a key founder of the National Portrait Gallery. This is a biennial prize.

Winners

- 2020: Anthea da Silva, for her portrait of dancer and choreographer Elizabeth Cameron Dalman
- 2022: Jaq Grantford, for her self-portrait
- 2024: Noel McKenna, for William Nuttal with horses in the field

== The building ==
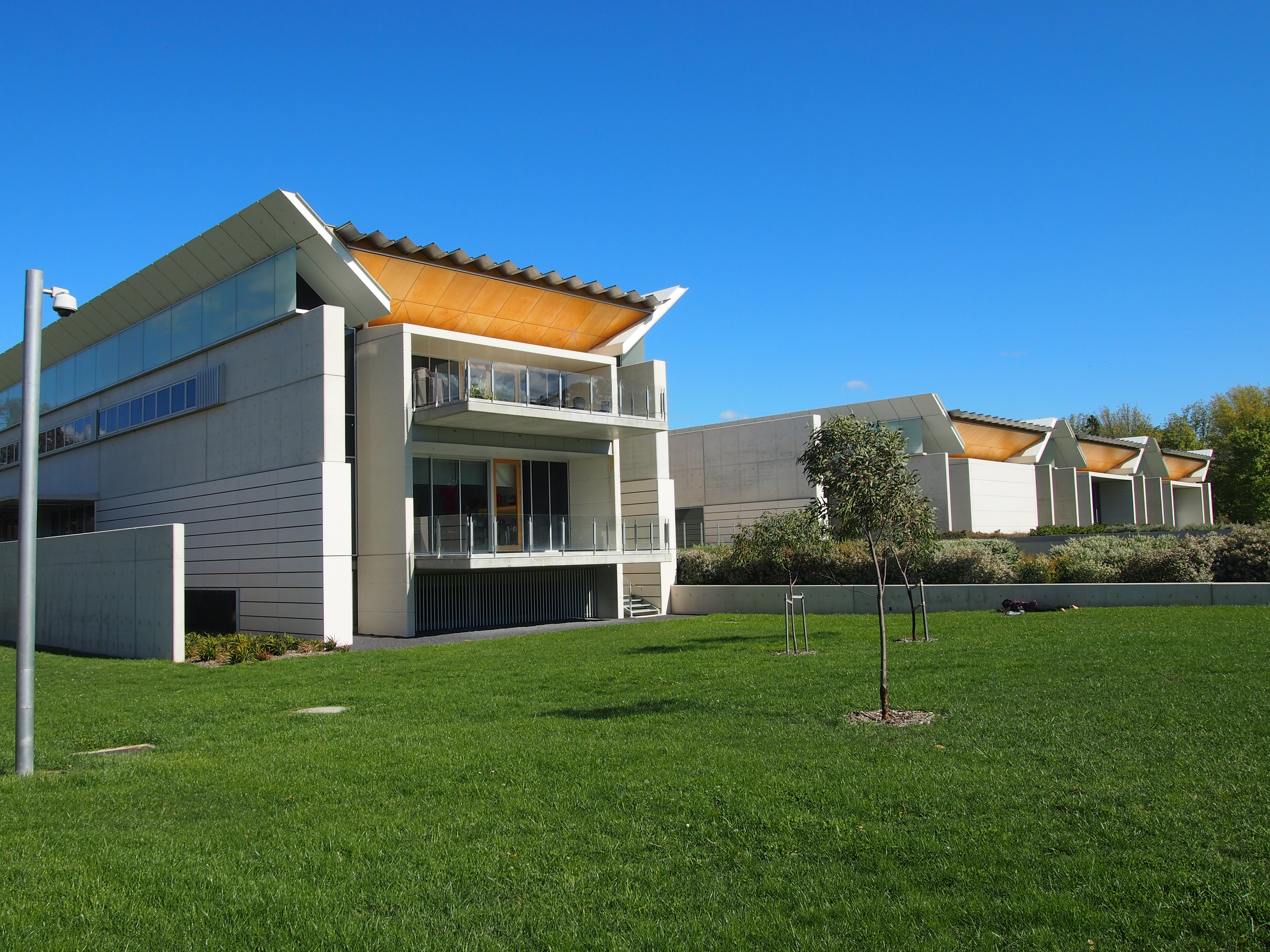
The western face of the National Portrait Gallery building

Won through an open international design competition by Johnson Pilton Walker in 2005, the 14,000 square metres (150,000 sq ft) building provides exhibition space for approximately 500 portraits in a simple configuration of day-lit galleries.

The external form of the building responds to its site by using the building's geometry to connect with key vistas and alignments around the precinct. A series of five bays, each more than 70 metres (230 ft) long, are arranged perpendicular to the Land Axis referring to Walter Burley Griffin’s early concepts for Canberra. It was built by John Holland.

North face of the National Portrait Gallery building

The National Portrait Gallery features a sequence of spaces leading from the Entrance Court defined by the two large cantilever concrete blades on the eastern side of the building, through the foyer to the fantastic gallery spaces. Each gallery receives controlled natural light from translucent glazed clerestory windows and views to the outside.

In April 2019, the gallery was closed for several months for rectification work to maintain the integrity of its building. The gallery reopened in September 2019.

== Governance ==
The National Portrait Gallery of Australia (NGPA), usually referred to simply as the National Portrait Gallery (NGA), is an Australian Government agency, governed by the Board of the National Portrait Gallery of Australia (NGPA). As of December 2022 the board is chaired by Penny Fowler.

=== Directors ===
Andrew Sayers was inaugural director, appointed in May 1998.

Angus Trumble was director for a five-year term from around 2014 until the end of 2018.

Karen Quinlan AM was appointed director with effect from December 2018. She was formerly director of Bendigo Art Gallery for 18 years, and curator for three years before that. At the time of her appointment she was also Professor of Practice at the La Trobe Art Institute at Bendigo. Quinlan was made a Member of the Order of Australia in the 2019 Australia Day Honours list, "for her significant service to the visual arts and to higher education." In August 2022 Quinlan was appointed chief executive of Arts Centre Melbourne, with the new role starting on 3 October 2022.

Trent Birkett took over as acting director in October 2022, until Bree Pickering began a five-year appointment in April 2023.

== Events ==
=== Andrew Sayers Memorial Lecture ===
The Andrew Sayers Memorial Lecture is held annually, in honour of the inaugural curator of the NPGA Andrew Sayers. The inaugural lecture was given by artist Tim Bonyhady, the subject of Sayers' 2015 entry for the Archibald Prize.

In 2019, the lecture was given by gallery director Karen Quinlan.

On 27 April 2023 Stephen Page, former artistic director of Bangarra Dance Theatre, delivered his lecture titled "Clanship". He talked about cultural connections relating to family, Aboriginal kinship, Aboriginal identity, and relationships with the wider world, including Native American Indians and Canadian First Nations peoples. The lecture was streamed live.

On 31 July 2024, writer, broadcaster, and cultural commentator Benjamin Law looked at contemporary portraiture and the press in his lecture.
