= Leroy Houston =

- Born: Leroy Houston; 10 November 1986 (age 40) Levin, New Zealand
- Height: 191 cm (6 ft 3 in)
- Weight: 117 kg (18 st 6 lb)
- School: Asquith Boys High School

Rugby union career
- Position: Number Eight
Youth career
- Beecroft
Senior career
| Years | Team | Apps | (Points) |
| 2007 | Ballymore Tornadoes | 7 | (5) |
| 2011–12 | Bordeaux | 19 | (0) |
| 2012–13 | Colomiers | 18 | (5) |
| 2013–16 | Bath Rugby | 91 | (70) |
| 2017-19 | Bordeaux | 33 | (15) |
| 2019- | Biarritz Olympique | 4 | (0) |
- Correct as of 26 December 2019 @ 15:09:51 PM (AEST)
Super Rugby
| Years | Team | Apps | (Points) |
| 2005–06 | New South Wales | | |
| 2008–11 | Queensland Reds | 48 | (10) |
| 2016–pres. | Queensland Reds | | |
International career
| Years | Team | Apps | (Points) |
| 2010 | Australia A | | |
| 2016–pres. | Australia | 1 | (0) |
- Correct as of 8 October 2016

Leroy Houston (born 10 November 1986) is an Australian professional rugby union player. He currently plays for Biarritz Olympique in the Rugby Pro D2. He played for the Queensland Reds in Super Rugby and previously played in France, in the Pro D2 for US Colomiers, before playing for Bath Rugby in the Aviva Premiership.

== Early life ==
Houston was born in Levin, New Zealand and spent his early years in Shannon before moving to Australia with his family in 2000. Houston was educated at Asquith Boys High School in Sydney.

== Career ==
Houston originally played for the New South Wales Waratahs from 2005 where he was picked to tour with the Wallabies, he also played for Australia A before playing a Super 14 game.

Houston took time off from rugby in 2007 to play rugby league for the Asquith Magpies in the Jim Beam Cup and eventually decided to sign with the Queensland Reds for the 2008 Super 14 season, receiving the Rookie of the Year Award. Houston made his debut for Queensland in a pre-season trial against his old club the Waratahs.

In February 2013, it was announced that Houston would join English Premiership side Bath Rugby from US Colomiers for the 2013/14 season.

Houston left Bath to re-join Queensland Reds in the Summer of 2016 with hopes of furthering his international career. Following the end of the Reds season Houston resigned for Bath on a short-term deal. Houston scored the final try in his first match back for Bath, a 37–22 victory over Worcester Warriors.

=== International ===
In 2016, Houston was named in the Wallabies preliminary 39-man squad for the 2016 series against England after it was announced that he would be returning to the Queensland Reds, but he had to wait another four months until October that year to make his test debut, coming off the bench to replace Lopeti Timani against Argentina in London for the final match of the 2016 Rugby Championship.
