= Mount Colah railway station =

Railway station in Sydney, New South Wales, Australia

Mount Colah
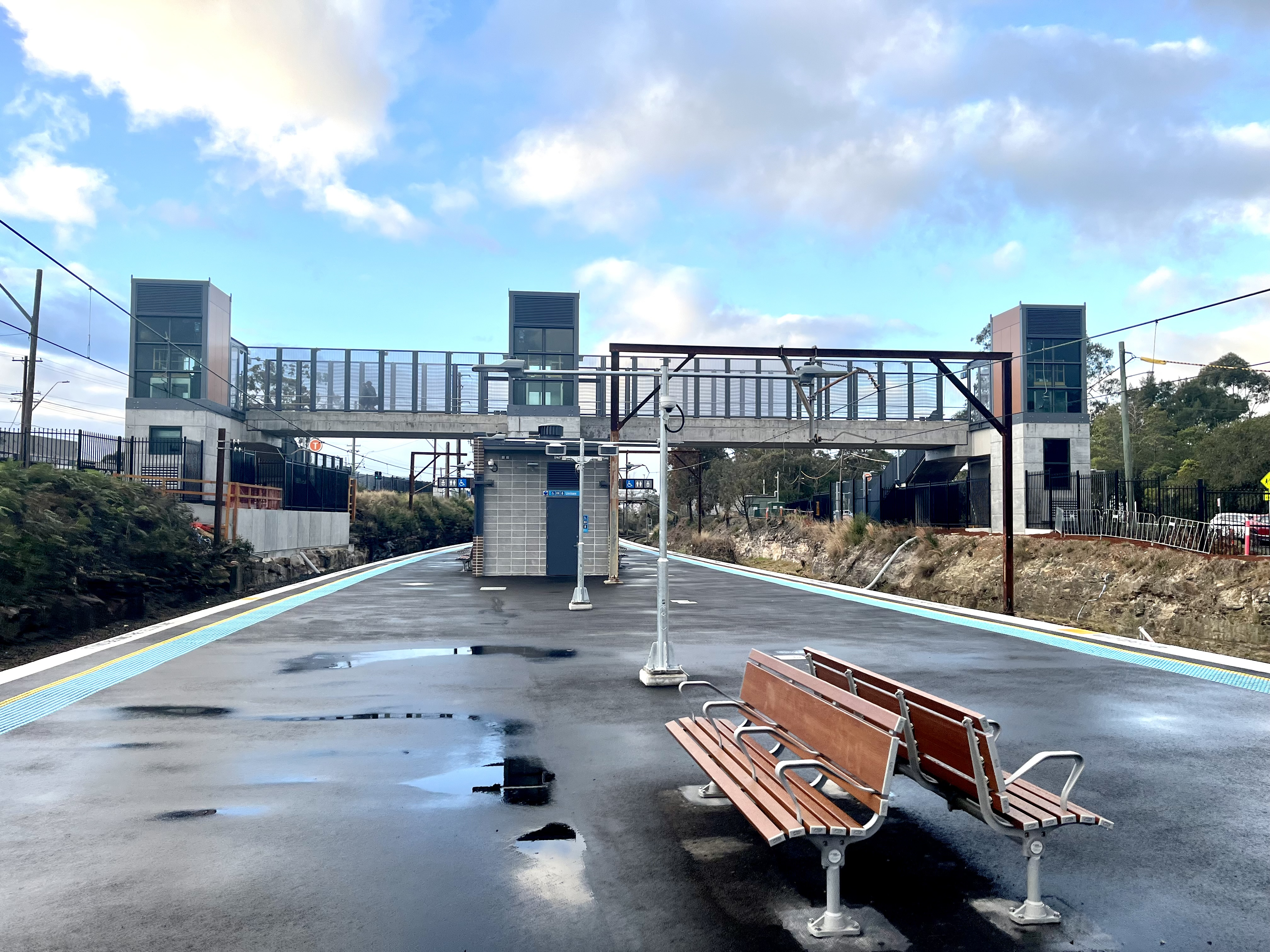
- Northbound view of the Footbridge in August 2024

General information
- Location: Pacific Highway, Mount Colah, New South Wales; Australia
- Coordinates: 33°40′19″S 151°06′52″E
- Elevation: 205 m (673 ft)
- Owner: Transport Asset Manager of New South Wales
- Operator: Sydney Trains
- Line: Main North
- Distance: 37.68 km (23.41 mi) from Central
- Platforms: 2 (1 island)
- Tracks: 2
- Connections: Bus

Construction
- Structure type: Ground
- Accessible: Yes

Other information
- Status: Weekdays: Staffed: 6am to 2pm: Weekends and public holidays: Unstaffed
- Station code: MOC
- Website: Transport for NSW

History
- Opened: 1 July 1887 (139 years ago)
- Electrified: Yes (January 1960)
- Former names: Colah (1887–1906)

Passengers
- 2025: 301,828 (year); 827 (daily) (Sydney Trains)
- Rank: 178

Services
Preceding station	Sydney Trains	Following station
Mount Kuring-gai towards Berowra	North Shore & Western Line	Asquith via Gordon towards City
Preceding station	Intercity Trains	Following station
Mount Kuring-gai towards Newcastle Interchange	Central Coast & Newcastle Line Weekend limited services	Asquith towards Central
Location

Mount Colah railway station is a suburban railway station located on the Main North line, serving the Sydney suburb of Mount Colah. It is served by Sydney Trains T1 North Shore Line services and some early morning and late night intercity Central Coast & Newcastle Line services.

== History ==
Mount Colah station opened on 1 July 1887 as Colah. It was renamed Mount Colah on 6 May 1906.

The station received a new concrete footbridge with three lifts, tactile indicators, a new station building and an accessible bathroom as part of an upgrade to replace the former footbridge at the northern end of the station, in August 2024.

== Services ==
=== Platforms ===
Platform	Line	Stopping pattern	Notes
1	North Shore & Western Line	Services to Epping & Hornsby via Strathfield, Penrith & Emu Plains via Gordon	
1	Central Coast & Newcastle Line	2 weekend late night services to Central via Strathfield	
2	North Shore & Western Line	Services to Berowra	
2	Central Coast & Newcastle Line	1 weekend early morning and weekend late night services to Wyong & Newcastle	

=== Transport links ===
CDC NSW operates three bus routes via Mount Colah station, under contract to Transport for NSW:

Pacific Hwy:

- 592: Hornsby station to Brooklyn and Mooney Mooney
- 595: Hornsby station to Arthurs Circle
- 597: Hornsby station to Berowra station and Berowra Heights

== Gallery ==
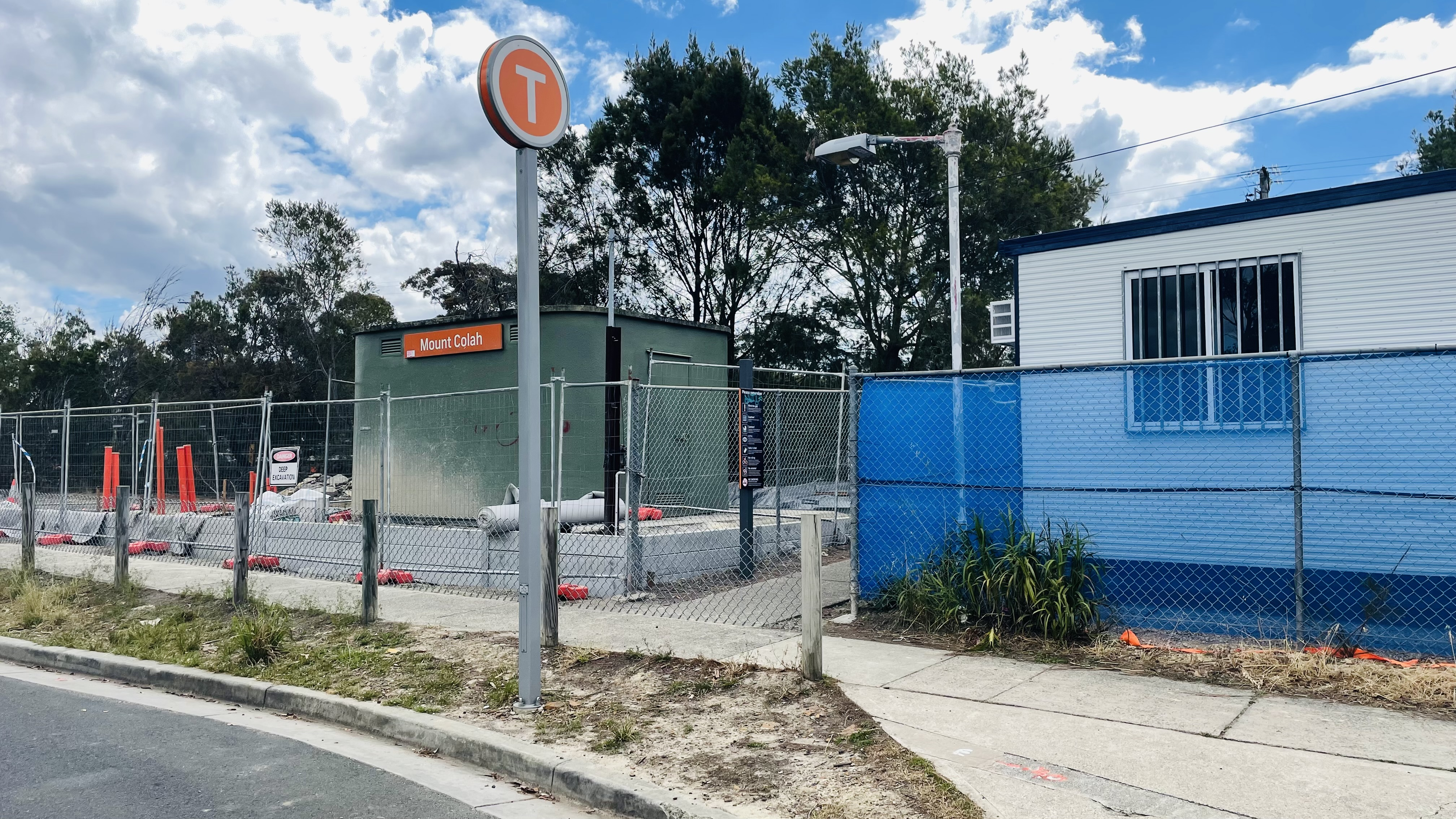
Entrance on Pierre Close in November 2022

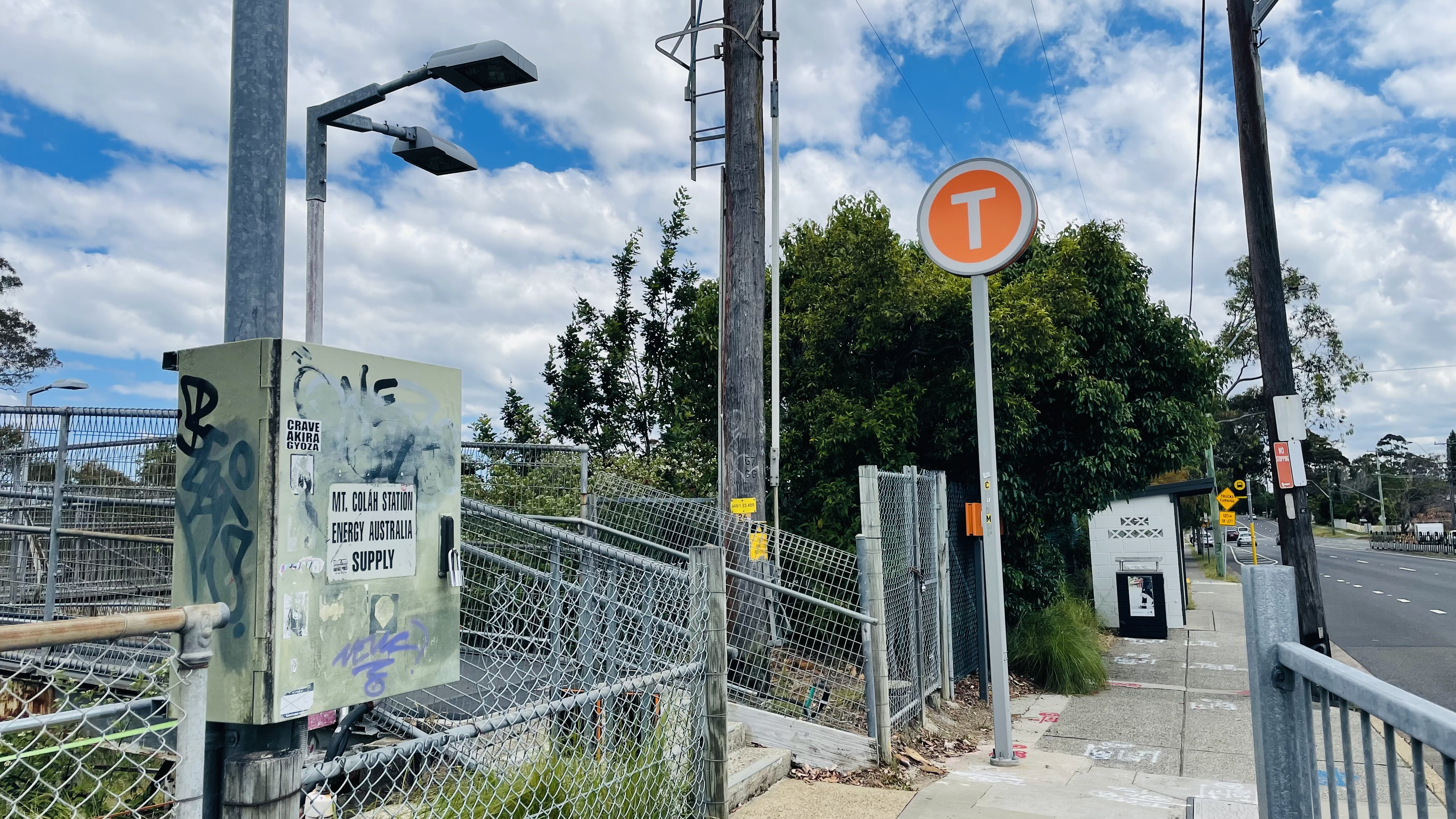
Entrance on Pacific Highway in November 2022

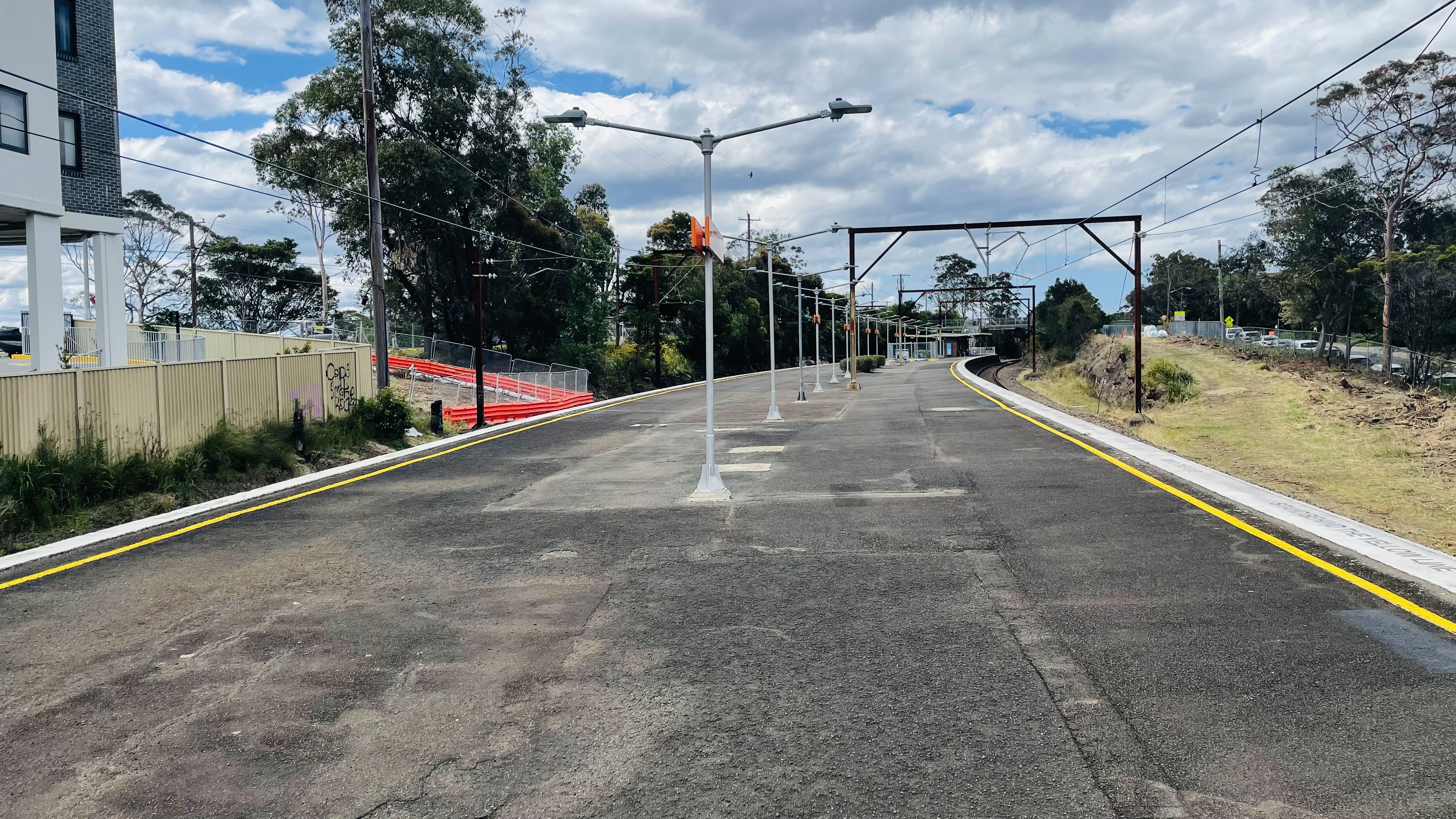
Northbound view in November 2022

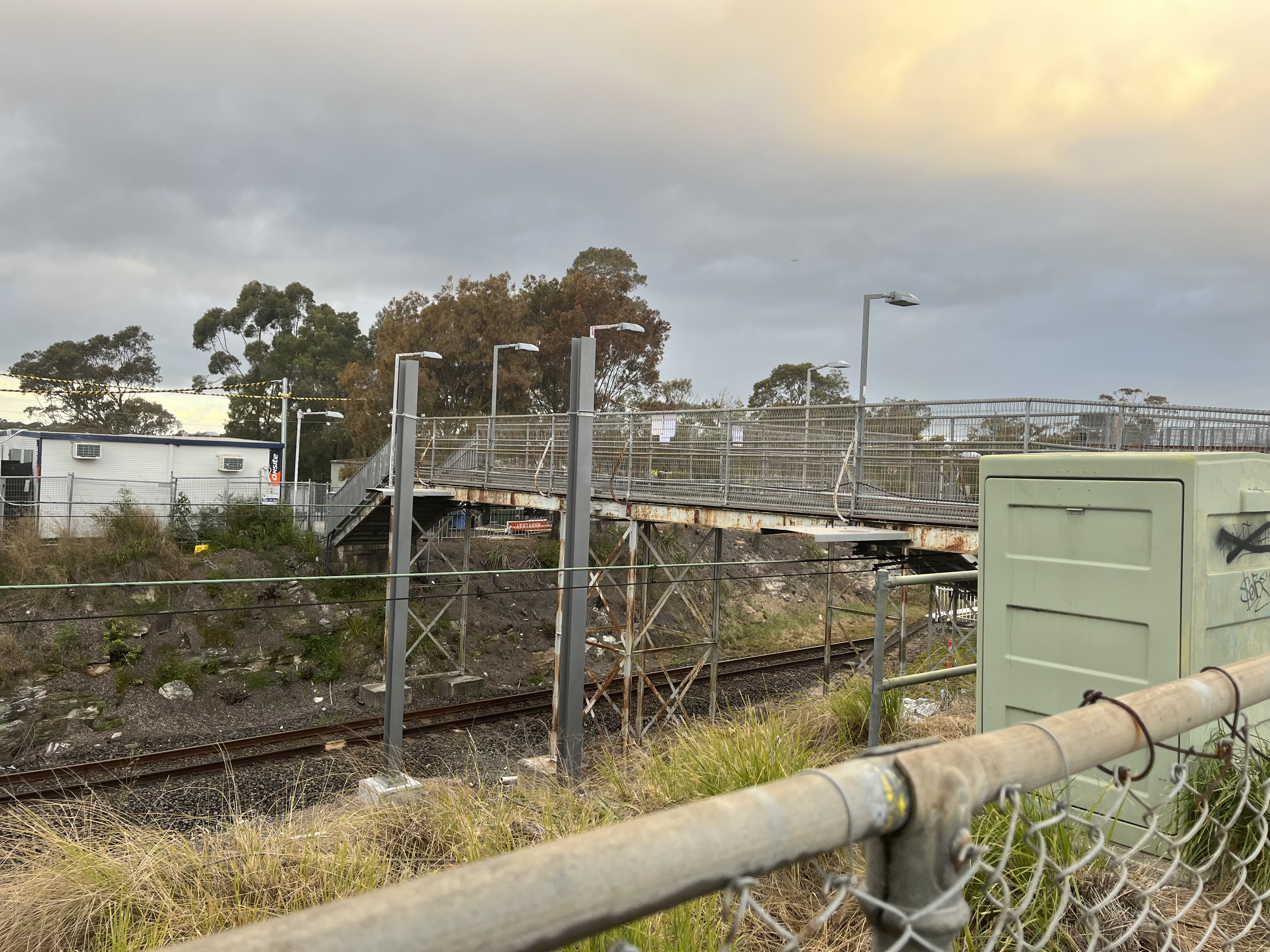
The former footbridge on 1 August 2024, a few days before its demolition
