= Justin Han =

Australian table tennis player

Personal information
- Full name: Justin Han
- Nationality: Australia
- Born: 9 August 1991 (age 35) Heilongjiang, China
- Height: 1.84 m (6.0 ft)
- Weight: 75 kg (165 lb)

Sport
- Sport: Table tennis

Justin (Jiapeng) Han is an Australian table tennis player.

== Personal ==
Born on 9 August 1991, in Harbin, Heilongjiang, China, Han graduated from shichahai Primary School and immigrated to Australia to study (Asquith Boys High School in New South Wales) in 2008. After graduating from Asquith Boys High School, Han studied at the New South Wales Institute of Sport in Sydney, Australia. After graduation Han participated in the 2012 London Olympics.

== Career ==
Han qualified with the Australian Olympic team in 2009 and competed for Australia at the 2012 Summer Olympics.
