= Mount Kuring-gai railway station =

Railway station in Sydney, New South Wales

Mount Kuring-gai
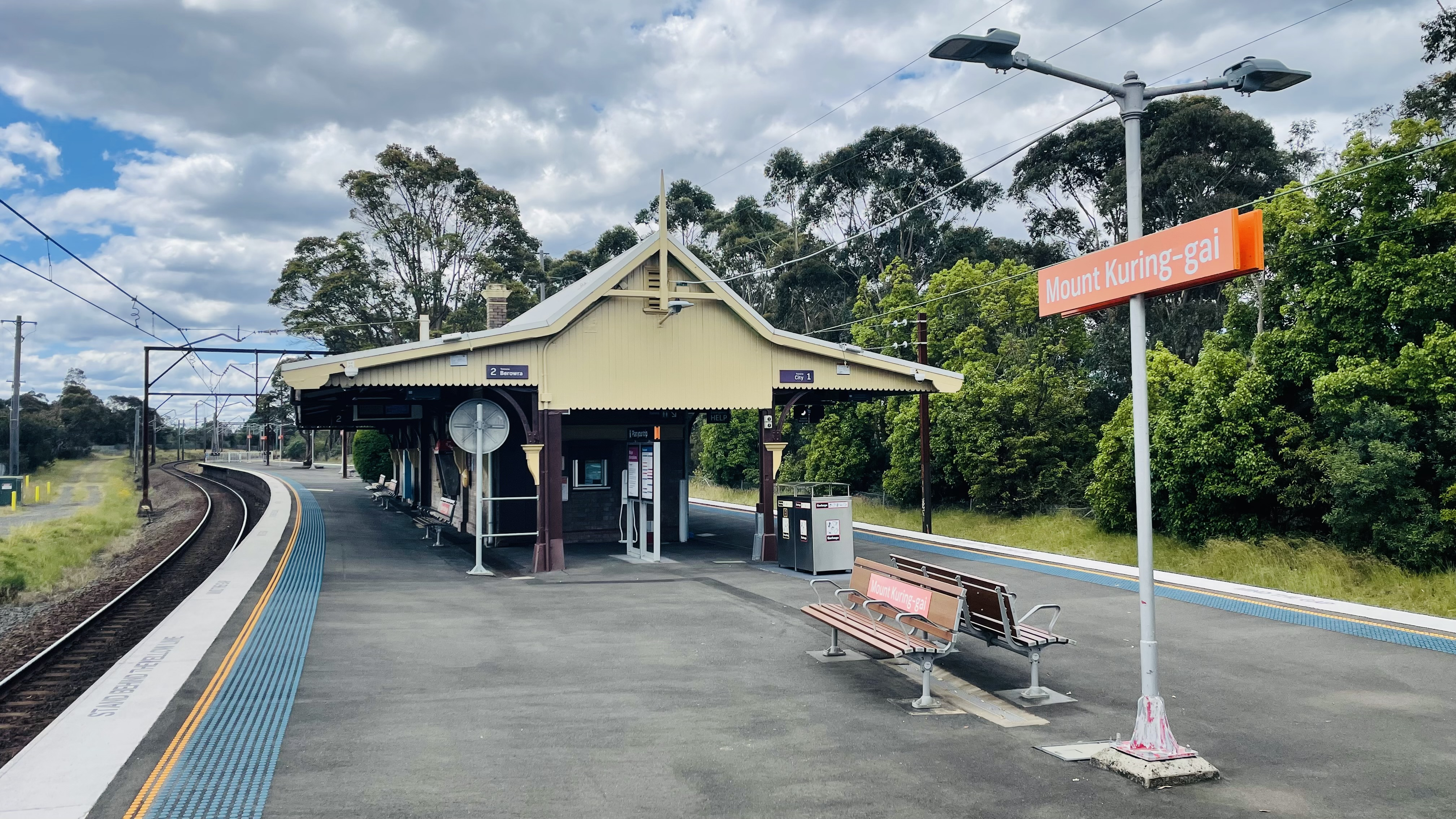
- Northbound view from Platform 2 looking at station building, November 2022

General information
- Location: Pacific Highway, Mount Kuring-gai, New South Wales; Australia
- Coordinates: 33°39′11″S 151°08′13″E
- Elevation: 214 m (702 ft)
- Owner: Transport Asset Manager of New South Wales
- Operator: Sydney Trains
- Line: Main North
- Distance: 40.67 km (25.27 mi) from Central
- Platforms: 2 (1 island)
- Tracks: 2
- Connections: Bus

Construction
- Structure type: Ground
- Accessible: No

Other information
- Status: Weekdays: Staffed: 6am to 2pm: Weekends and public holidays: Unstaffed
- Station code: MKI
- Website: Transport for NSW

History
- Opened: 5 October 1901 (125 years ago)
- Rebuilt: 1909
- Electrified: Yes (from January 1960)
- Former names: Kuring-gai (1901–1904)

Passengers
- 2025: 113,010 (year); 310 (daily) (Sydney Trains)
- Rank: 212

Services
Preceding station	Sydney Trains	Following station
Berowra Terminus	North Shore & Western Line	Mount Colah via Gordon towards City
Preceding station	Intercity Trains	Following station
Berowra towards Newcastle Interchange	Central Coast & Newcastle Line limited services	Mount Colah towards Central
Location

Mount Kuring-gai railway station is a suburban railway station located on the Main North line, serving the Sydney suburb of Mount Kuring-gai. It is served by Sydney Trains T1 North Shore Line services and some early morning and late night intercity Central Coast & Newcastle Line services.

== History ==
Mount Kuring-gai station opened on 5 October 1901 as a passing loop named Kuring-gai, and was originally located north of the present station site. On 1 November 1933, it was renamed Mount Kuring-gai, and rebuilt as the present station in 1909 when the Main Northern line was duplicated.

The station was the terminating point for some suburban services and had a signal box to facilitate these workings. It was removed in April 1988 resulting in all services continuing to Cowan, until 1992 when the CityRail suburban network was curtailed to Berowra.

== Services ==
=== Platforms ===
Platform	Line	Stopping pattern	Notes
1	North Shore & Western Line	Services to Epping & Hornsby via Strathfield, Penrith & Emu Plains via Gordon	
1	Central Coast & Newcastle Line	2 weekend late night services to Central via Strathfield	
2	North Shore & Western Line	Services to Berowra	
2	Central Coast & Newcastle Line	1 weekend early morning and weekend late night services to Wyong & Newcastle	

=== Transport links ===
CDC NSW operates two bus routes via Mount Kuring-gai station, under contract to Transport for NSW:

Pacific Hwy:

- 592: Hornsby station to Mooney Mooney
- 597: Hornsby station to Berowra Heights

== Gallery ==
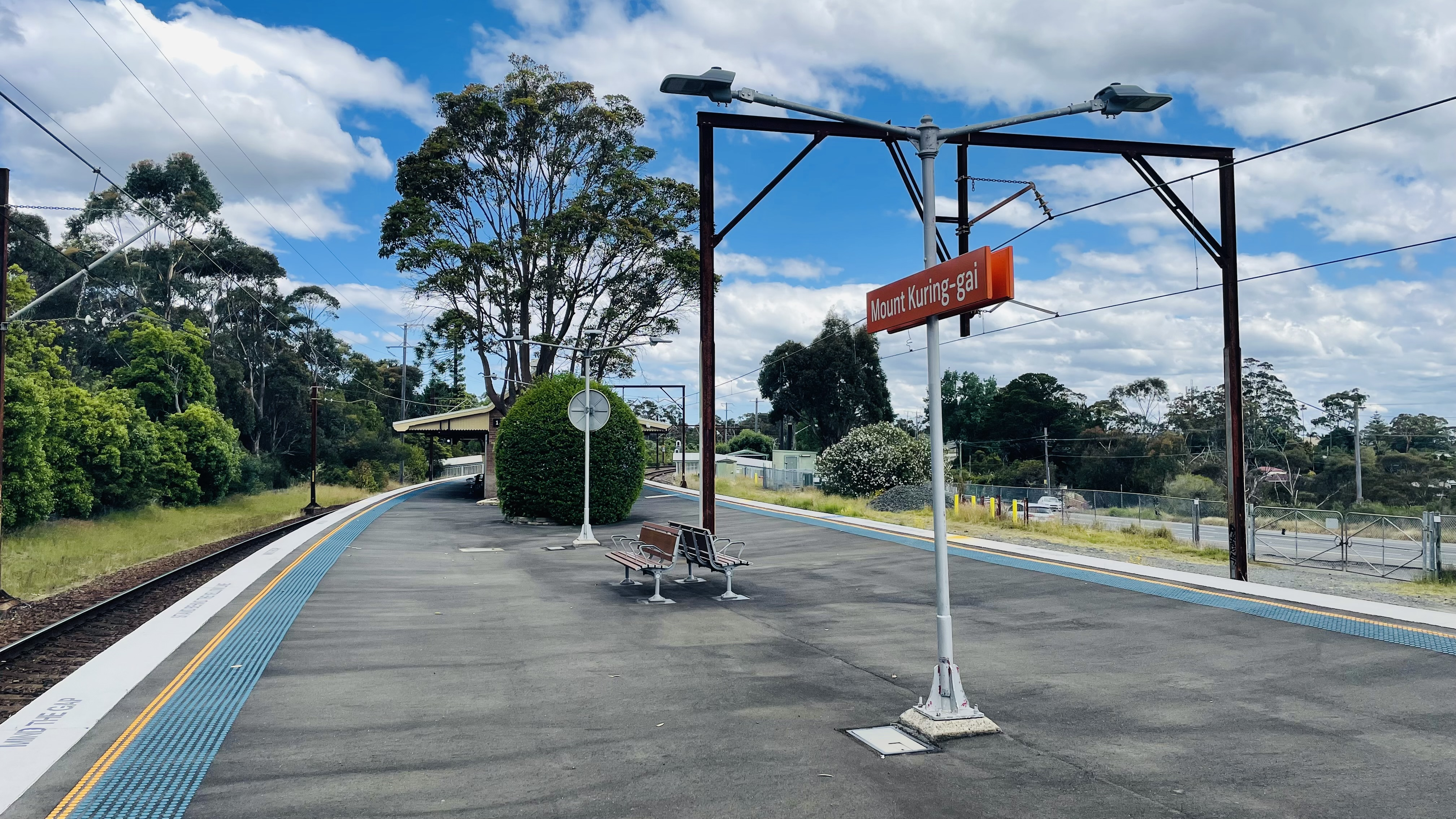
Southbound view from Platform 1 in November 2022

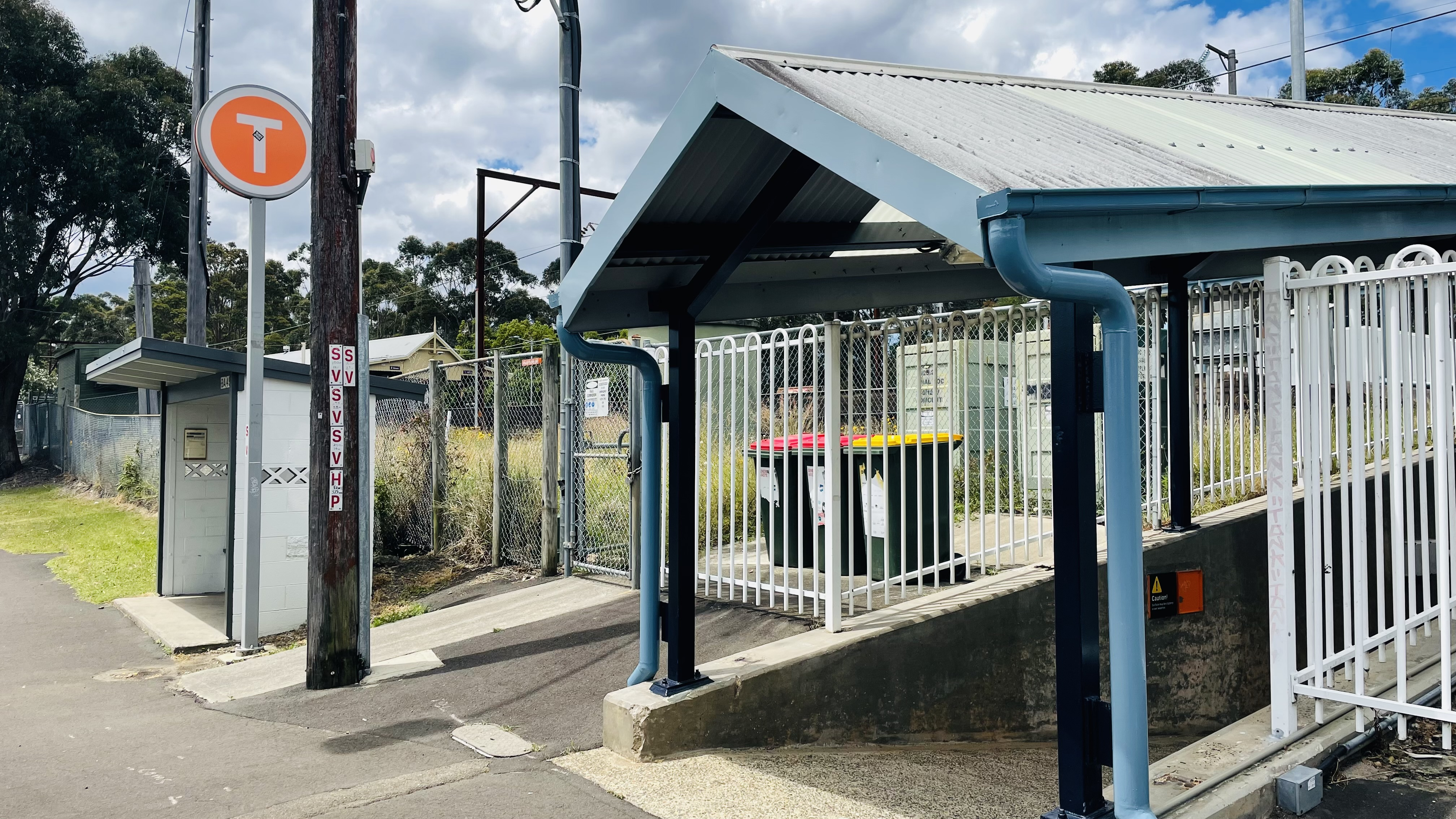
Bus stop and Entrance on Pacific Highway in November 2022

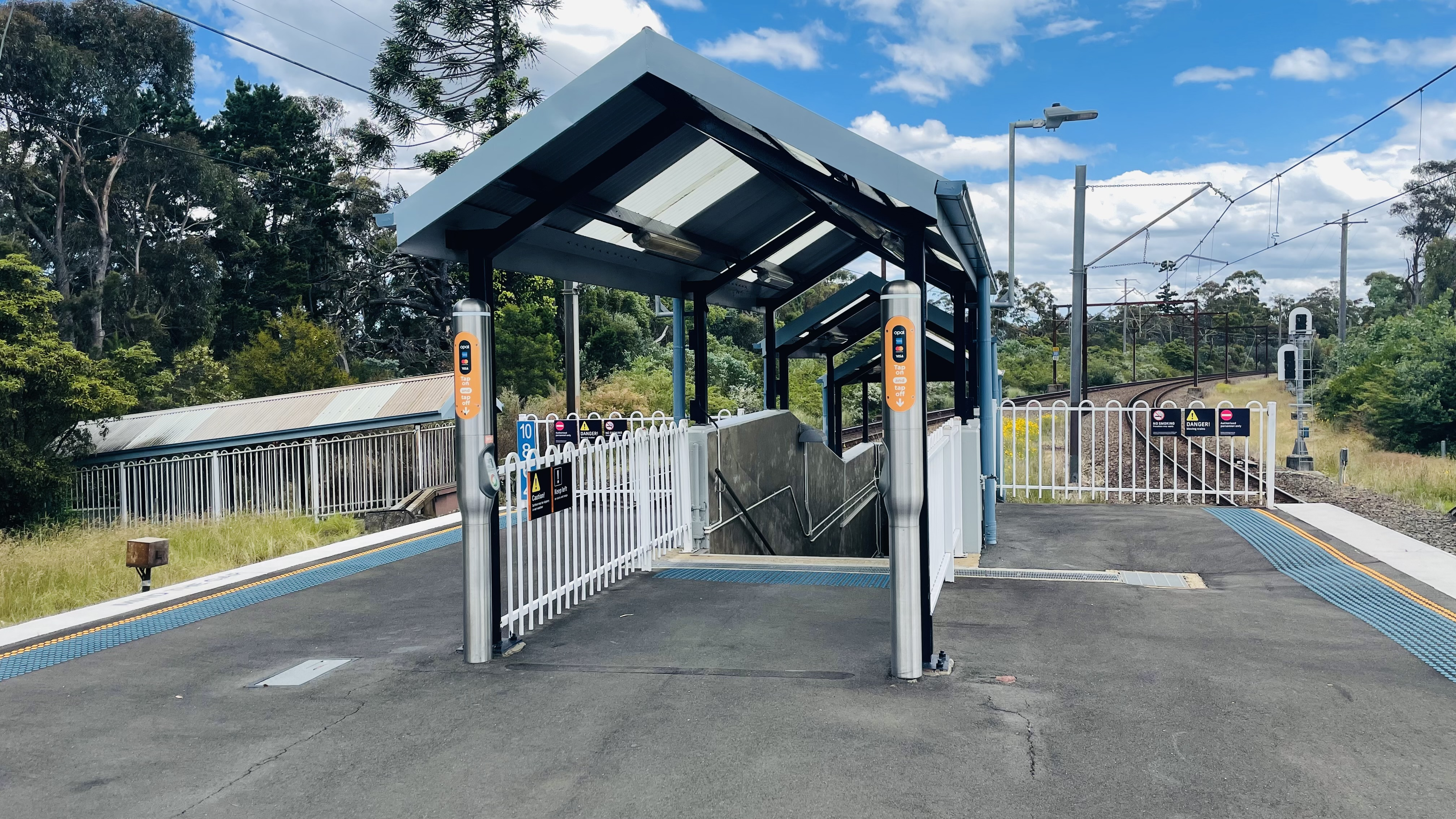
Stairs leading down to exit in November 2022
