= Asquith railway station =

Railway station in Sydney, New South Wales, Australia

Asquith
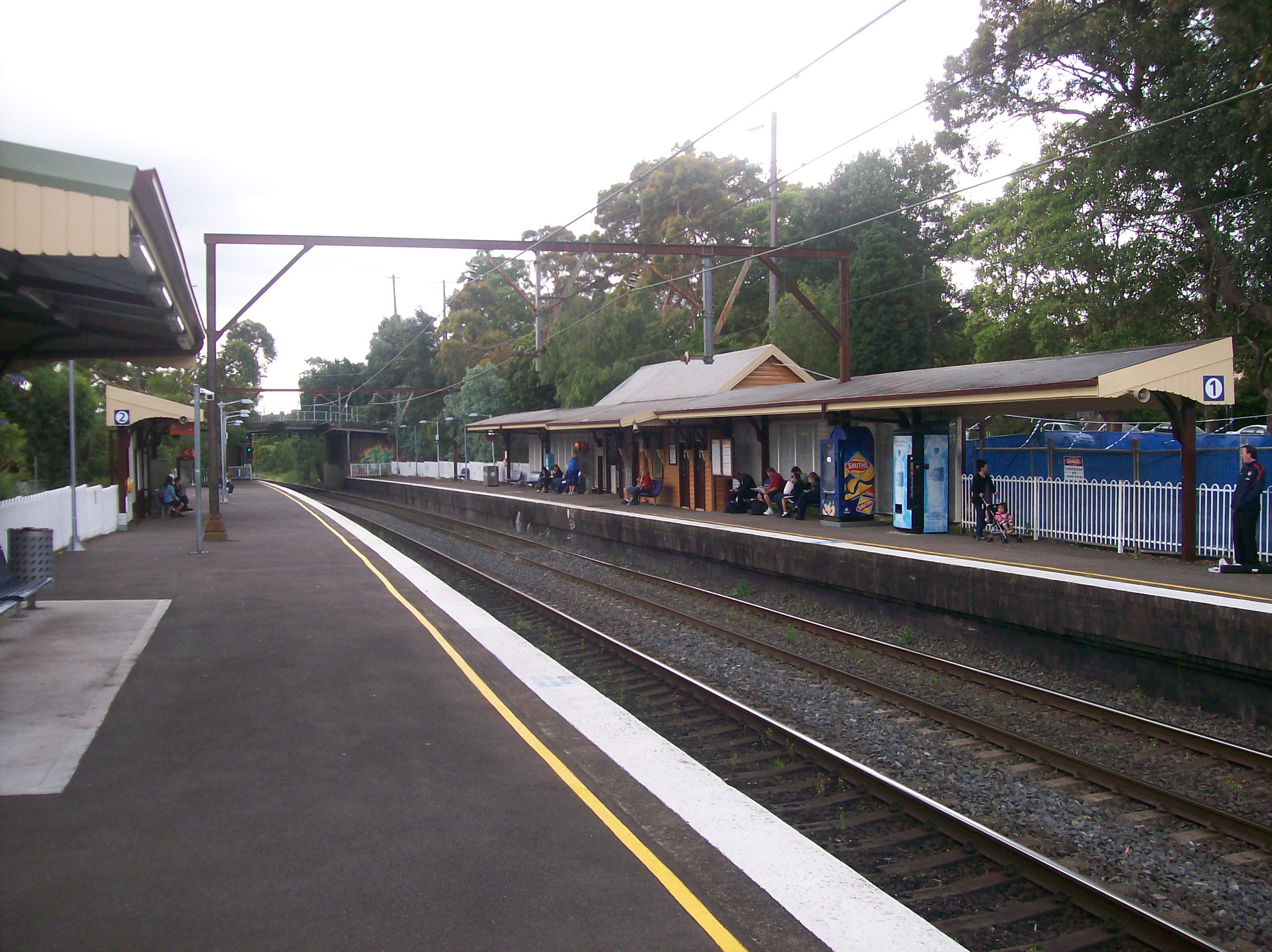
- Northbound view from Platform 2 looking at station buildings, January 2006

General information
- Location: Haldane Street, Asquith, New South Wales; Australia
- Coordinates: 33°41′19″S 151°06′28″E
- Elevation: 186 m (610 ft)
- Owner: Transport Asset Manager of New South Wales
- Operator: Sydney Trains
- Line: Main North
- Distance: 35.69 km (22.18 mi) from Central
- Platforms: 2 (2 side)
- Tracks: 2
- Connections: Bus

Construction
- Structure type: Ground
- Accessible: Yes

Other information
- Status: Weekdays: Staffed: 6am to 7pm: Weekends and public holidays: Unstaffed
- Station code: ASQ
- Website: Transport for NSW

History
- Opened: 1 November 1915 (110 years ago)
- Electrified: Yes (1927)

Passengers
- 2025: 653,954 (year); 1,792 (daily) (Sydney Trains, NSW TrainLink)
- Rank: 145

Services
Preceding station	Sydney Trains	Following station
Mount Colah towards Berowra	North Shore & Western Line	Hornsby via Gordon towards City
Preceding station	Intercity Trains	Following station
Mount Colah Weekends only towards Newcastle Interchange	Central Coast & Newcastle Line Limited services	Hornsby towards Central
Berowra towards Newcastle Interchange	Central Coast & Newcastle Line Limited services	Hornsby towards Central
Location

Asquith railway station is a suburban railway station located on the Main North line, serving the Sydney suburb of Asquith. It is served by Sydney Trains T1 North Shore Line and some early morning and late night Sydney Trains intercity Central Coast & Newcastle Line services.

== History ==
Asquith station opened on 1 November 1915. South of the station lies Hornsby Maintenance Depot.

== Services ==
=== Platforms ===
Platform	Line	Stopping pattern	Notes
1	North Shore & Western Line	Services to Epping & Hornsby via Strathfield, Penrith & Emu Plains via Gordon	
1	Central Coast & Newcastle Line	Limited services to Central via Strathfield	
2	North Shore & Western Line	Services to Berowra	
2	Central Coast & Newcastle Line	Limited services to Wyong & Newcastle; 1 evening peak service to Gosford	

=== Transport links ===
CDC NSW operates three bus routes via Asquith station, under contract to Transport for NSW:

Pacific Hwy:

- 592: Hornsby station to Brooklyn and Mooney Mooney
- 595: Hornsby station to Arthurs Circle
- 597: Hornsby station to Berowra station
