= Jordan Smylie =

Australian soccer player

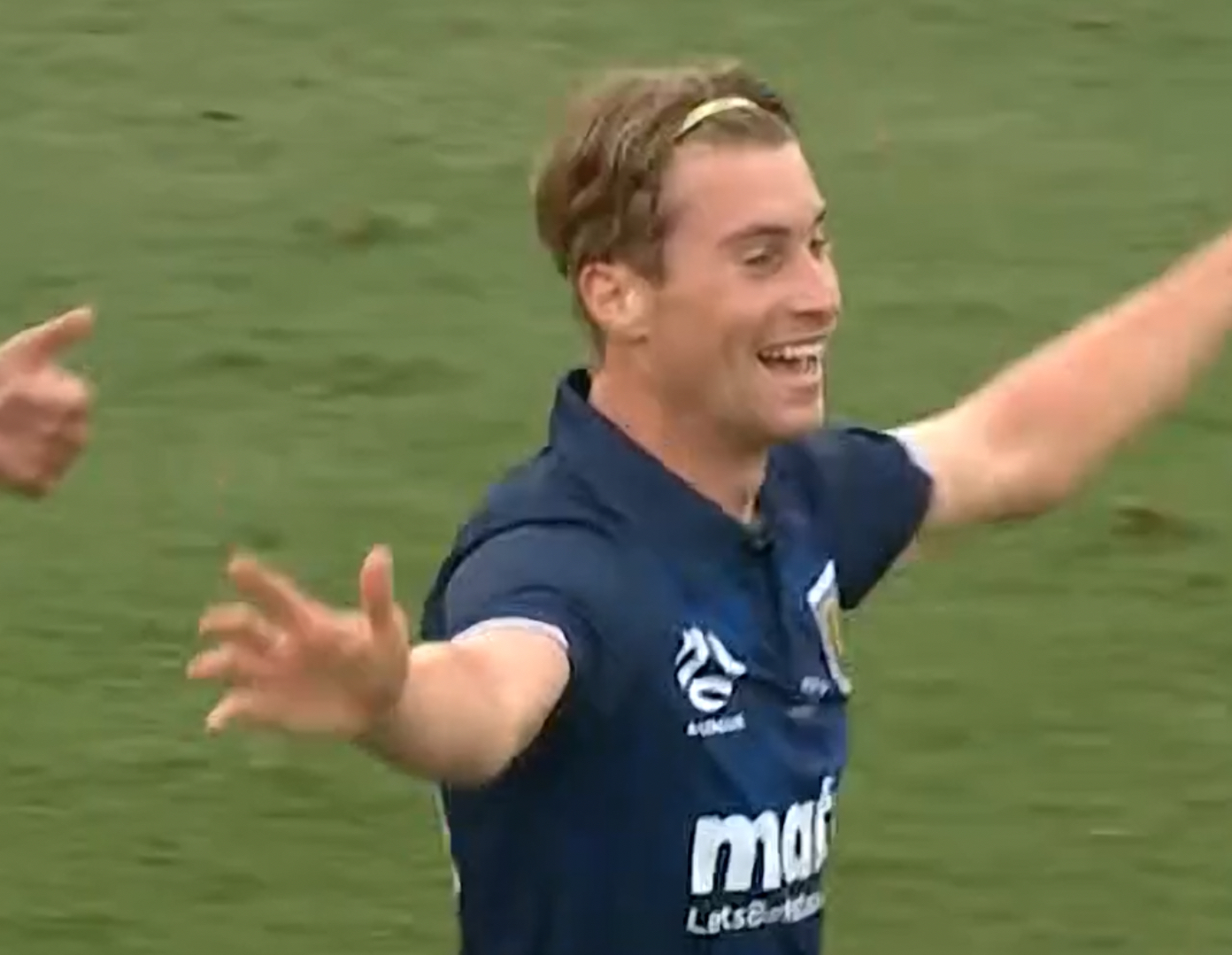
- Smylie celebrating a goal

Personal information
- Full name: Jordan Thomas William Smylie
- Date of birth: 28 February 2000 (age 26)
- Place of birth: Australia
- Position: Forward

Team information
- Current team: Reynir Sandgerði
- Number: 10

Youth career
- Berowra FC
- 2012–15: Mongo Football Academy
- 2015–17: Northern Tigers
- 2017–2018: Central Coast Mariners

Senior career*
Years	Team	Apps	(Gls)
2017	Northern Tigers	23	(10)
2018–2021	CCM Academy	57	(19)
2018–2021	Central Coast Mariners	13	(1)
2021–2022	Blacktown City	18	(11)
2023	Keflavík	12	(1)
2023	→ Haukar (loan)	9	(1)
2024	→ Dandenong Thunder SC	16	(5)
2025	→ Reynir Sandgerði	27	(17)
- * Club domestic league appearances and goals as of 24 September 2025 ‡ National team caps and goals as of 31 March 2018

Jordan Smylie (born 28 February 2000) is an Australian professional footballer who most recently played as a forward for Icelandic club Reynir Sandgerði.

== Early life ==
Smylie attended Asquith Boys High School in Northern Sydney.

== Playing career ==
Smylie joined Central Coast Mariners Academy from Northern Tigers in October 2017. He made his A-League debut for Central Coast Mariners against Brisbane Roar on 31 March 2018, coming on as a substitute in a 1–0 loss at Suncorp Stadium.

In September 2021, Smylie left Central Coast Mariners to join National Premier Leagues NSW side Blacktown City. He made his debut for Blacktown against the Mariners in the 2021 FFA Cup on 13 November 2021.

In February 2023, Smylie joined Icelandic club Keflavík on a two-year contract.

== Honours ==
Blacktown City

- National Premier Leagues NSW Men's Championship: 2022
