= Commonwealth Place, Canberra =

Coordinates: 35°17′49″S 149°8′3″E

Commonwealth Place is located on the southern shore of Lake Burley Griffin, Canberra. It lies along the 'water axis' running along the lake from Black Mountain. Commonwealth Place is the location of the Gallery of Australian Design, Reconciliation Place, a restaurant and Speakers Square. Walter Burley Griffin, the architect who designed Canberra, envisaged that the area would be the site of a "water gate" which would have a terrace above it, providing a "forum for the people". Griffin's vision was for a long time left unrecognised but as of 2005 the area was being developed to reflect the original plan.

Speakers Square, at the centre of Commonwealth Place is a concave shaped grassed area with a paved mural in the middle which was a gift to Australia from the Government of Canada to mark the Centenary of Australian Federation. A display of international flags lines the lake shore, one flag for each nation with a diplomatic mission in the capital. Flags include those of the United Nations, European Union and the Holy See.

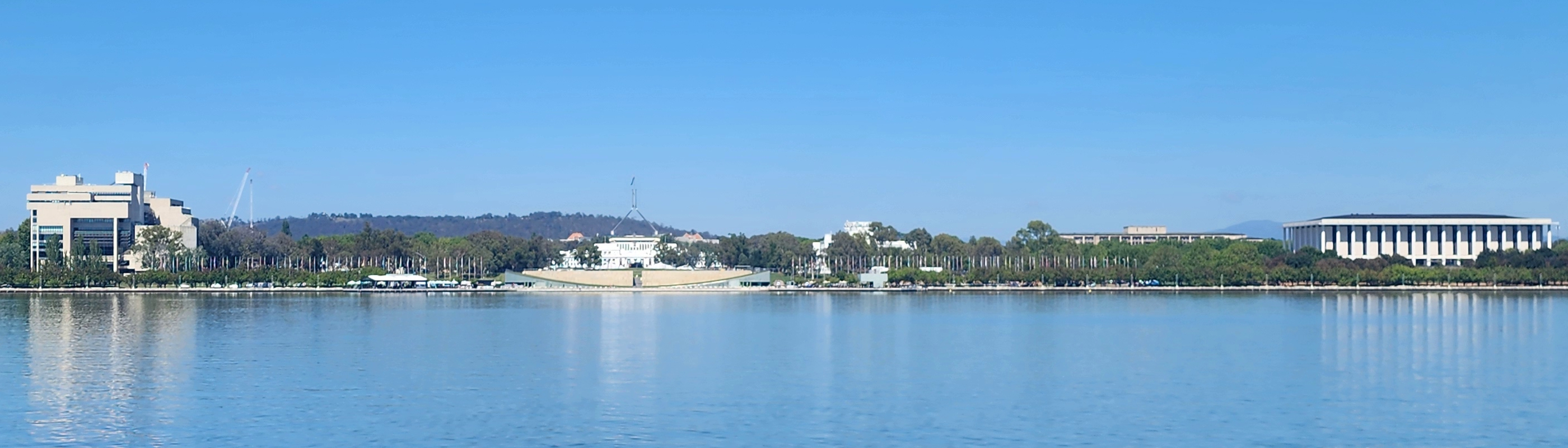
Commonwealth Place is located along the south shore of Lake Burley Griffin. The High Court Building is to the left of the image. The National Gallery of Australia is on the most left. The white building in the middle is the Old Parliament House, with the new Parliament House behind it. Questacon is the white building with the cylindrical top, located to the right. On the right side of Questacon, Treasury Building is located. National Library of Australia is on the most right.

== Gallery ==
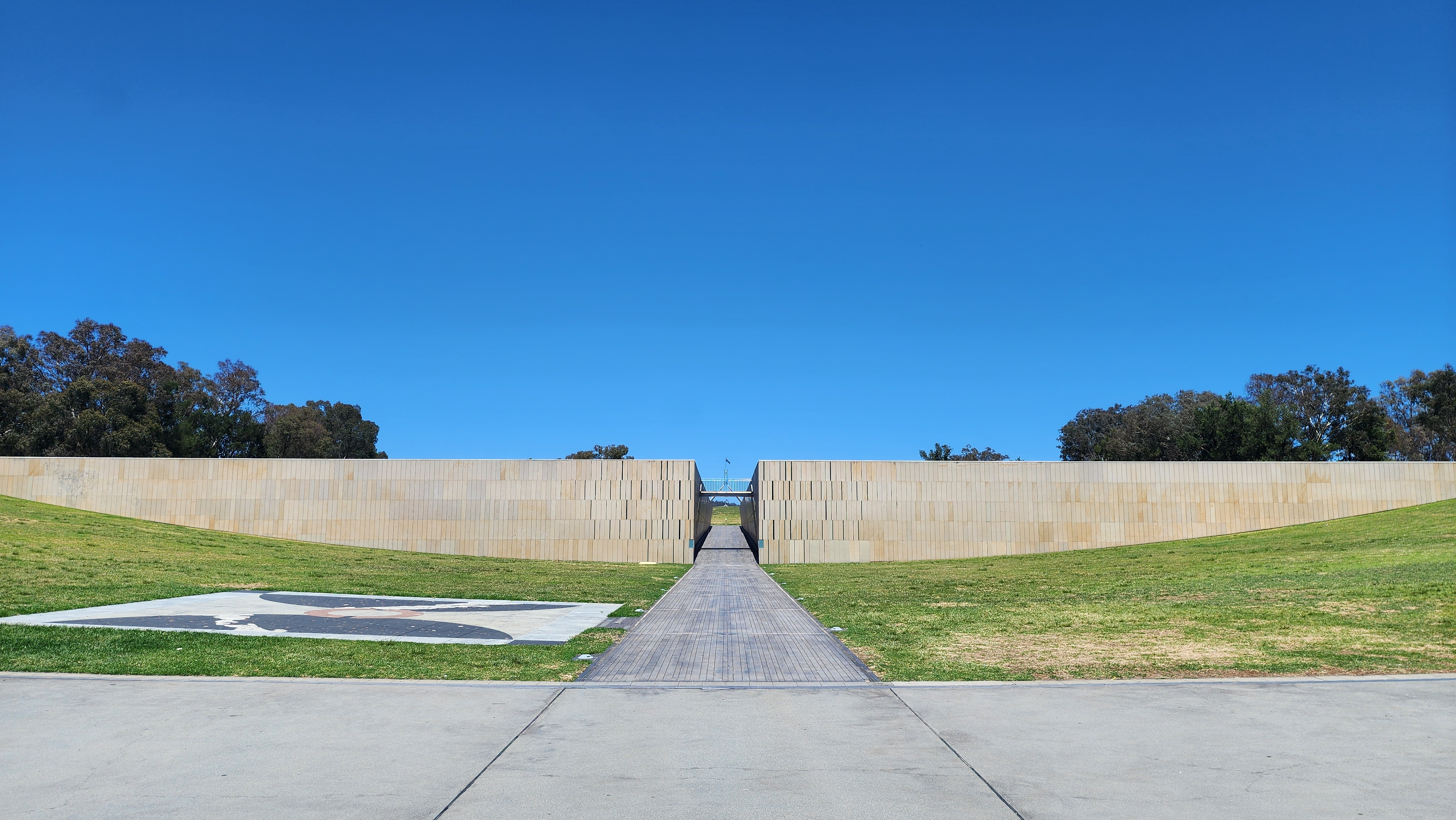
Wide view

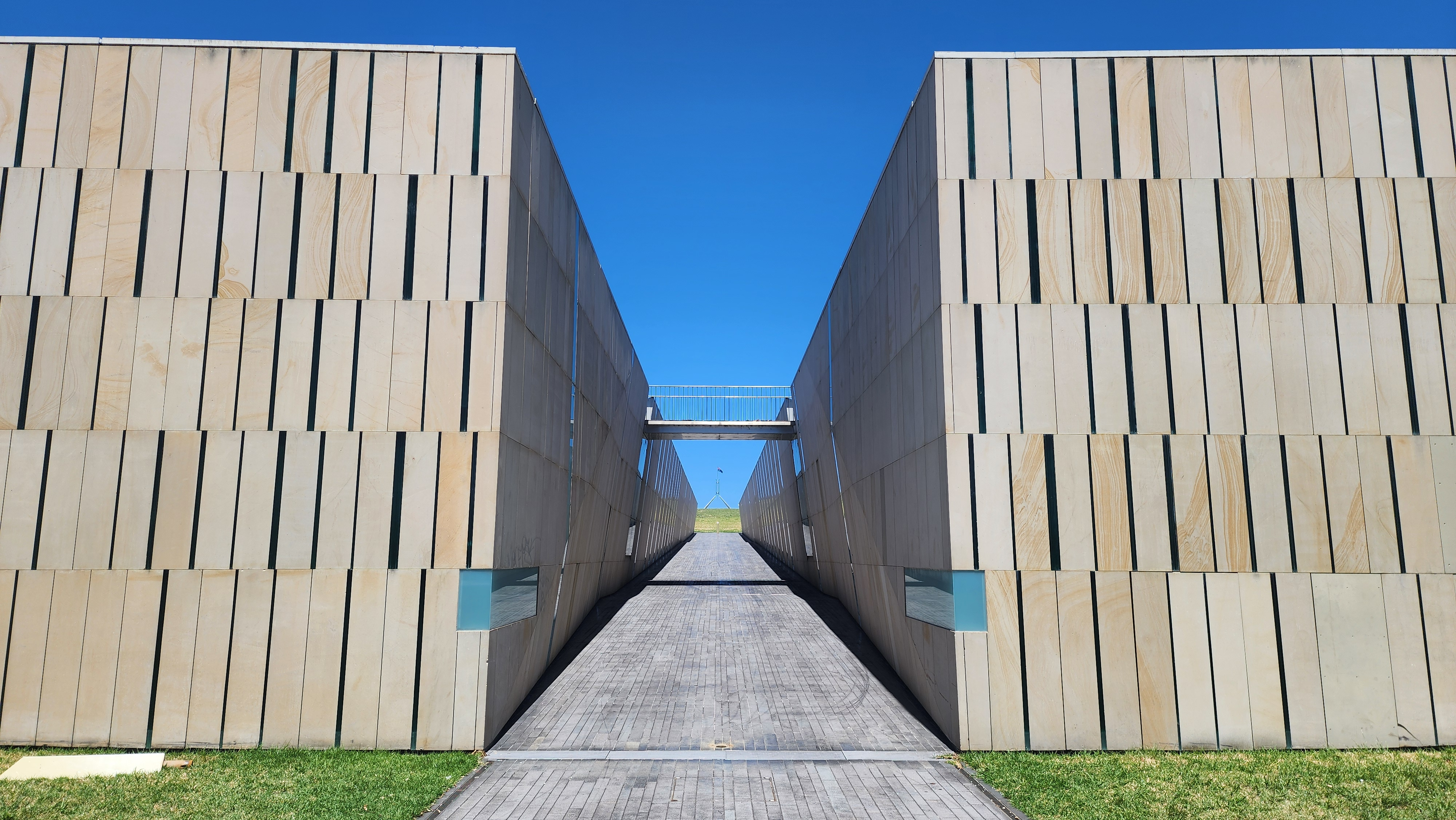
Landscape view of walkway

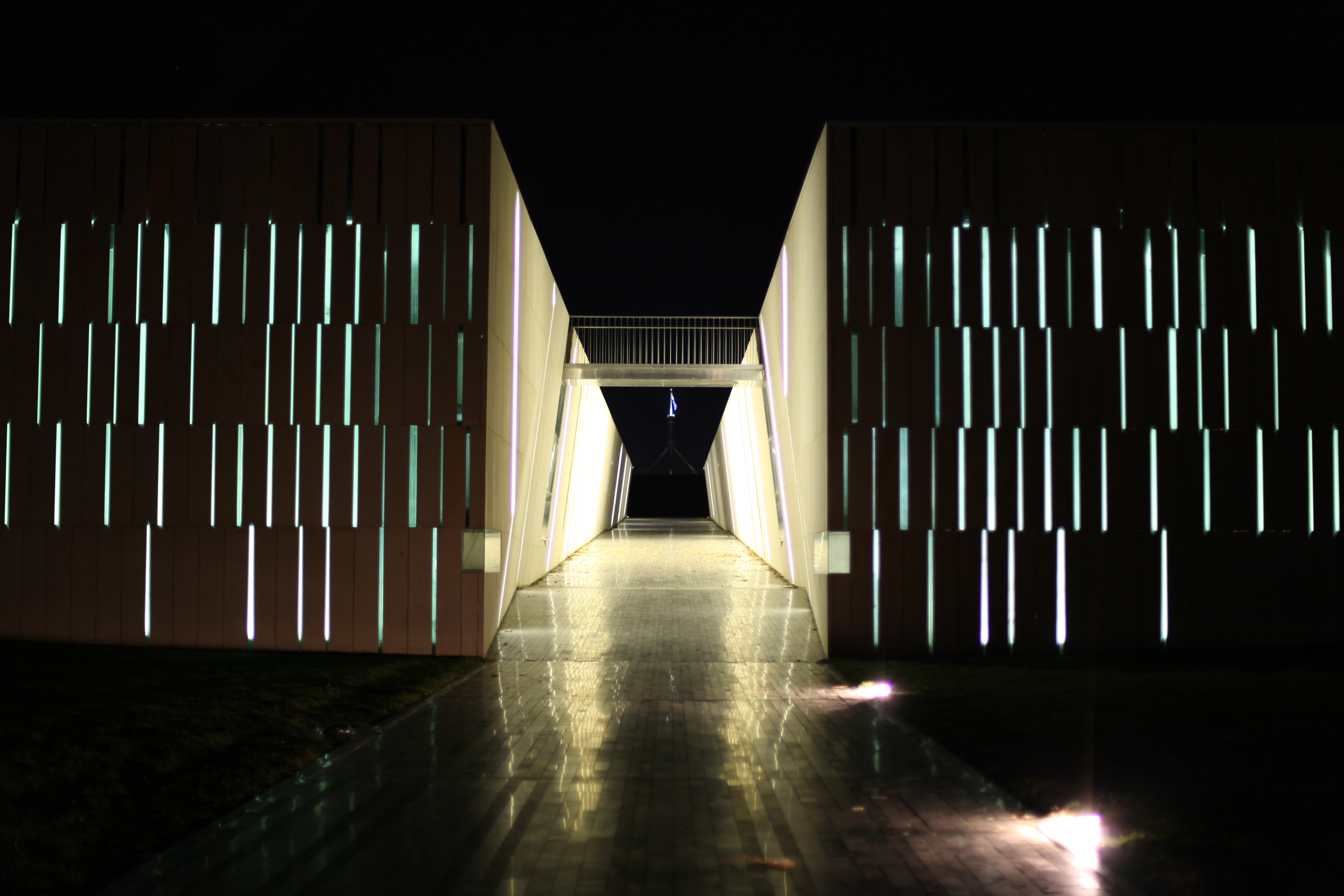
At night

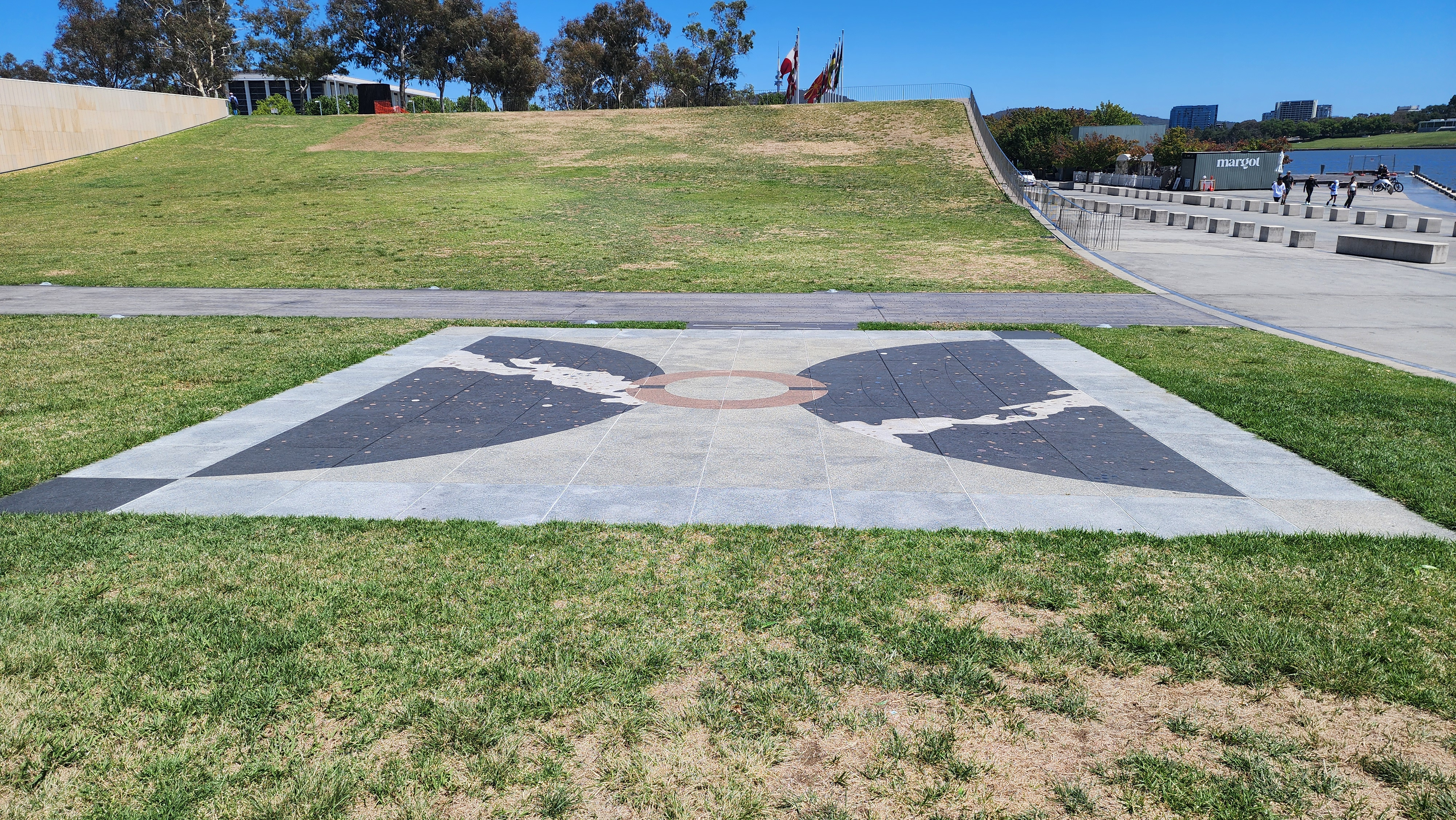
Canada's gift in honour of Australia's centenary of federation.jpg

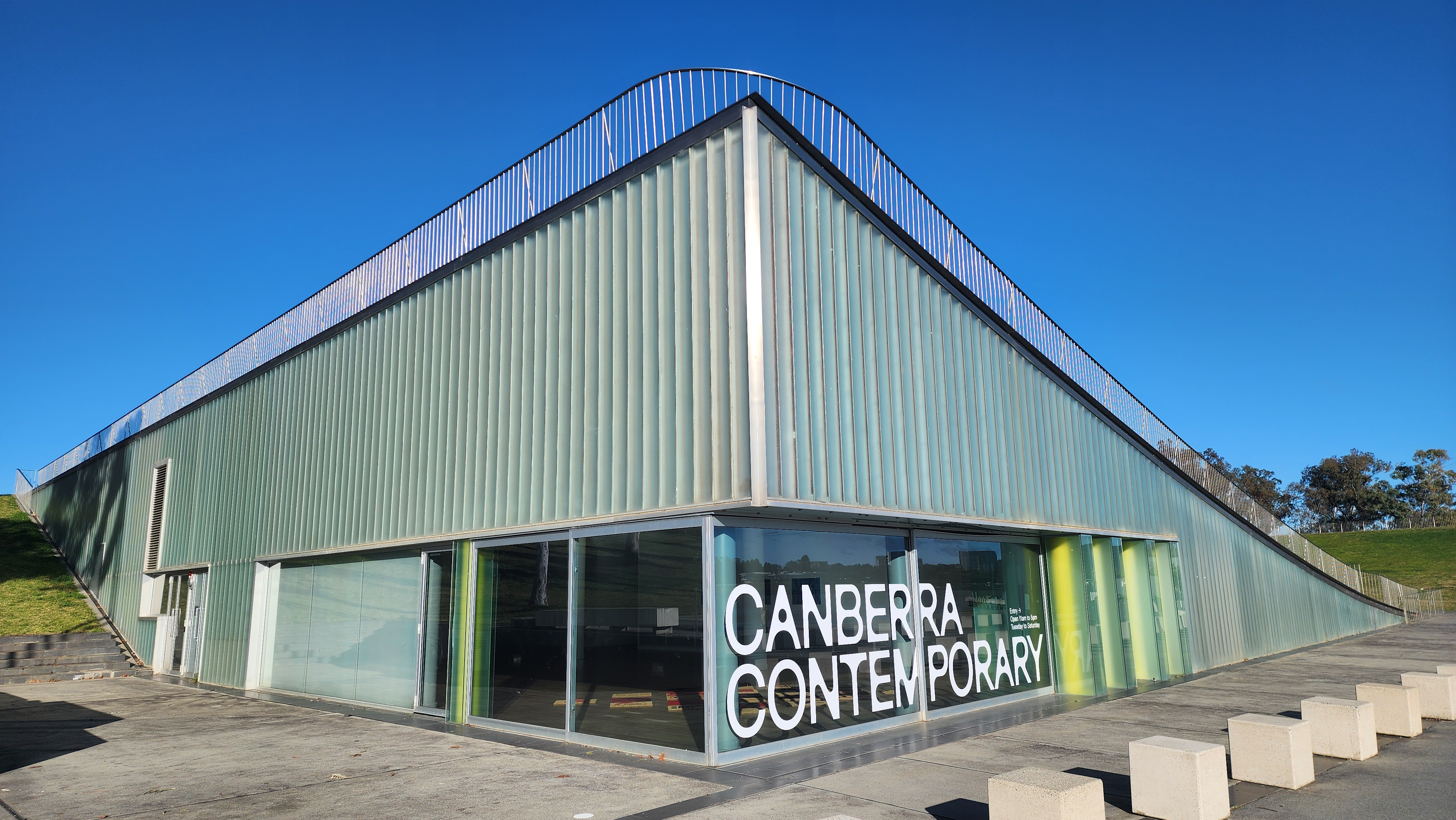
Canberra Contemporary

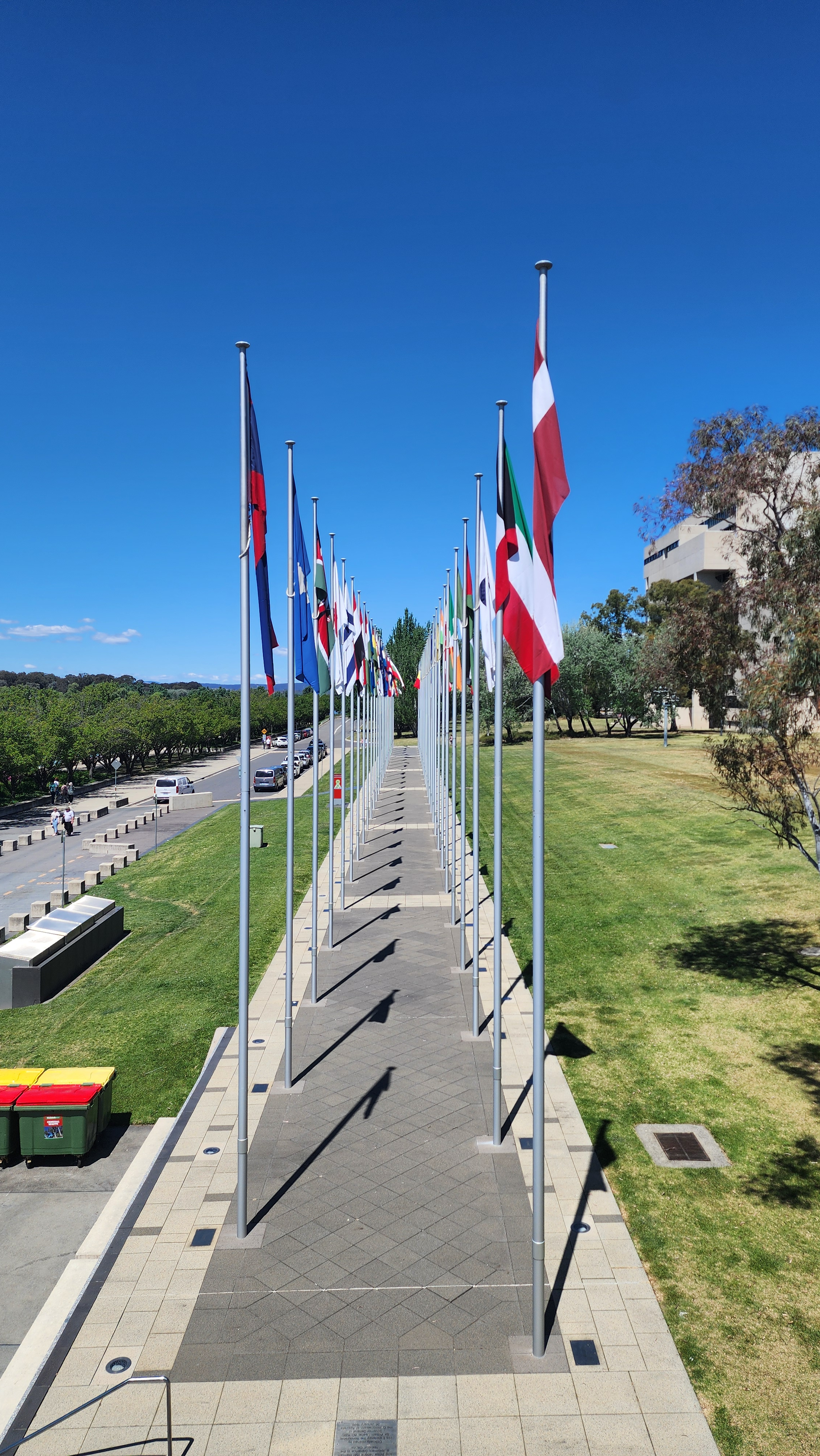
Flag poles at the east side

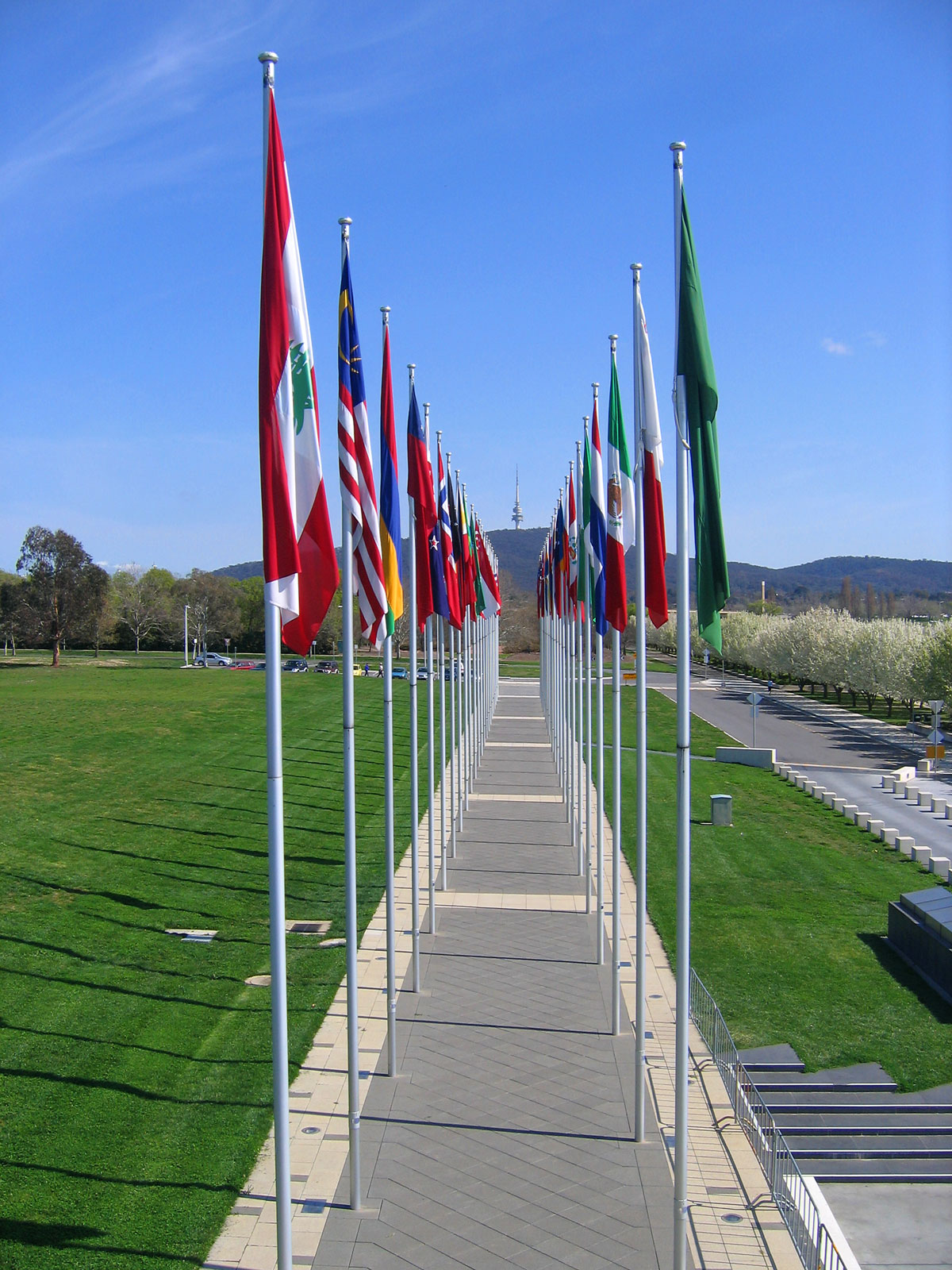
Flag poles at the west side

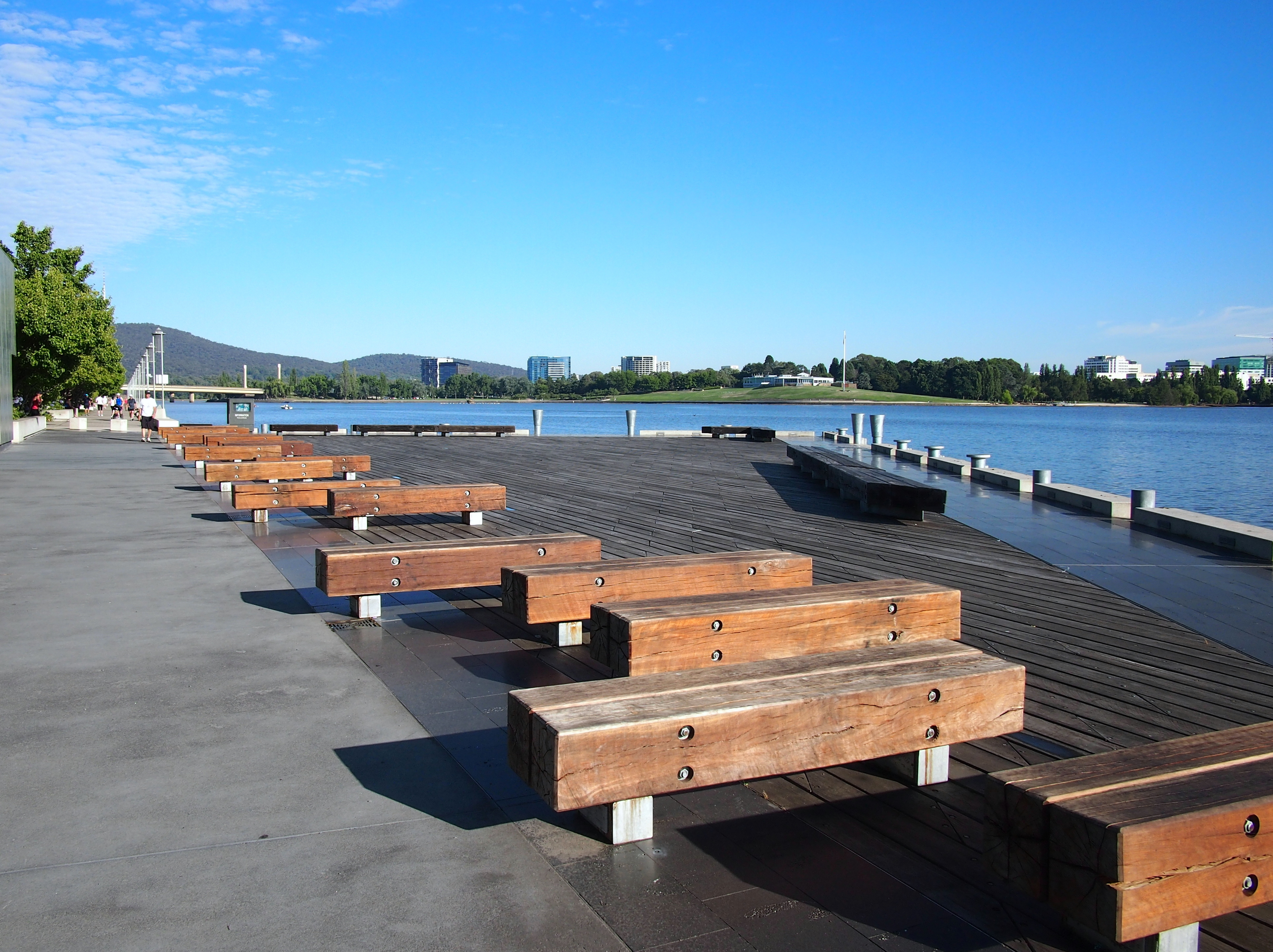
Benches in Commonwealth Place

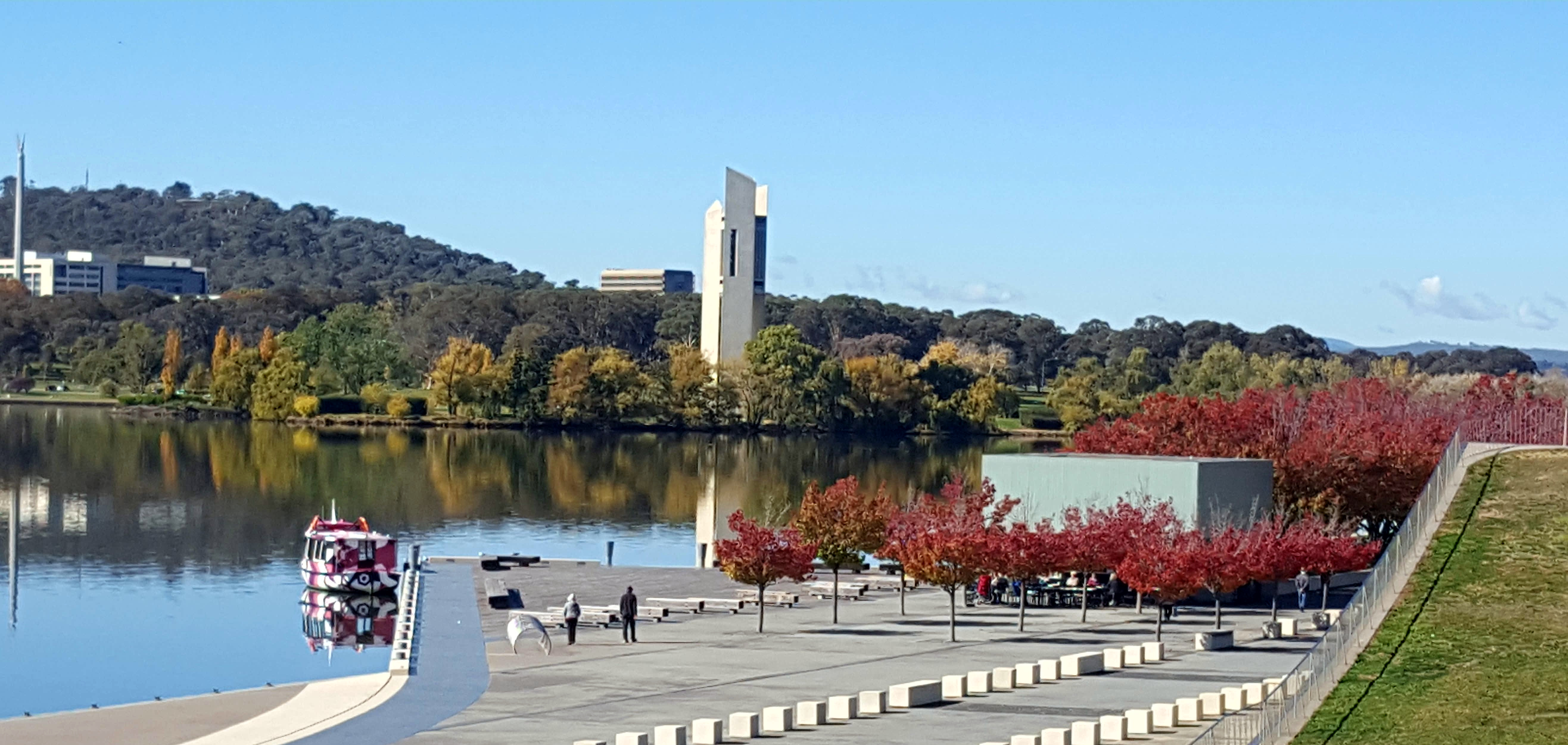
View of the National Carillon from Commonwealth Place

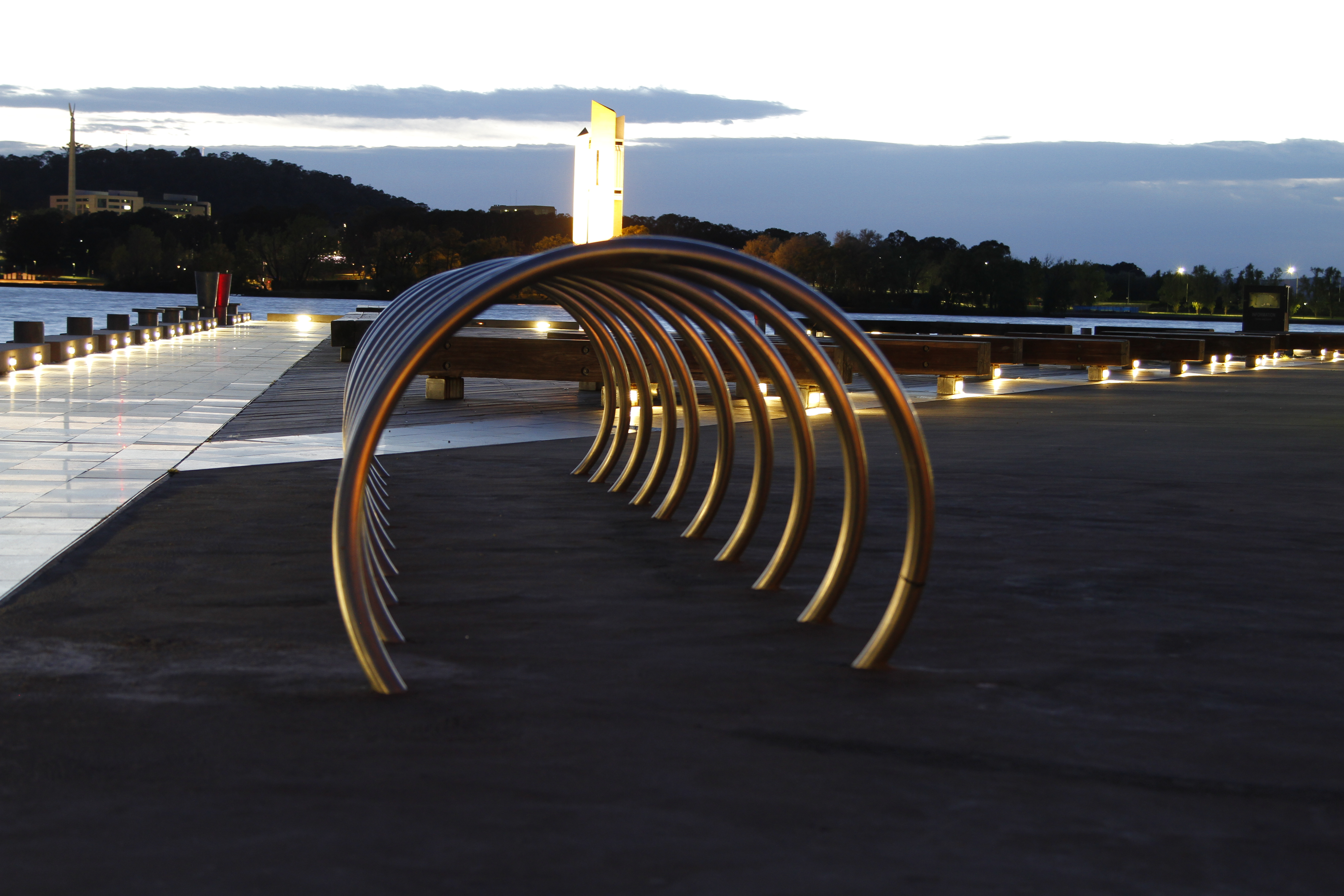
View of the National Carillon from Commonwealth Place in the early morning light

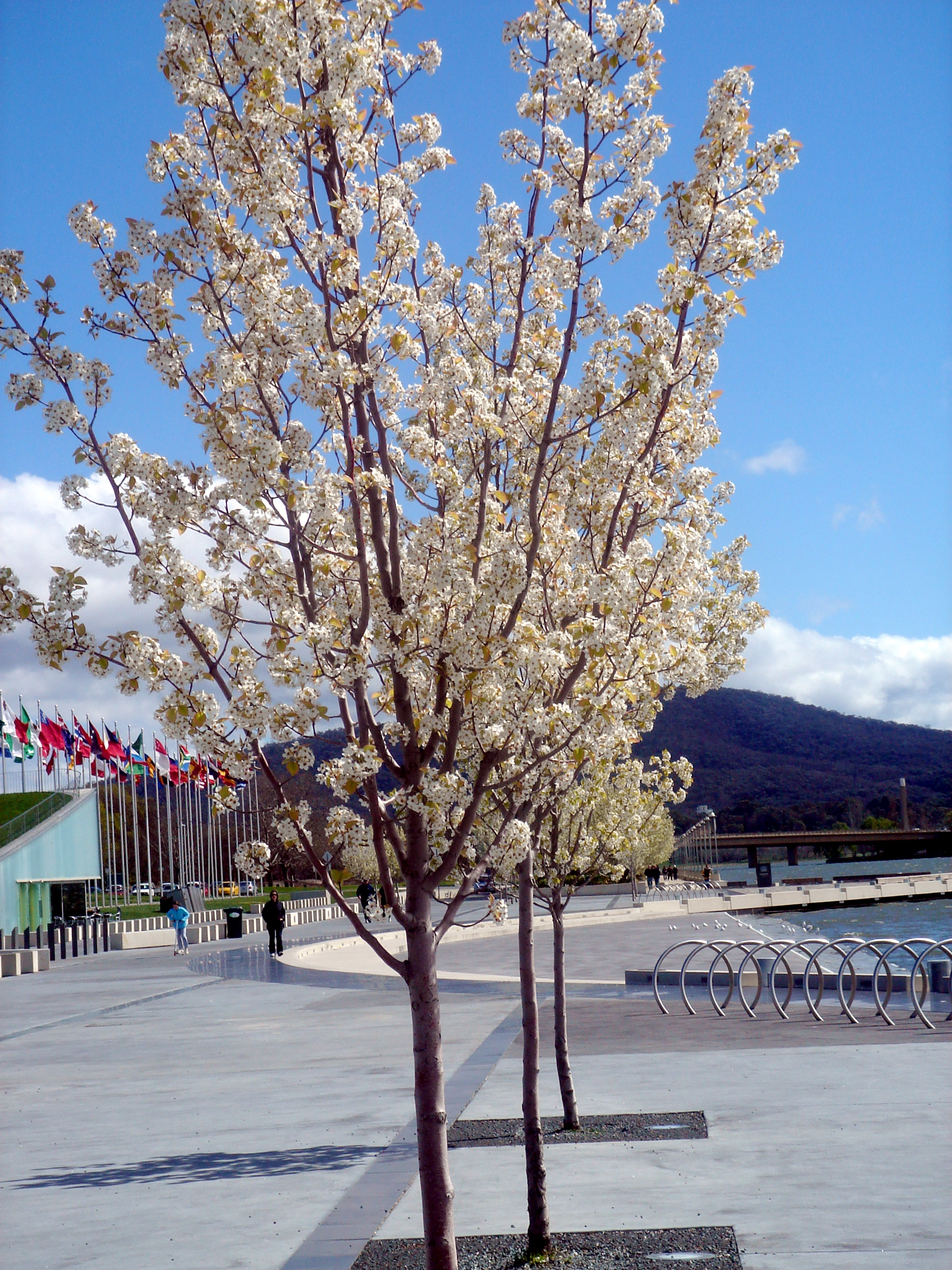
Spring at Commonwealth Place
