= Asquith, New South Wales =

Asquith
- Suburb
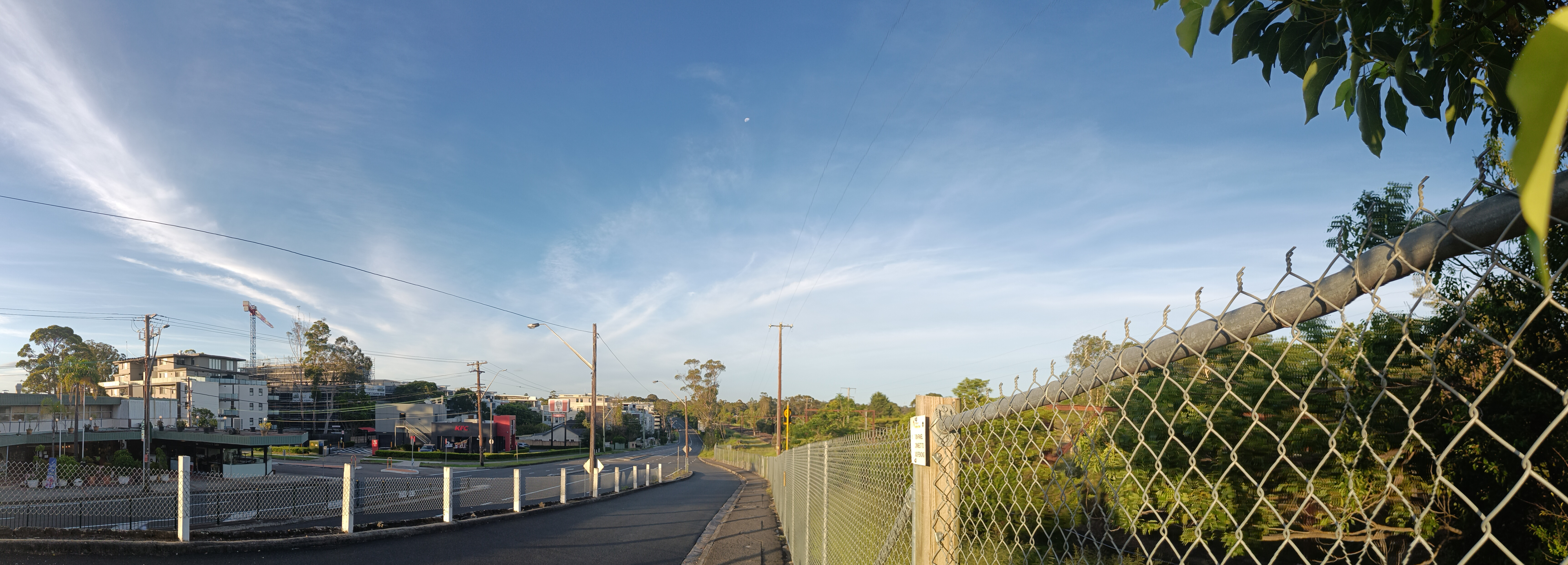
- Asquith

- Interactive map of Asquith
- Location in Metropolitan Sydney
- Country: Australia
- State: New South Wales
- City: Sydney
- LGA: Hornsby Shire
- Location: 26 km (16 mi) north-west of Sydney CBD
- Established: 1915

Government
  - State electorate: Hornsby
  - Federal division: Berowra
- Elevation: 183 m (600 ft)

Population
  - Total: 6,160 (2021 census)
- Postcode: 2077
Suburbs around Asquith
Hornsby Heights	Mount Colah	Mount Colah
Hornsby	Asquith	North Wahroonga
Hornsby	Hornsby	Waitara

Asquith is a suburb in Sydney Northern Sydney or Upper North Shore in the state of New South Wales, Australia. Asquith is located 26 km north-west of the Sydney central business district, in the local government area of Hornsby Shire. The suburb contains a section of Ku-ring-gai Chase National Park on its eastern side.

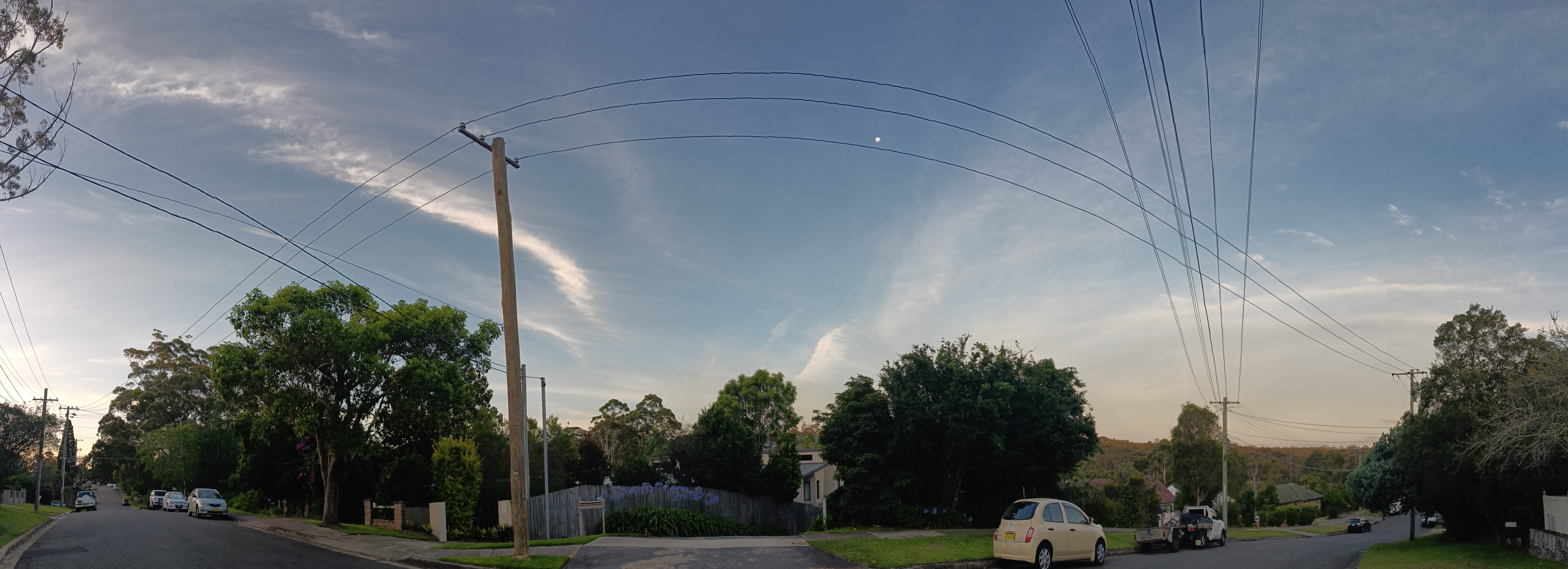
Asquith 2023

== History ==
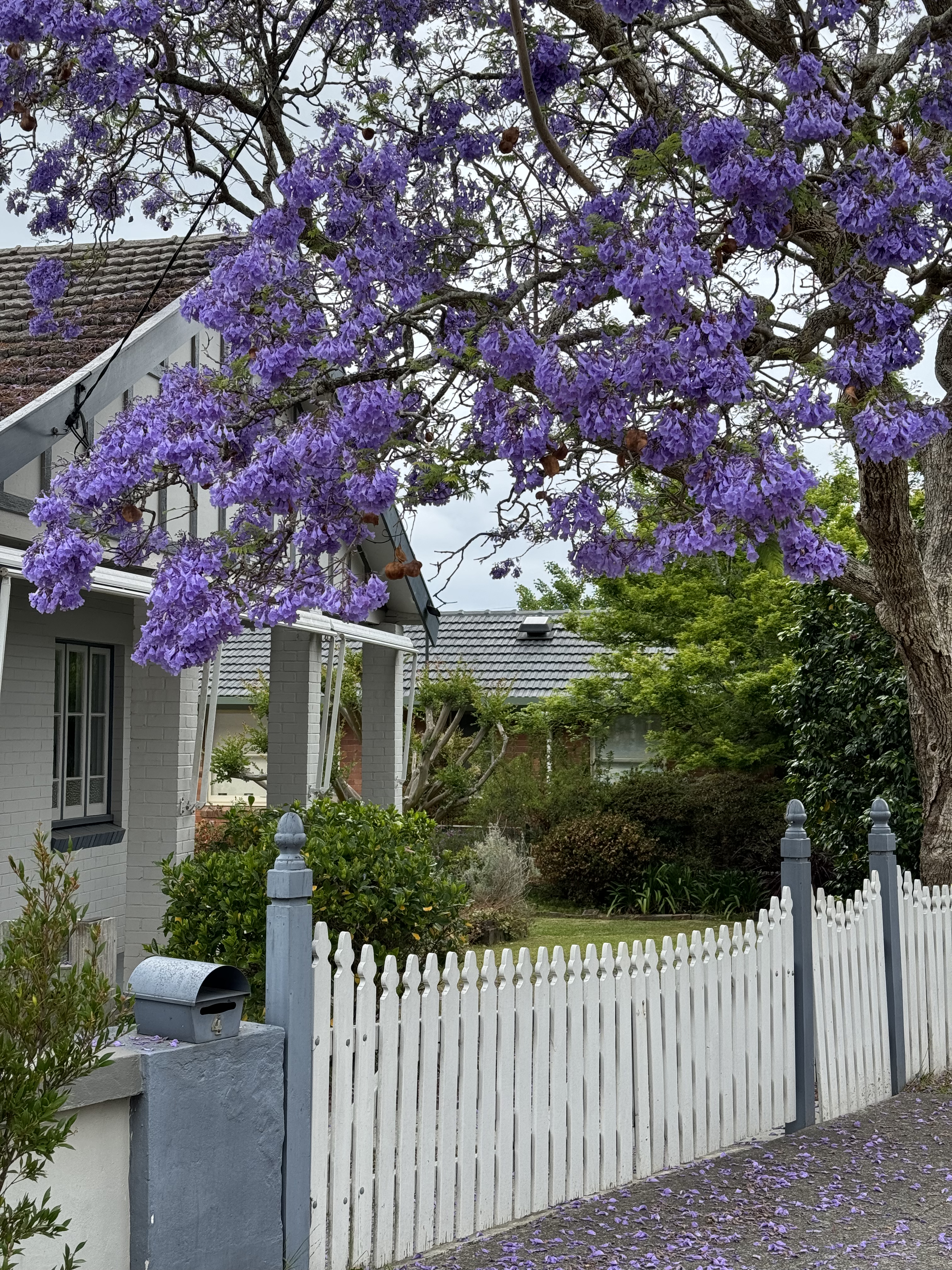
A 20th century cottage with jacaranda tree in full bloom

Asquith was named in 1915 after the then prime minister of the United Kingdom, H. H. Asquith.

Asquith railway station opened on 1 November 1915, in conjunction with land released by R. Halloran & Company. Asquith post office opened on 27 September 1920 and Asquith school opened during March 1930.

Wrigley's Chewing Gum opened its first Australian office in 1961 in Asquith, and continues to operate from the same site.

== Demographics ==
According to the 2021 census of population, there were 6,160 residents in Asquith. 50.1% of people were born in Australia. The next most common countries of birth were India 7.8%, China 7.5% and Philippines 3.4%. 52.8% of the residents spoke only English at home. Other languages spoken at home included Mandarin at 9.3%. The most common responses for religious affiliation were No Religion 36.5%, Catholic 18.0% and Hinduism 11.1%.

== Education ==
Asquith is home to Asquith Public School, located in Dudley Street, which opened in 1930. St Patrick's Catholic school, on Royston Parade, opened in 1958.

Asquith also has two state high schools: Asquith High School, established 1959, on Stokes Avenue, and Hornsby High School, established 1960, located on the Jersey Street.

== Transport ==
Asquith railway station is on the T9 Northern and T1 North Shore and Central Coast & Newcastle Lines. Hornsby Maintenance Depot is located within the suburb. CDC NSW bus route 592, 595, 597 and 598 to and from Hornsby railway station serves Asquith.

The Pacific Highway passes through Asquith.

== Sport ==
- Asquith Bowling and Recreational Club was established in 1950 and is located in Lodge Street Hornsby, next door to Storey Park. The club has three greens for its bowling members.
- Asquith Cricket Club currently plays in the Hornsby Kuring gai and Hills District Cricket Association Competition. Its home ground is Storey Park in Lodge Street Hornsby. The club has enjoyed excellent success in the A Grade competition by winning six consecutive premierships during the Summer seasons of 2005/06, 06/07, 07/08, 08/09, 09/10, 10/11. The team again made the Grand Final in the season of 2011/12 before losing to West Pennant Hills. The club caters for juniors to adults.
- Asquith Golf Club was officially opened on 18 June 1938. Its layout has changed over the years and currently is a Par 70 layout. It has enjoyed great success within competitions run by the NSW Golf Association. The club has won the Male Junior Pennant in 1964, the Male Eric Apperley Shield U23 in 1969, 74, 75, and the Mixed Pennant Competition in 1988,89,90,91,97,11.
- Asquith Magpies Rugby league club was formed in 1953. The club's home ground is at Storey Park in Lodge Street Hornsby, with the club situated in Alexandria Parade Waitara. The Club caters for players from Under 6 to All Age. The club's Under 6's to Under 12's compete in the North Sydney Junior Rugby League competition. The club's Under 13's to Under 19's, plus their A-grade team compete in the combined North Sydney-Manly Junior Rugby League competition. Asquith also fields teams in the Ron Massey Cup and Sydney Shield, where they serve as a feeder club to the North Sydney Bears New South Wales Cup team.
- Asquith Soccer club was formed in 1969. Its home ground is Asquith Park in Mills Avenue, Asquith. The First Grade team won its first major trophy in the Kuring gai District Soccer Association by taking out the KDSA Cup in 1979. Since then the First Grade team has won the Premier League title a total of six times including a Soccer District record of five consecutively. This being in 2002,03,04,05,06 and then a sixth title in 2009. The club caters for players from Under 6 to All Age.
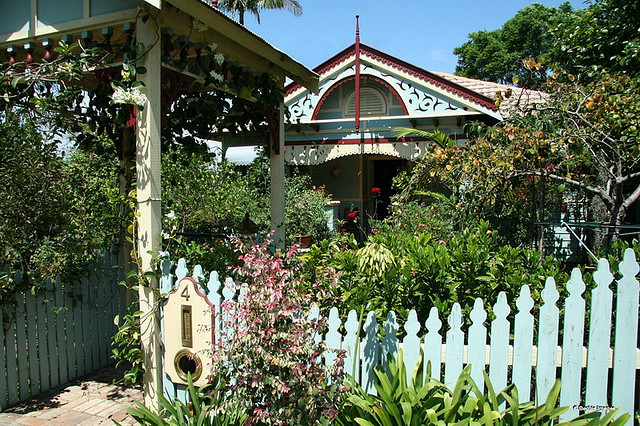
An original residential home on Baldwin Avenue, Asquith

== Notable residents ==
- Graham Bidstrup, Member of The Angels
- Aaron Chen, Comedian
- Nagi Maehashi, founder of RecipeTin Eats

== See also ==
- Ku-ring-gai Chase National Park
