= Asquith High School =

Location
- Stokes Avenue, Asquith, New South Wales; Australia; 33°41′27.14″S 151°6′46.94″E

Information
- Type: Government-funded comprehensive single-sex secondary day school
- Motto: Learn to live
- Established: January 1947; 79 years ago (as Hornsby Home Science School); 1 January 1959; 67 years ago (as Asquith Girls High School)
- School district: Hornsby
- Educational authority: New South Wales Department of Education
- Oversight: NSW Education Standards Authority
- Principal: Elizabeth Amvrazis
- Teaching staff: 45.6 FTE (2018)
- Years: 7–12
- Gender: All
- Enrolment: 597 (2023)
- Campus: Suburban
- Colours: Green and white
- Website: asquith-h.schools.nsw.gov.au

Asquith High School (abbreviated as AHS and formerly known as Asquith Girls High School) is a government-funded comprehensive co-education secondary day school located on Stokes Avenue, Asquith, an upper north shore suburb of Sydney, New South Wales, Australia.

Established in 1959 to replace the Hornsby Home Science School, the school enrolled approximately 597 students in 2018, from Year 7 to Year 12, of whom two percent identified as Indigenous Australians and 30 percent were from a language background other than English. The school is operated by the NSW Department of Education in accordance with a curriculum developed by the New South Wales Education Standards Authority; the principal is Elizabeth Amvrazis.

== History ==
In February 1958, the NSW Department of Education acquired a two-hectare (five-acre) site in eastern Asquith for a new girls high school to replace the Hornsby Home Science School (established 1947) that was destroyed with other school buildings on Peats Ferry Road in a bushfire in 1957. Asquith Girls High School officially commenced operation from 1 January 1959.

As of 2026, the school is co-ed and has been renamed to Asquith High School. Its former sister school, Asquith Boys High School, became co-ed in the same year and was renamed to Hornsby High School.

== Principals ==
The following individuals have served as principal of Asquith High School:

Ordinal	Officeholder	Term start	Term end	Time in office	Notes
−	Alma Hamilton				
−	Kristine Needham		2006		
−	Jane Ferris	2006	2013	6–7 years	
−	Elizabeth Amvrazis	2013	incumbent	12–13 years	

== Notable alumnae ==
- Micky Green – pop singer

== See also ==
- List of government schools in New South Wales
- Education in Australia
