= Hornsby High School =

High school in New South Wales, Australia

Location
- Jersey Street; Asquith, New South Wales; Australia; 33°41′30″S 151°6′17″E

Information
- Type: Government-funded comprehensive co-educational secondary day school
- Motto: Grow in Wisdom
- Established: January 2026; 10 months ago
- School district: Hornsby
- Educational authority: New South Wales Department of Education
- Oversight: NSW Education Standards Authority
- Principal: Bryce Grant
- Teaching staff: 48.6 FTE (2026)
- Years: 7–12
- Gender: Co-educational
- Enrolment: 542 (2026)
- Campus: Suburban
- Colours: Dark Blue and Light Blue
- Website: hornsby-h.schools.nsw.gov.au

Hornsby High School (formerly Asquith Boys High School) is a government-funded comprehensive coeducational secondary day school, located on Jersey Street, Asquith, an upper north shore suburb of Sydney, New South Wales, Australia.

Established in 1960, the school enrolled approximately 520 students in 2023, from Year 7 to Year 12, of whom three percent identified as Indigenous Australians and 19 percent were from a language background other than English. The school is operated by the NSW Department of Education in accordance with a curriculum developed by the New South Wales Education Standards Authority; the principal is Bryce Grant.

== History ==
The school was established as a boys school named Asquith Boys High School. The site on which the school was built was originally a citrus orchard owned by the Fear family, a Hornsby pioneer family. The original name "Asquith" from which the suburb north of Hornsby, and subsequently the school, takes its name, was named in 1915 after the wartime Prime Minister of the United Kingdom, H. H. Asquith, who was later made the Earl of Oxford and Asquith. Before the land was acquired by the New South Wales Government in the 1950s, the land had become a cattle and horse paddock. Originally intended to be the site of the Hornsby Technical College, the Department of Education later decided to build Asquith Boys on its current site instead.

Construction of the school buildings began in late 1959 but it was realised that they would not be finished in time for the school's opening in 1960 and thus the half the first cohort of students were housed in various sites around Hornsby while the other half were housed in Chatswood High School. By mid-1960, the A Block was complete and the school moved onto its present site on 24 June 1960. By 1961 the school had risen in size to 660 students, which was later to rise to 990 by 1962, and 30 teachers while E Block and the Assembly Hall were also completed. The first principal was Mervyn Brown, who contributed to establishing school traditions by composing the school song "Grow in Wisdom".

By the time the first prefects and captains were elected in 1964, the school had risen in size to 1073 students and 54 teachers. The school was officially opened on 7 August 1964 by the director-general of secondary education, A.W. Stephens. By 1965 the science, arts and music rooms in G Block had been completed. The cadet unit was also formed in 1967, only to be disbanded again in 1973 following the end of Commonwealth funding for cadet units. The 1970s also saw various changes including an expansion of the Library as well as repairs to E Block following a classroom fire.

Twins Paul Dawson and Chris Dawson were transferred to the school's PE department from Co-educational schools, following allegations. Chris Dawson coached Lloyd Babb in Rugby League.

In 2026, the school became co-ed and was renamed from Asquith Boys High School. The school's former sister school, Asquith Girls High School, became co-ed in the same year and was renamed to Asquith High School.

== Notable alumni ==
- Daniel Arnamnart – swimmer
- Lloyd Babb SC – NSW Director of Public Prosecutions
- George Blackwood – soccer player; played for Adelaide United
- Kim Carpenter AM – visual artist, theatre director
- Justin Han – table tennis player
- John Hartigan AO – journalist and media executive
- Rolf de Heer – film director
- Robbie Hooker – soccer player and coach
- Leroy Houston – rugby union player
- Mike Kelly AM, MP – politician; former Australian Army lawyer and Member for Eden-Monaro
- Greg Lindsay AO – think tank executive
- Gary McKay MC – writer and former Australian Army officer
- Bruce Miller AO – former Australian Ambassador to Japan
- Andrew Sayers AM – director of the National Museum of Australia
- Jordan Smylie – soccer player; played for the Central Coast Mariners
- Kim Sterelny – professor of philosophy
- Russell Trood – former Liberal Party Senator for the state of Queensland

== See also ==
- List of government schools in New South Wales
- Education in Australia
