= Pindar Cave =

Cave in New South Wales, Australia

Coordinates: 33.49316°S 151.22291°E

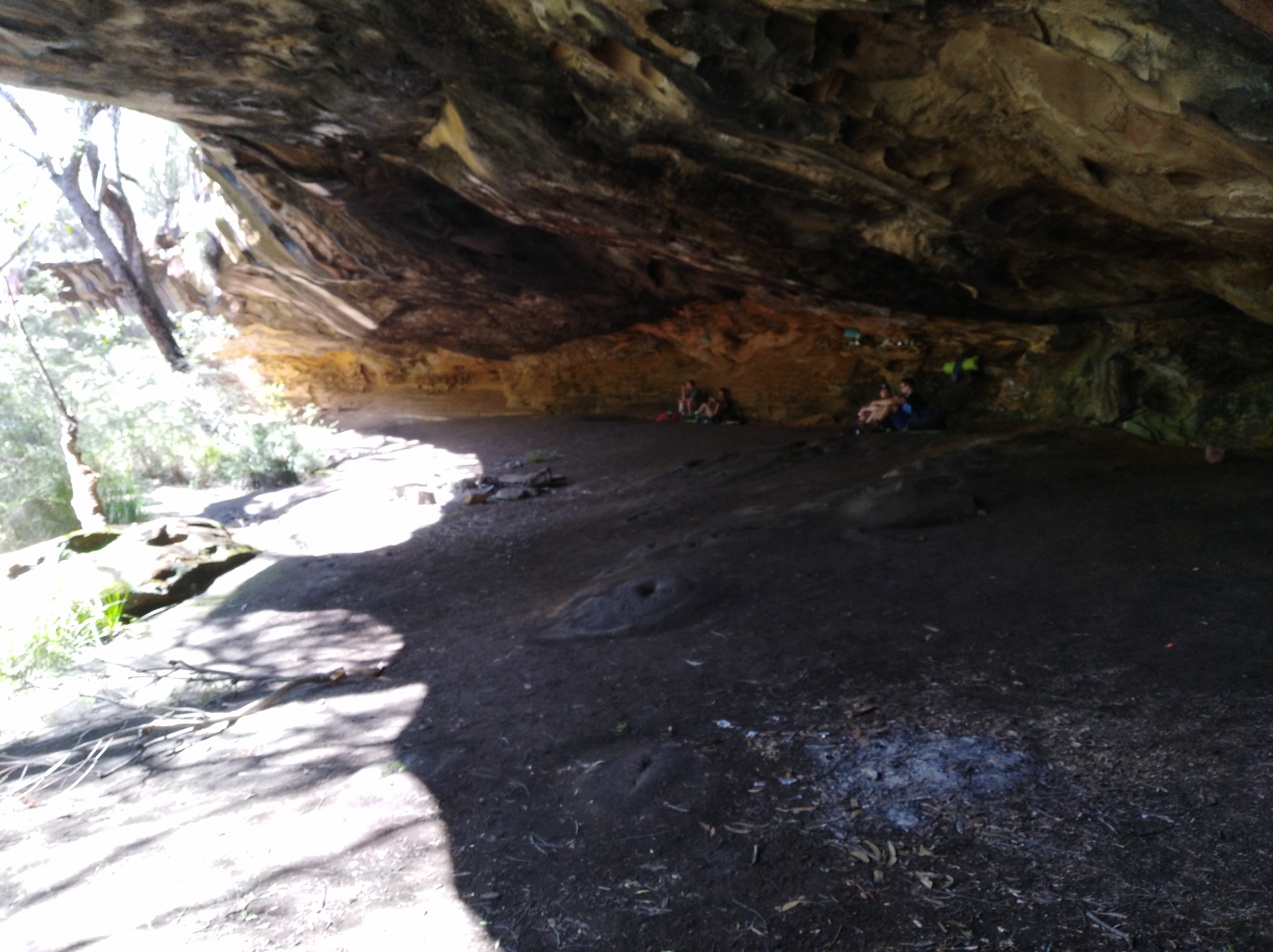
Pindar Cave, 5 September 2020

Pindar Cave is a geological formation which appears as a massive concave of overhanging sandstone rock. It is located west of Woy Woy which is north of Sydney, Australia in Brisbane Water National Park.

Although it is named as a cave, the whole formation is an overhang. It is large enough for sixty walkers to camp overnight under its shelter away from wet weather.

== Location ==
Pindar is situated in the midst of a plateau peninsula of heath and moderate dry sclerophyll forest. The south end of the peninsula ends at the Hawkesbury River. Pindar is northwest of the north shore of the Hawkesbury River Railway Bridge north of Brooklyn. To the east of the peninsula is Mullet Creek and to the west is Mooney Mooney Creek. Both Mullet and Mooney Creeks are large drowned valleys formed at the end of the last ice ages when the waters of the world's oceans rose substantially.

== Access ==
=== Rail ===
From Sydney there is only one practical access, which is by the Central Coast & Newcastle Line Intercity train that travels from Central Station to Newcastle, stopping at Wondabyne, which is north east from Pindar. There are no roads at Wondabyne, the backdrop escarpment is too precipitous.

== See also ==
- List of caves in New South Wales
