= List of caves in New South Wales =

This is a list of caves and cave systems in the state of New South Wales, Australia.

== Caves ==
- Abercrombie Caves
- Ashford Caves
- Bendethera Caves
- Billys Creek Caves
- Borenore Caves
- Bungonia Caves
- Careys Cave
- Church Creek Caves
- Colong Caves
- Finchs Caves
- Jenolan Caves (List of caves within the Jenolan Caves karst)
- St Michaels Cave (Avalon Beach)
- Mermaids Cave
- Timor Caves
- Tuglow Caves
- Wee Jasper Caves
- Wellington Caves
- Willie Willie Caves
- Wombeyan Caves
- Wyanbene Caves
- Yarrangobilly Caves

== See also ==
- List of caves in Australia
