= Central Coast & Newcastle Line =

Australian railway service

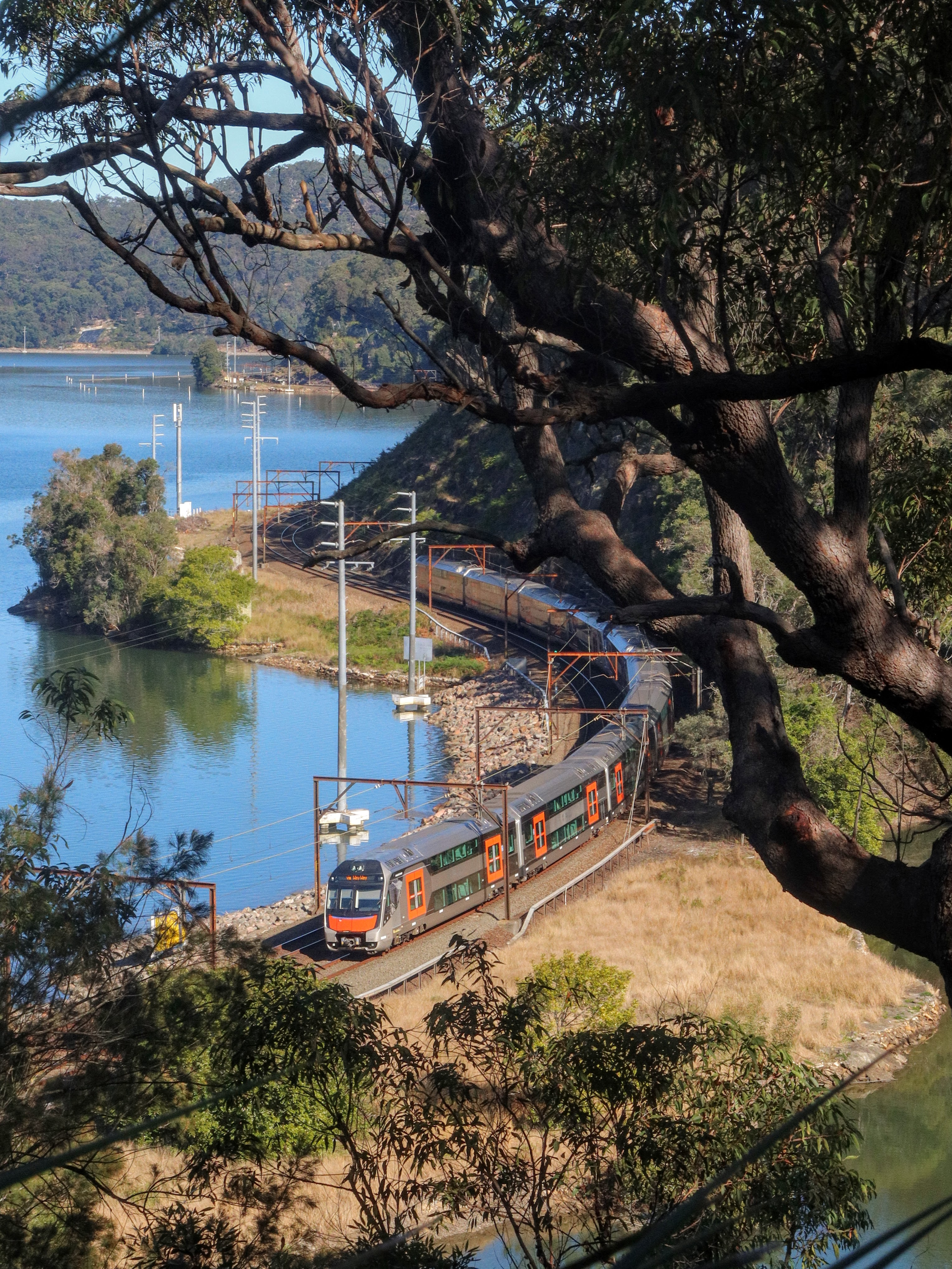
- A D set travelling to Newcastle, running alongside the Mullet Creek, Brisbane Water National Park

Overview
- Service type: Intercity rail
- Locale: Central Coast; Newcastle in the Hunter Region; Lake Macquarie
- Current operator: Sydney Trains

Route
- Termini: Central; Newcastle Interchange
- Stops: 36
- Distance travelled: 165.60 km (102.90 mi)
- Lines used: Main North railway line Newcastle railway line North Shore railway line

Technical
- Rolling stock: D set H set (peak hours between Sydney and Wyong only)
- Track gauge: 1,435 mm (4 ft 8 1/2 in) standard gauge
- Electrification: 1,500 V DC from overhead catenary
- Track owner: Transport Asset Manager of New South Wales
- Timetable number: CCN
Route map
Sydney Trains intercity services
- Blue Mountains
- Central Coast & Newcastle
- Hunter
- South Coast
- Southern Highlands

The Central Coast & Newcastle Line (CCN) is an intercity rail service that services the Central Coast region, Newcastle in the Hunter region and Lake Macquarie. It connects the two largest cities in New South Wales, running from Central in Sydney along the Main North railway line to Broadmeadow, and to Newcastle Interchange in Newcastle on the Newcastle railway line.

== Description of route ==
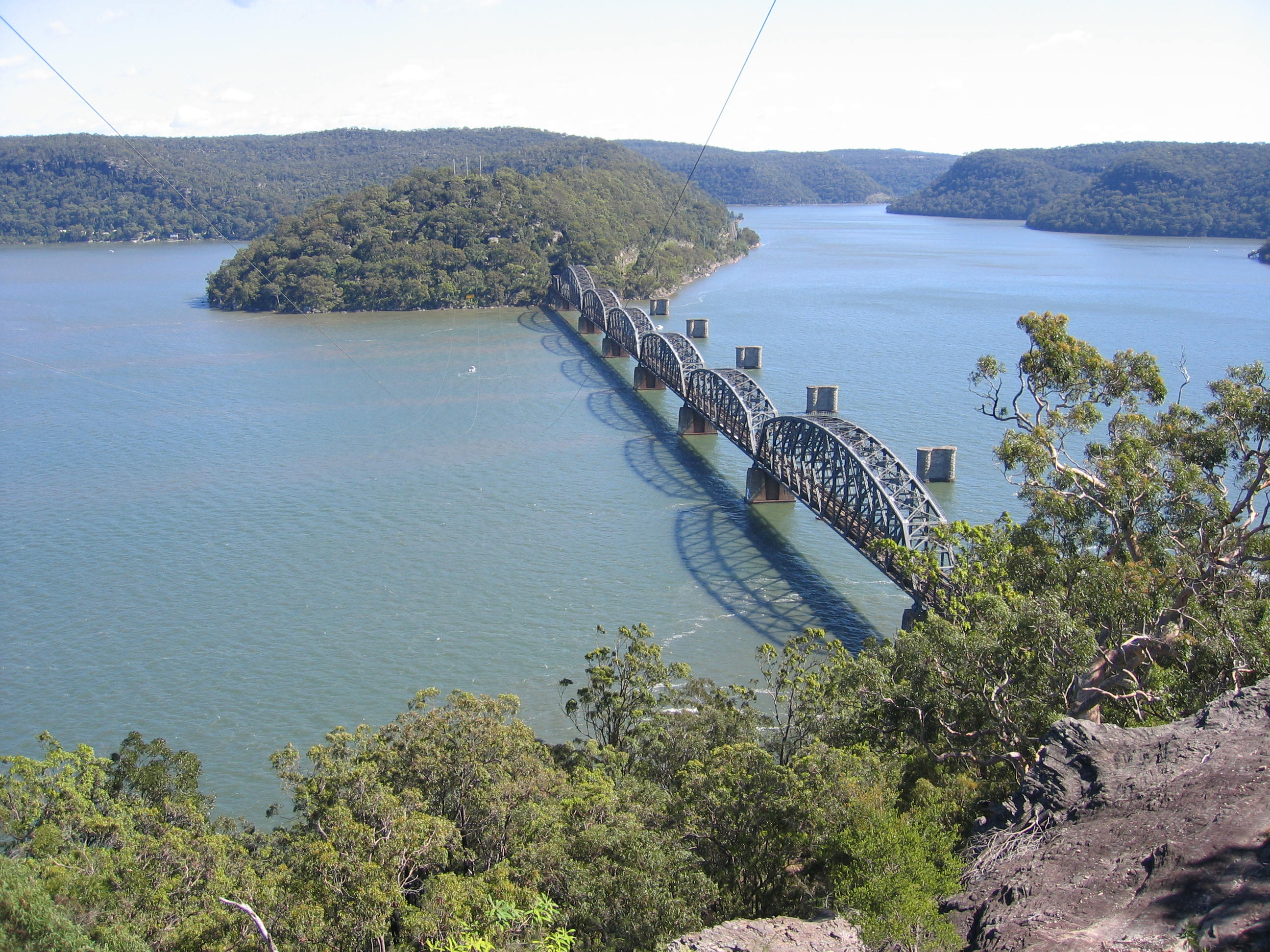
The Hawkesbury River separates Sydney and the Central Coast. The bridge over the river is one of the major engineering structures on the line.

The route traverses the Main West route until Strathfield, where it diverts north and follows the route of the Main North line until Broadmeadow, before diverting east along the route of the Newcastle branch line. The line is electrified at 1500 volts DC throughout, and is primarily double track, although there are refuge loops at Hawkesbury River, Gosford, Wyong, Awaba, and Sulphide Junction (between Cockle Creek and Cardiff). Some services terminate at Gosford and Wyong.

Services primarily operate to and from Central (Sydney Terminal) via Strathfield. During morning and afternoon peak periods on weekdays, some services will operate in the peak direction from either Wyong or Gosford to Sydney Central via the North Shore Line, then continuing on as a T1 service from the Central suburban platforms to Blacktown.

== History ==
Prior to electrification of the route, steam hauled passenger trains were varied. From November 1929 until April 1988, the Newcastle Flyer operated on the route. From the time the line was electrified, services to Gosford were hauled by 46 class locomotives, their sphere of operation increasing as the wires were extended. After electrification to Newcastle, services were taken over by U and V sets. Later, the U sets were replaced by K and G sets which, in turn,the last electric locomotives were withdrawn in March 1998 with all services operated by electric multiple unit stock.

The section of the Newcastle railway line between Hamilton and Newcastle was closed on 25 December 2014. Until the opening of Newcastle Interchange in 2017, Hamilton served as the temporary northern terminus. The closed section between Wickham and Newcastle was replaced with the Newcastle Light Rail that opened on 17 February 2019.

On 27 June 2025, V sets ceased operations on the Central Coast & Newcastle Line, following the rollout of the D sets.

== Services ==
Services via Strathfield depart from Central (Sydney Terminal) and since June 2025, services consist primarily of D sets, which can run in 4, 8 car formation. Weekday peak hour services via Gordon on the North Shore Line with 8 car H sets between Gosford or Wyong and Sydney Central via the North Shore line and then continues as a T1 suburban service to Blacktown on the Western Line.

As at January 2026, the Central Coast via North Shore peak services are operated by Oscar fleet. Transport for NSW lists the North Shore as a proposed Mariyung fleet line. It is presumed that 8 car variants of the Mariyung will operate on the North Shore due to North Sydney, Wynyard, and Town Hall stations being 8 cars in length and inside tunnels.

== Upgrades ==
=== Completed ===
The line was electrified to Gosford in January 1960, Wyong in April 1982 and Newcastle in June 1984.

As part of the Northern Sydney Freight Corridor project the following projects were completed: The projects were:

Project	Description	Start date	Completion date
North Strathfield underpass	Grade separation for southbound freight trains heading to Flemington	2013	June 2015
Epping to Pennant Hills third track	Third track for northbound trains climbing 1 in 40 grades	2013	Mid-2016
Gosford passing loops	One passing loop in each direction to allow fast trains to overtake slower trains	2013	April 2015

=== Proposed ===
==== Glendale station ====
A railway station is proposed to be constructed in Glendale as part of the Lake Macquarie Transport Interchange project. The station will be located between Cockle Creek and Cardiff railway stations and will have connections to buses. An extension of Glendale Drive leading to the proposed station has been built and completed in June 2017. However, construction of the station has not commenced.

==== New Warnervale station ====
A new station is proposed for Warnervale. The draft Central Coast Transportation Strategy stated that construction of the new railway station was to be completed by 2016. In October 2014 there were some differences between Wyong Council and the State Government over how a strategic piece of land should be developed at Warnervale.

== Rolling stock ==
- New South Wales D set 4 or 8 car EMUs
- New South Wales H set 4 or 8-car EMUs

=== Former ===
- New South Wales V set 4 or 8-car EMUs (22 June 1970 – 27 June 2025)
- Tangara G sets 4 or 8-car EMUs (May 1994 – 2011)
- New South Wales K set 2-car EMUs (1996 – October 2013) (Gosford–Newcastle)
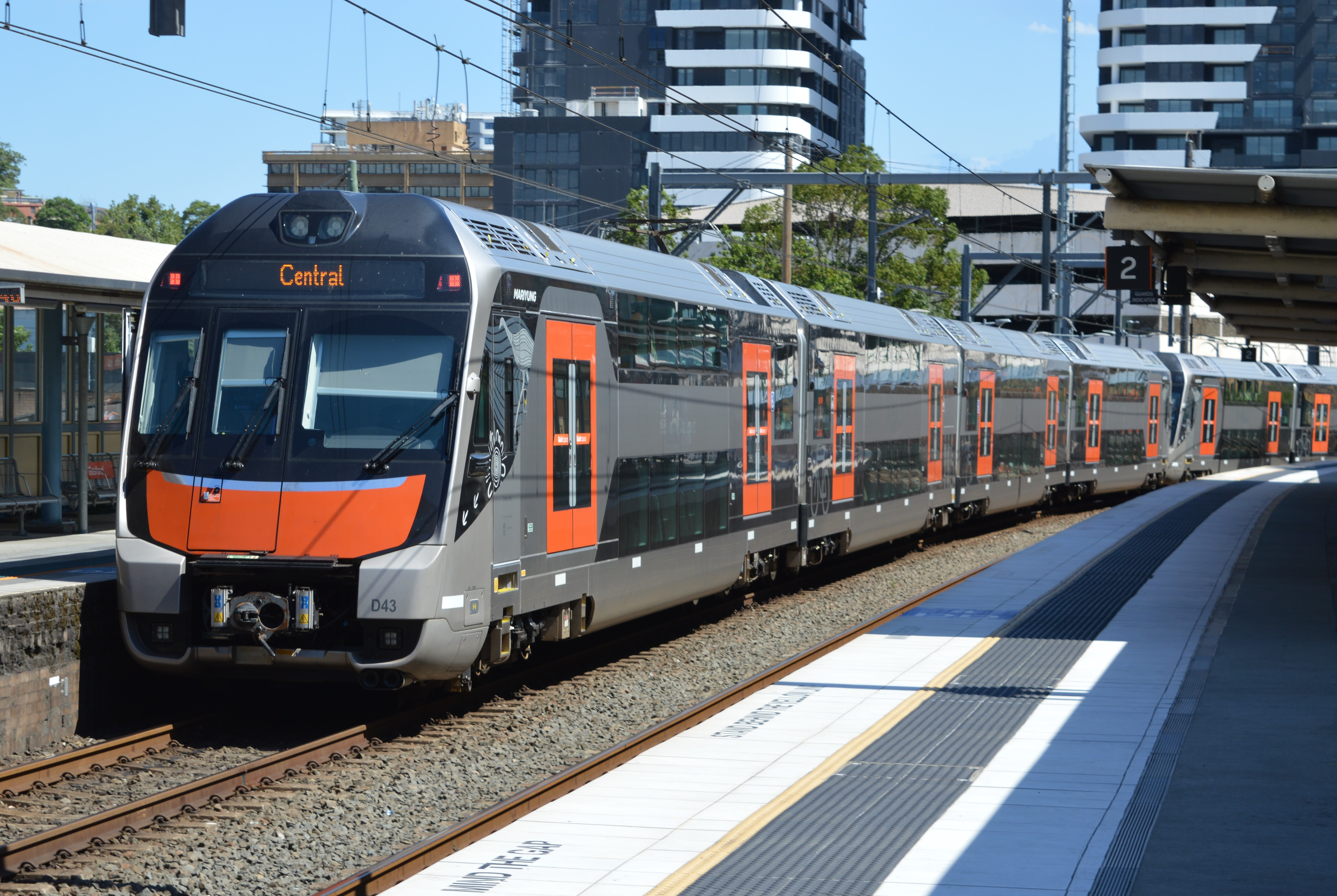
D set

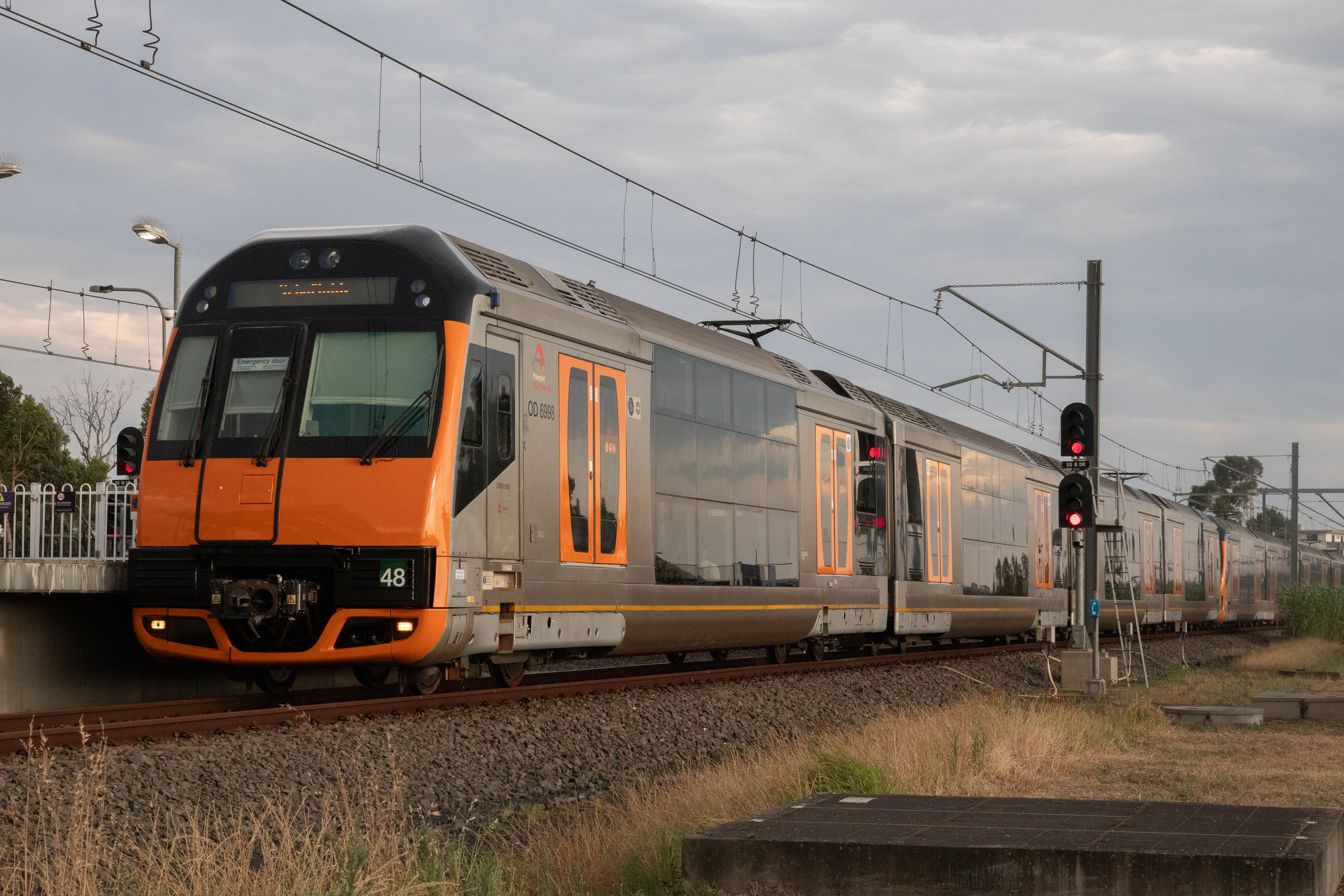
H set

== Central Coast & Newcastle Line Railway Stations ==
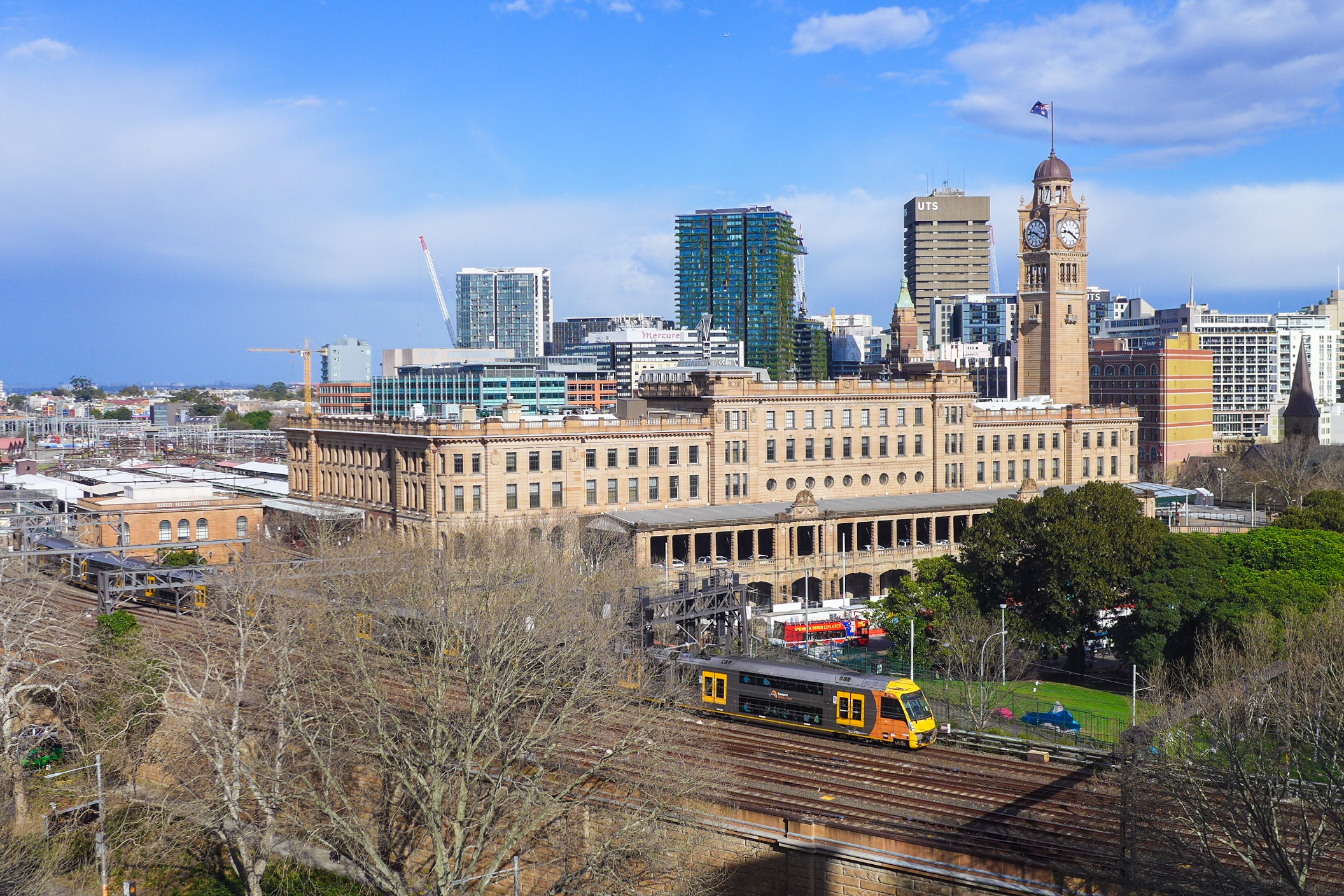
Central

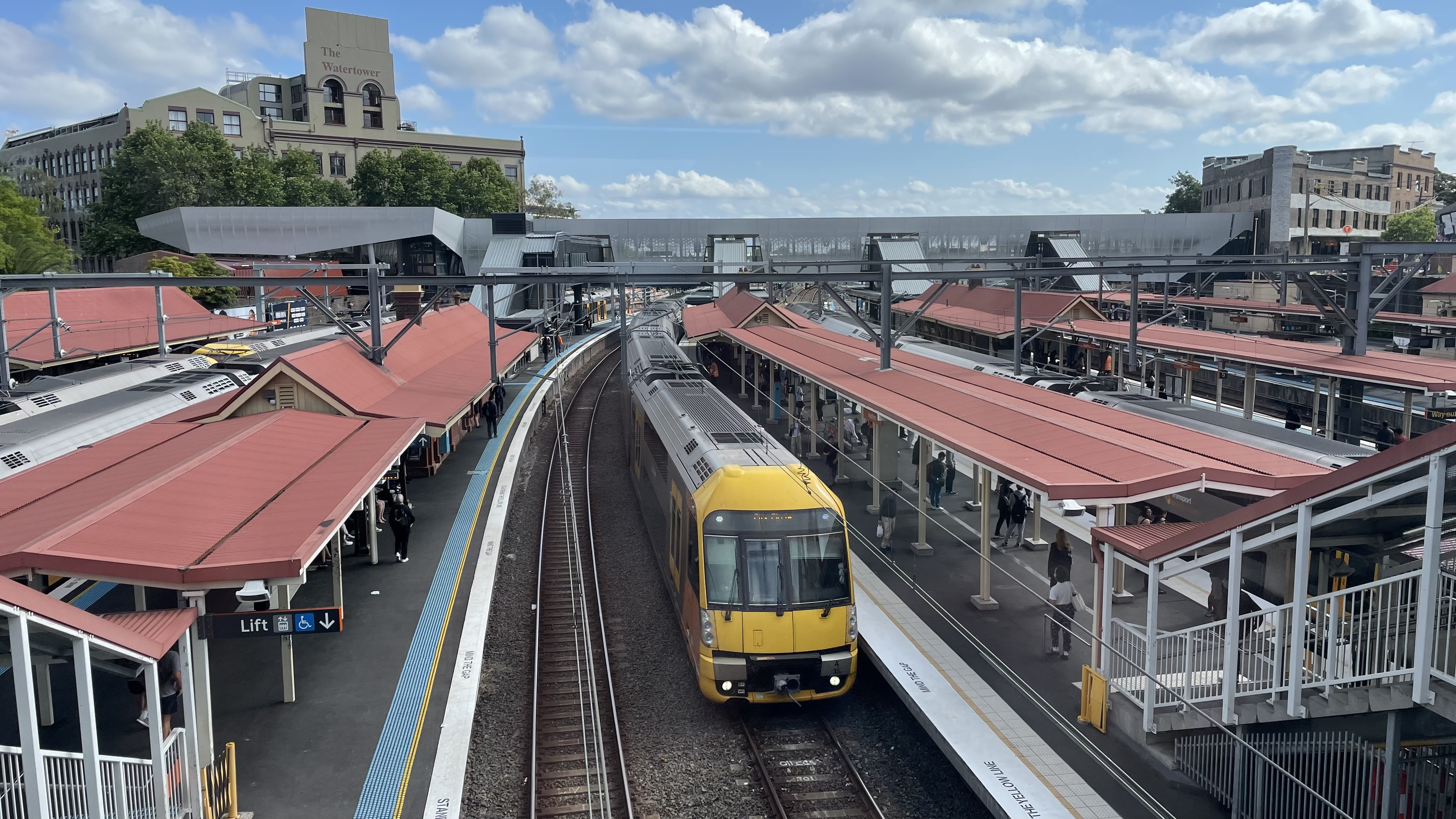
Redfern

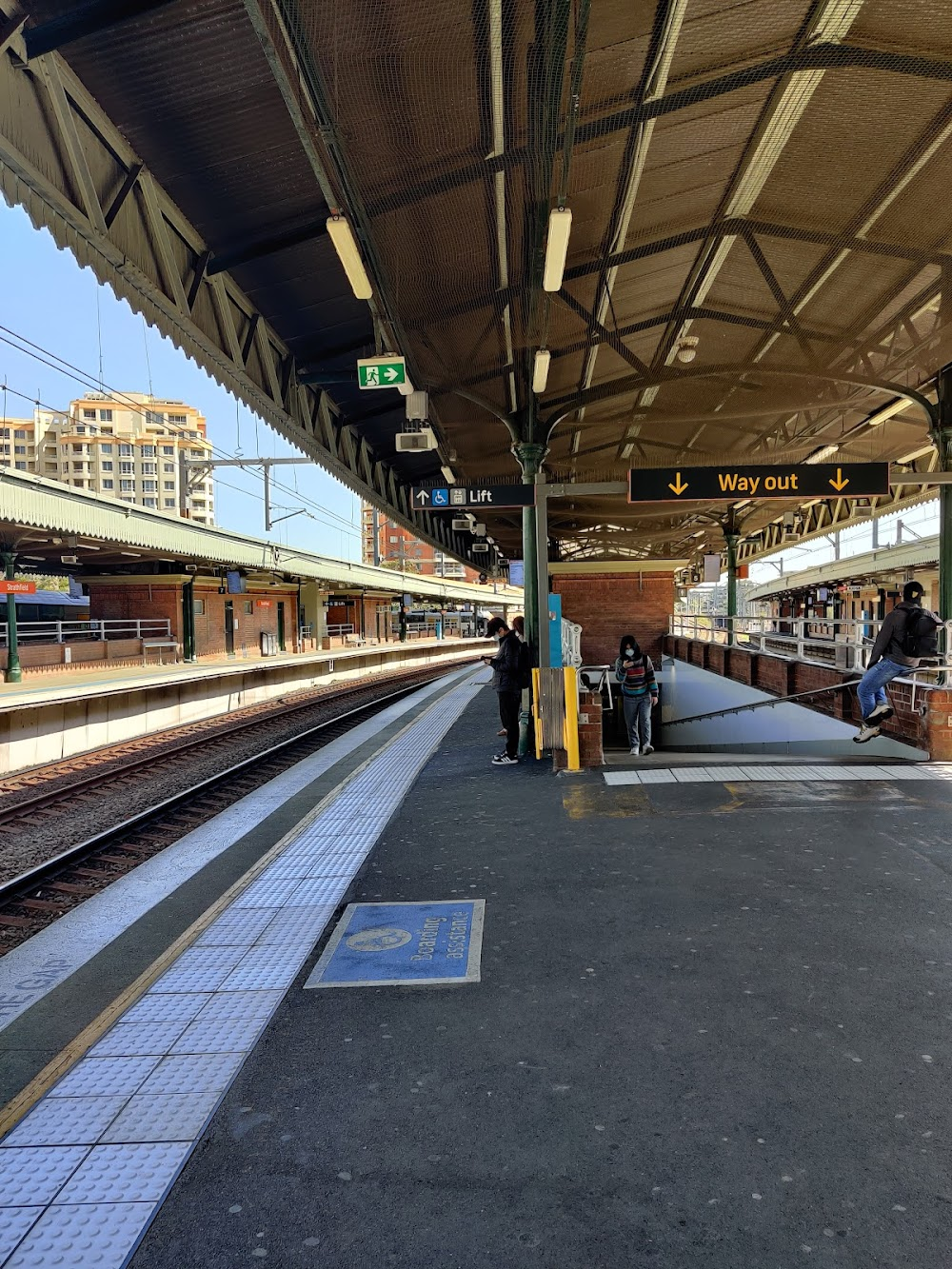
Strathfield

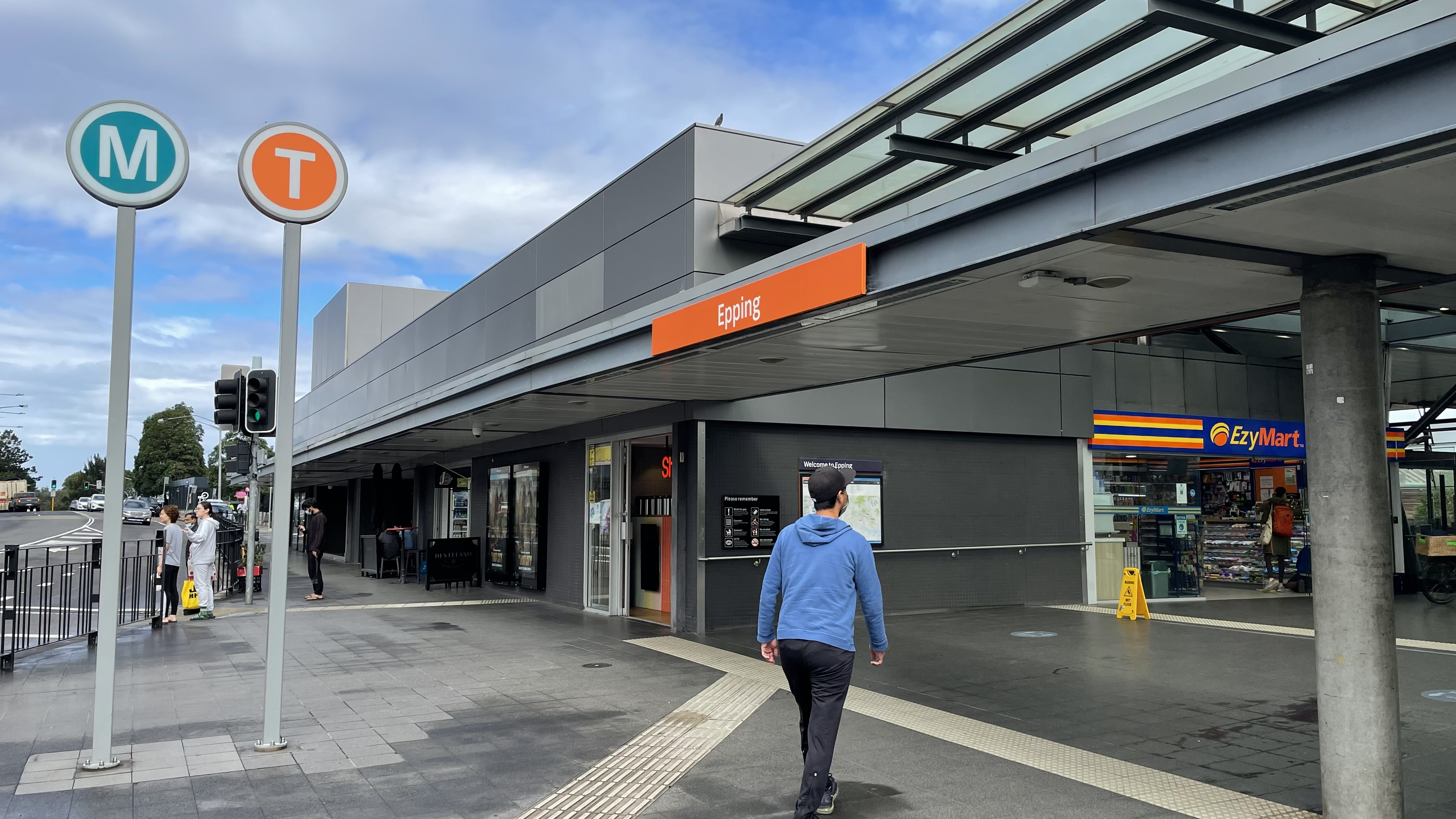
Epping

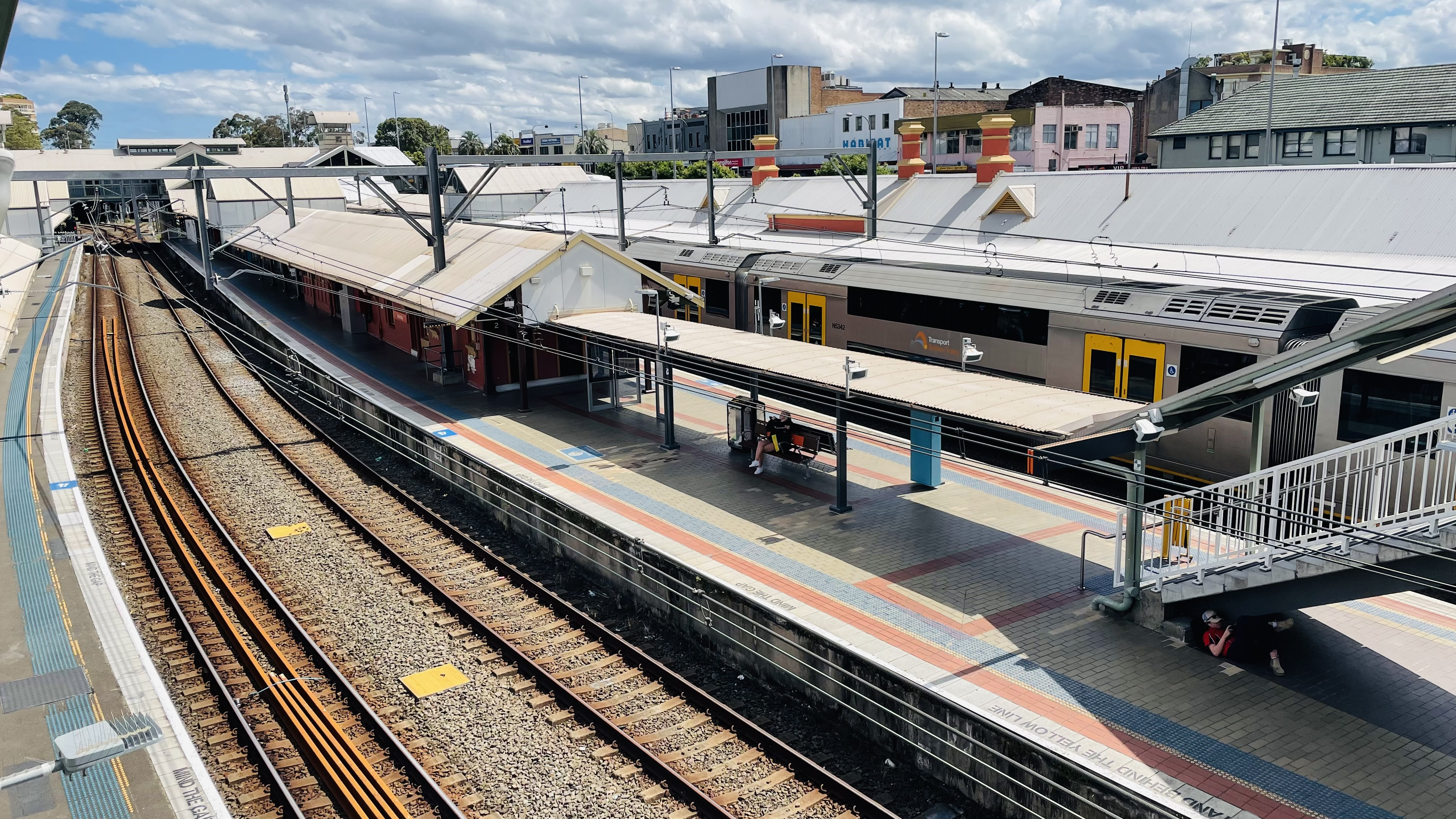
Hornsby

Asquith

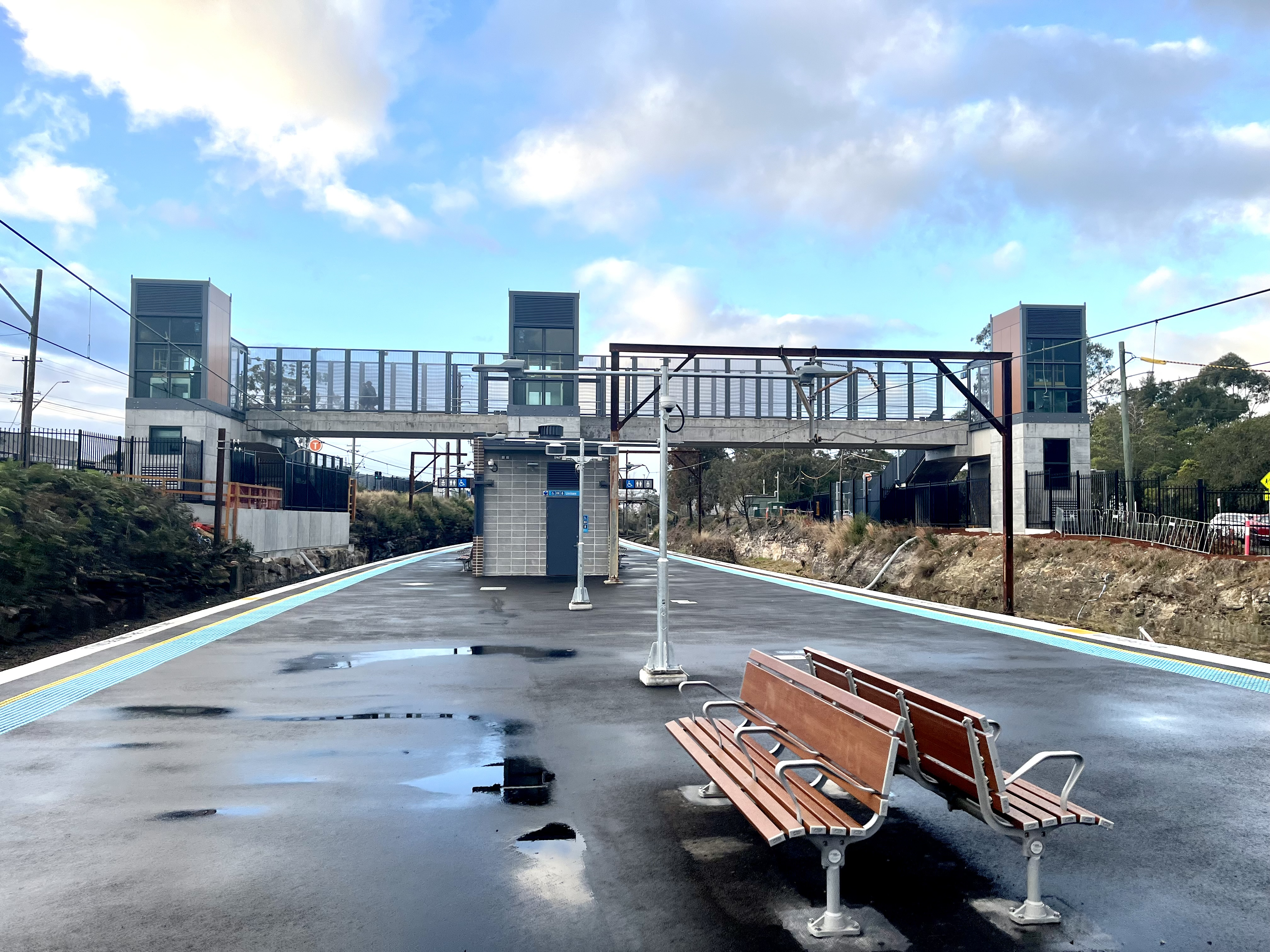
Mount Colah

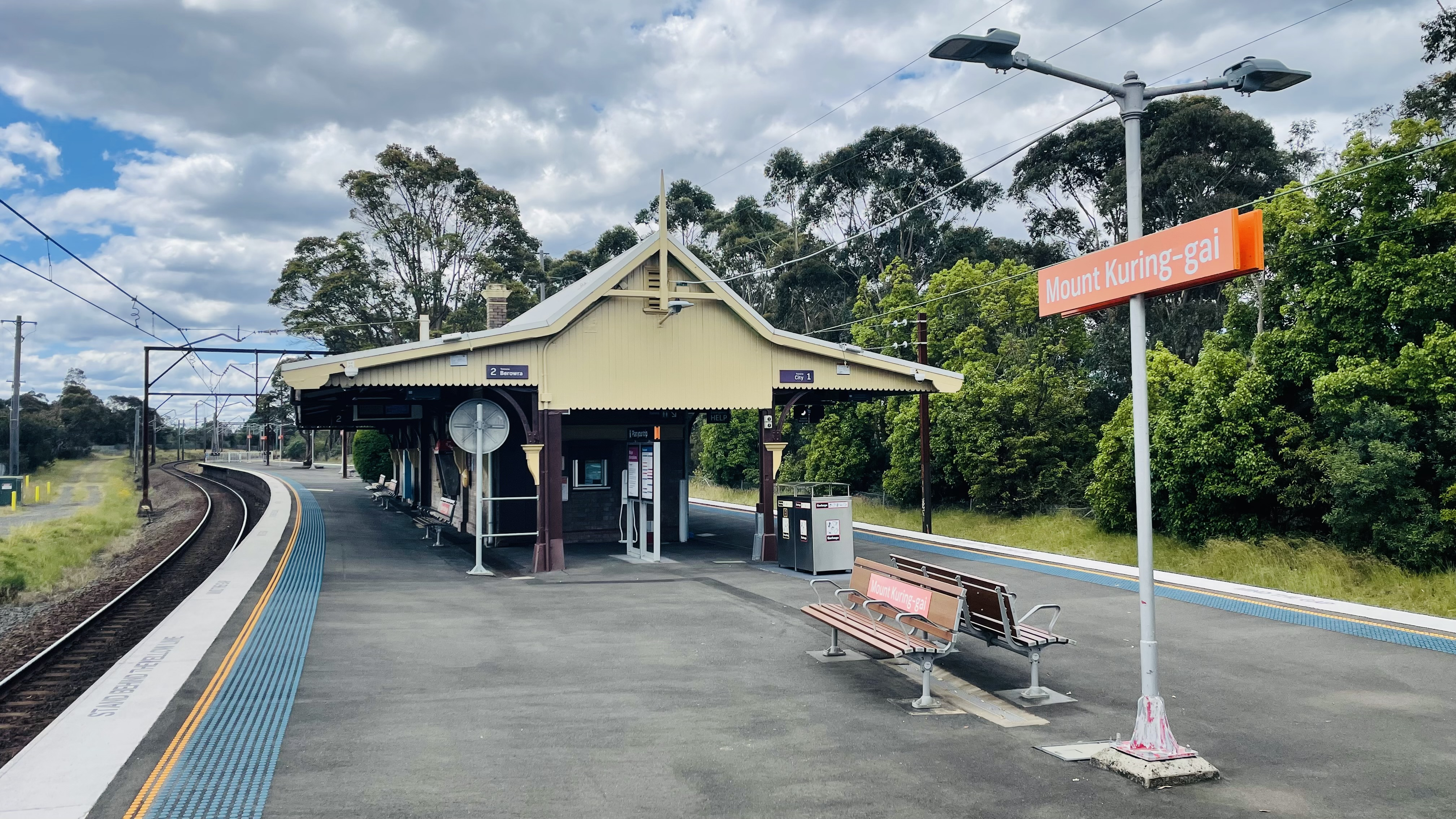
Mount Kuring-gai

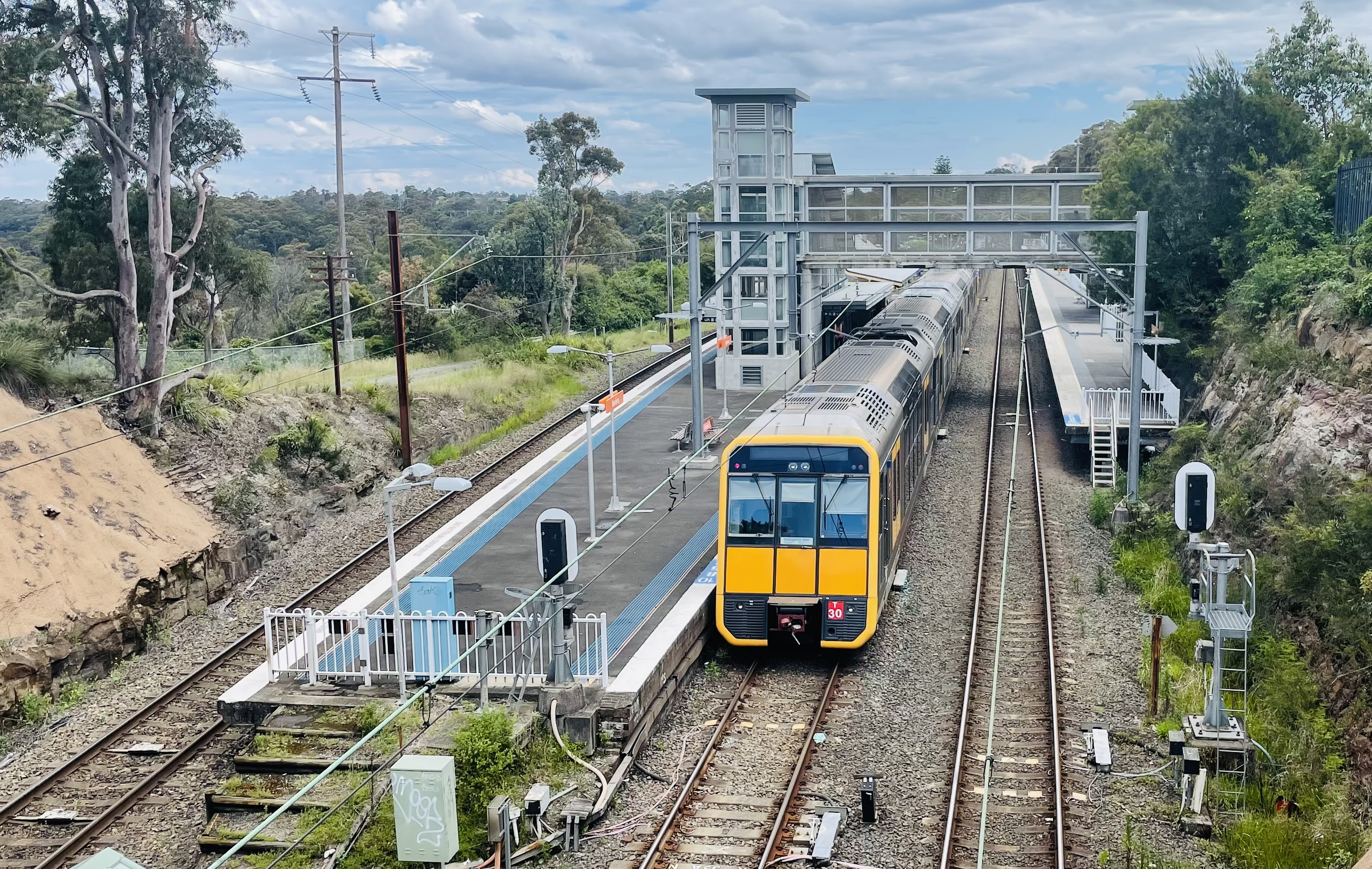
Berowra

Cowan

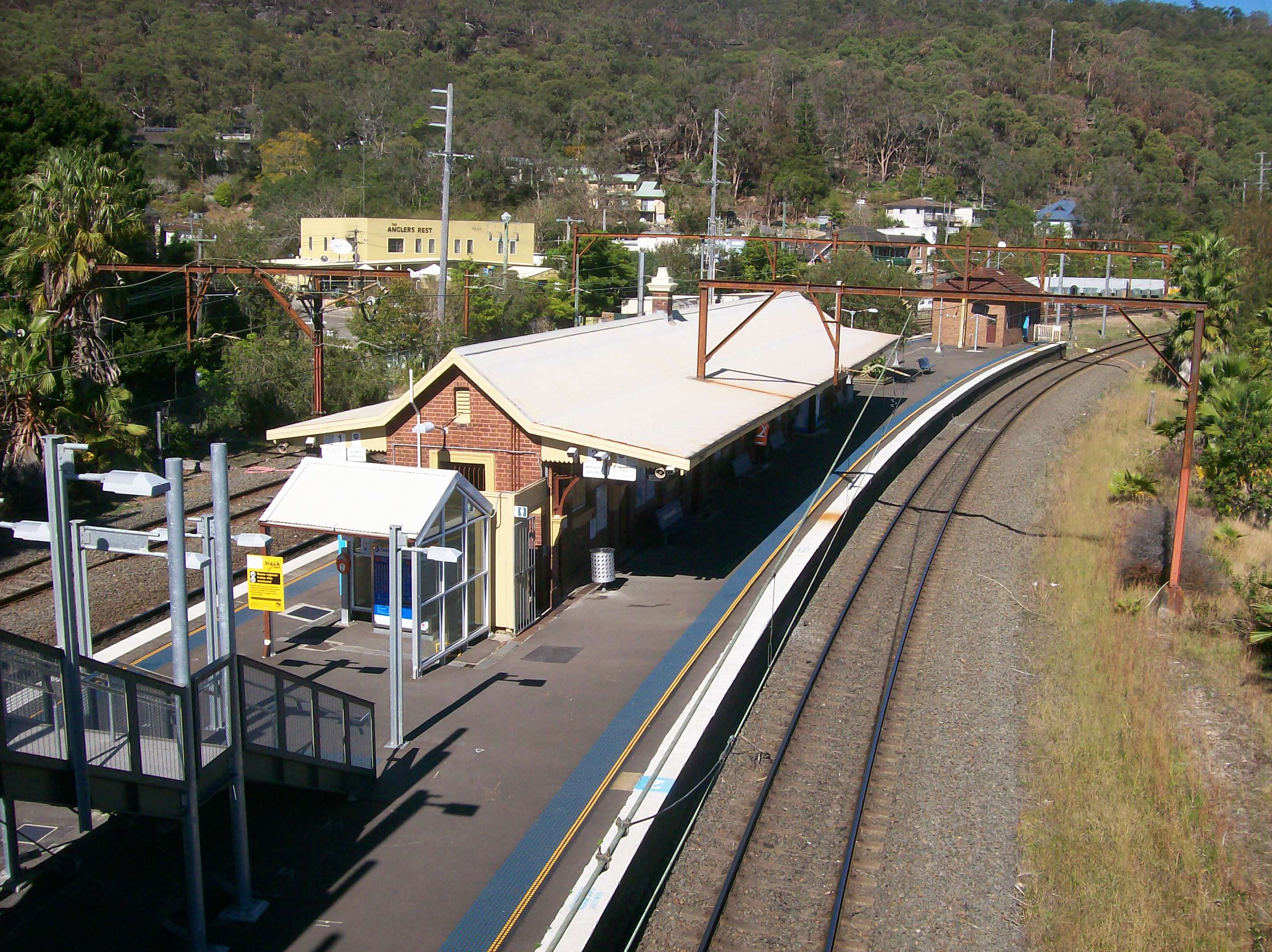
Hawkesbury River

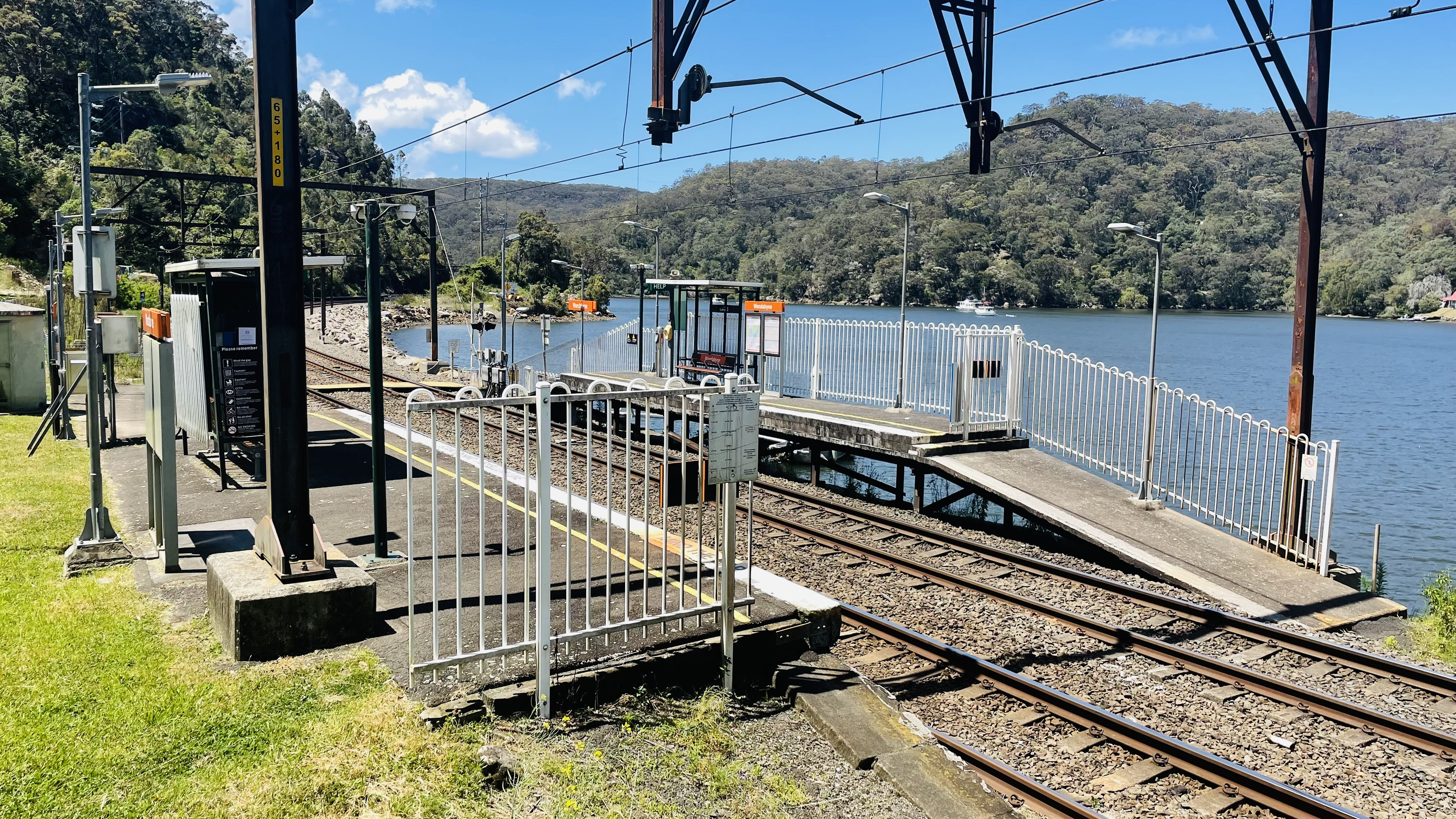
Wondabyne

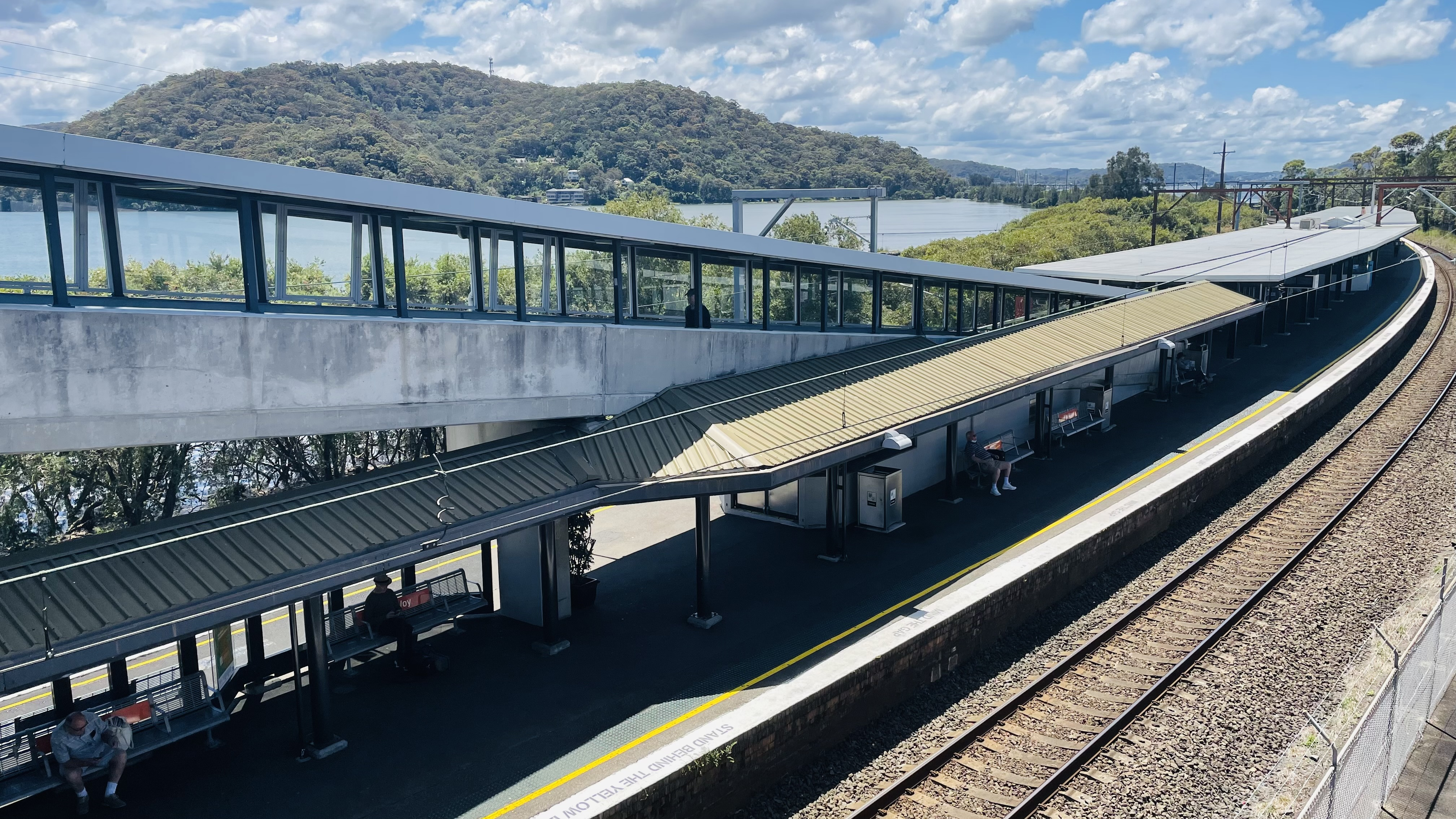
Woy Woy

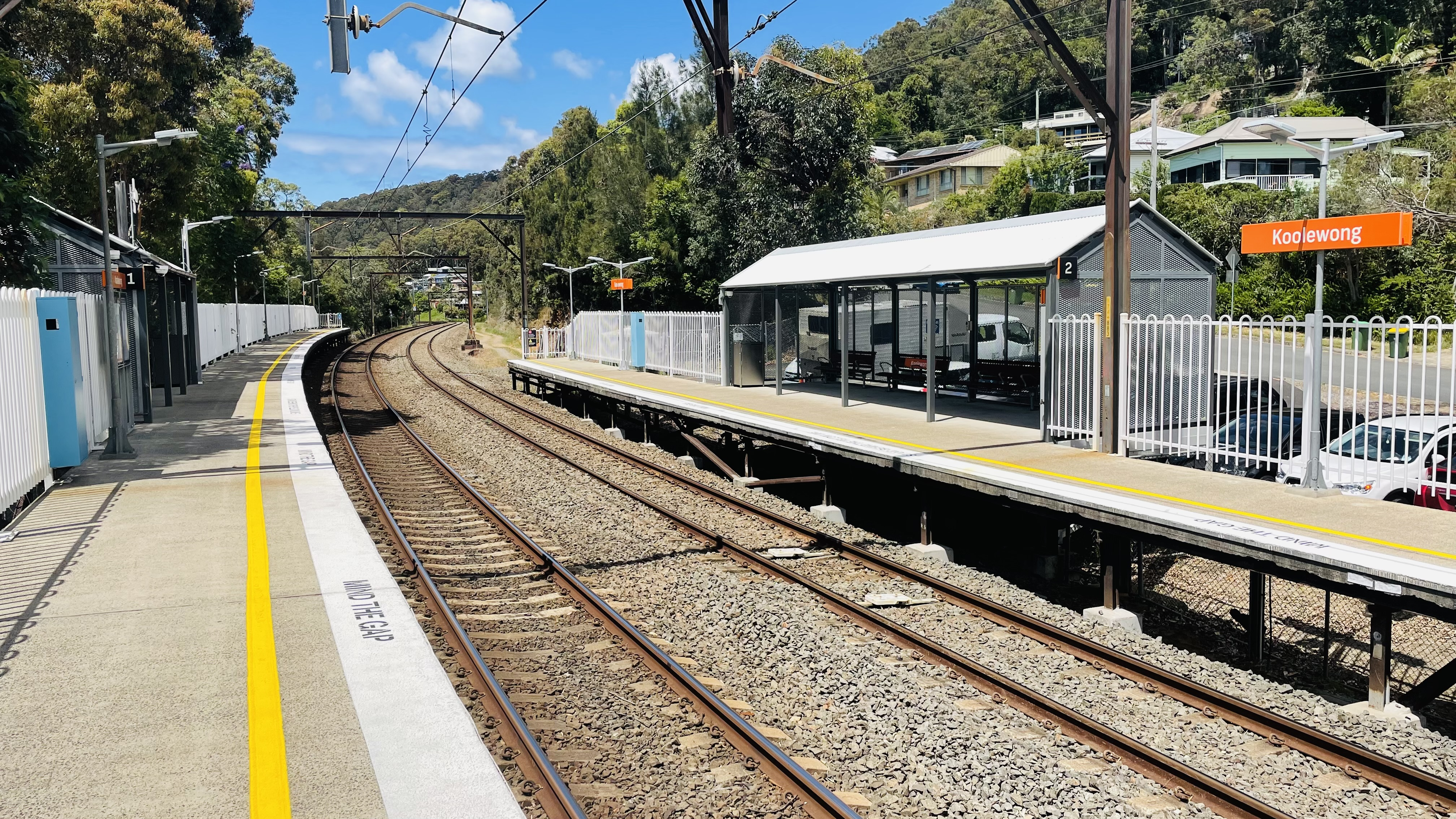
Koolewong

Tascott

Point Clare

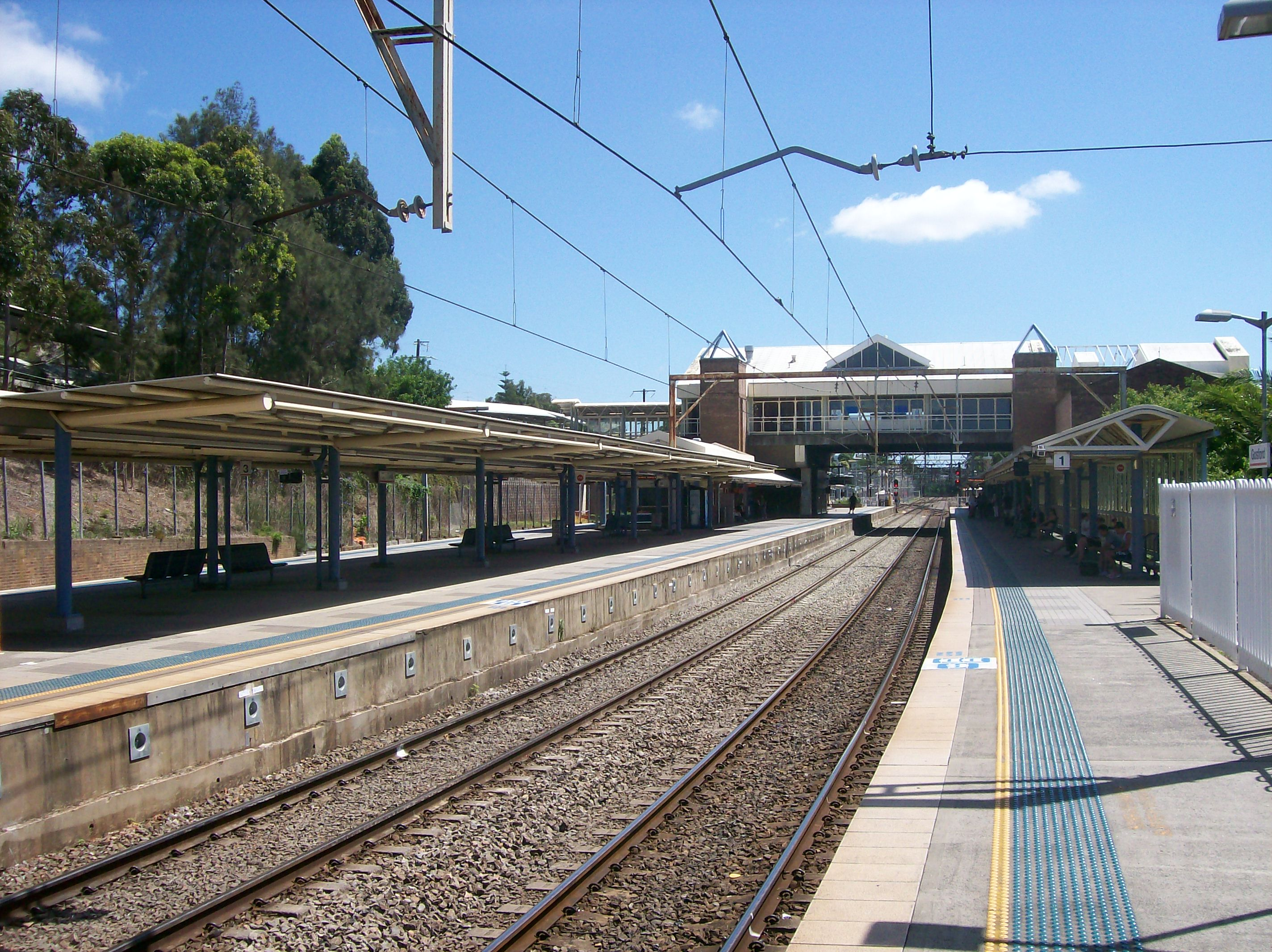
Gosford

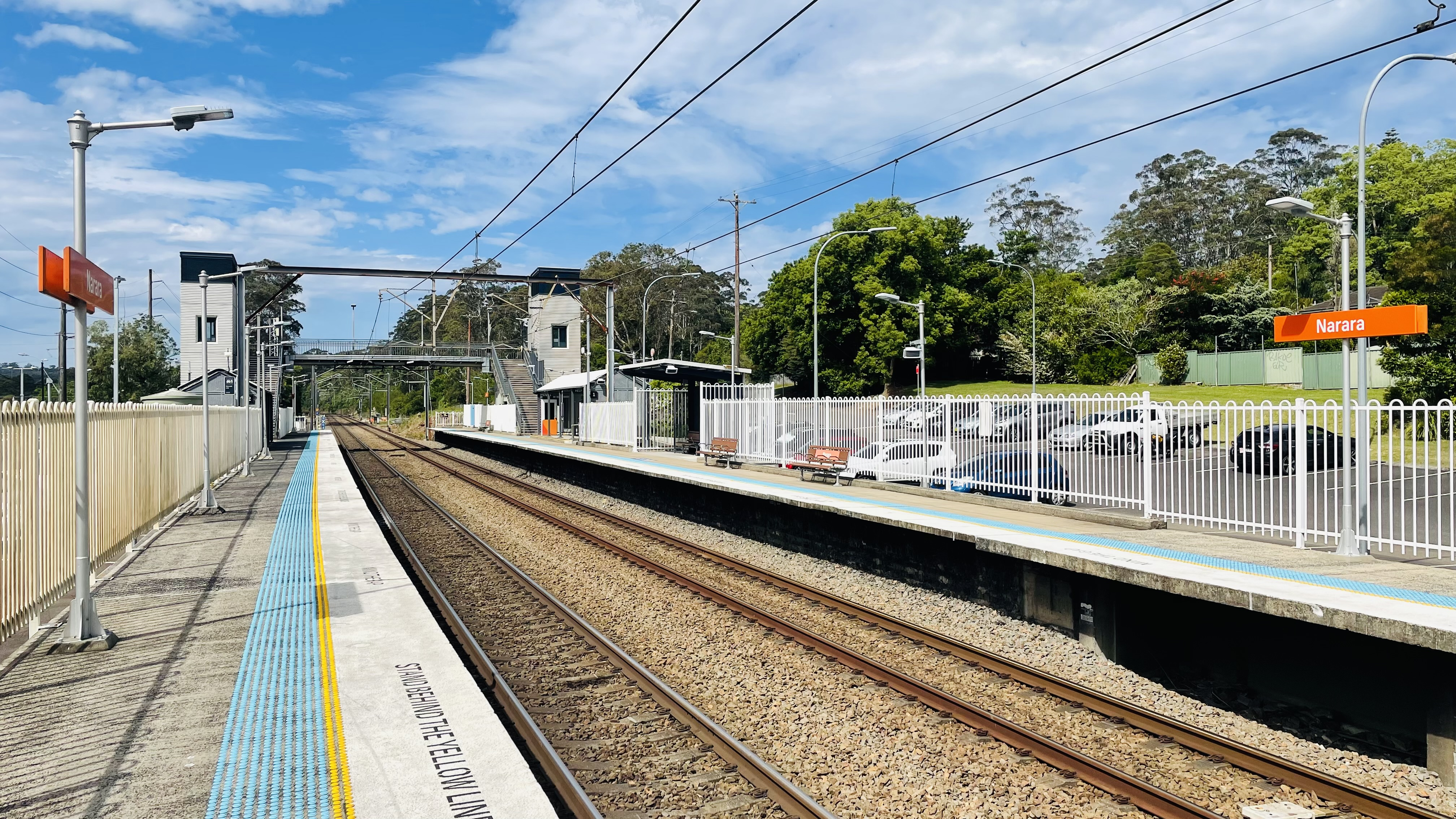
Narara

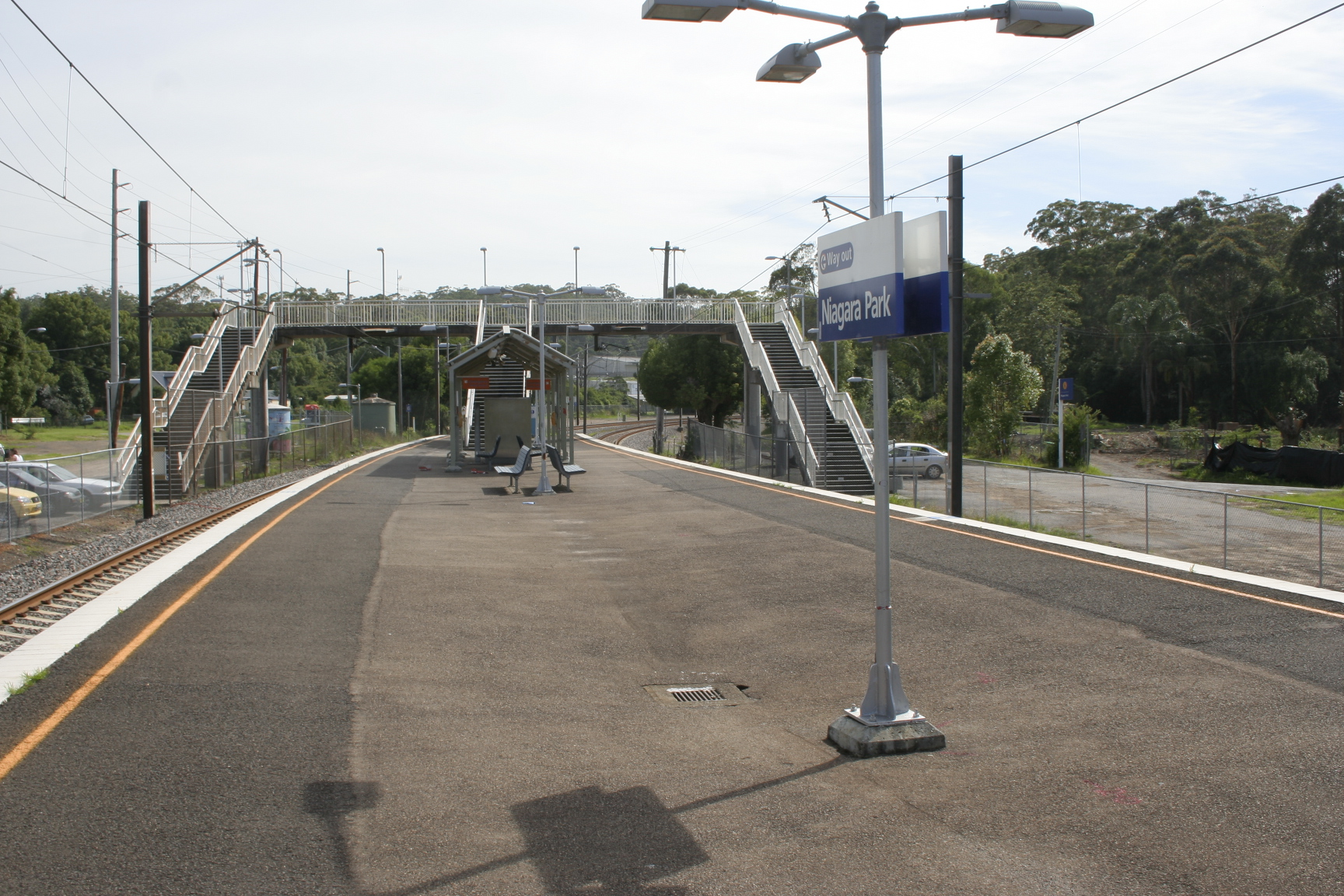
Niagara Park

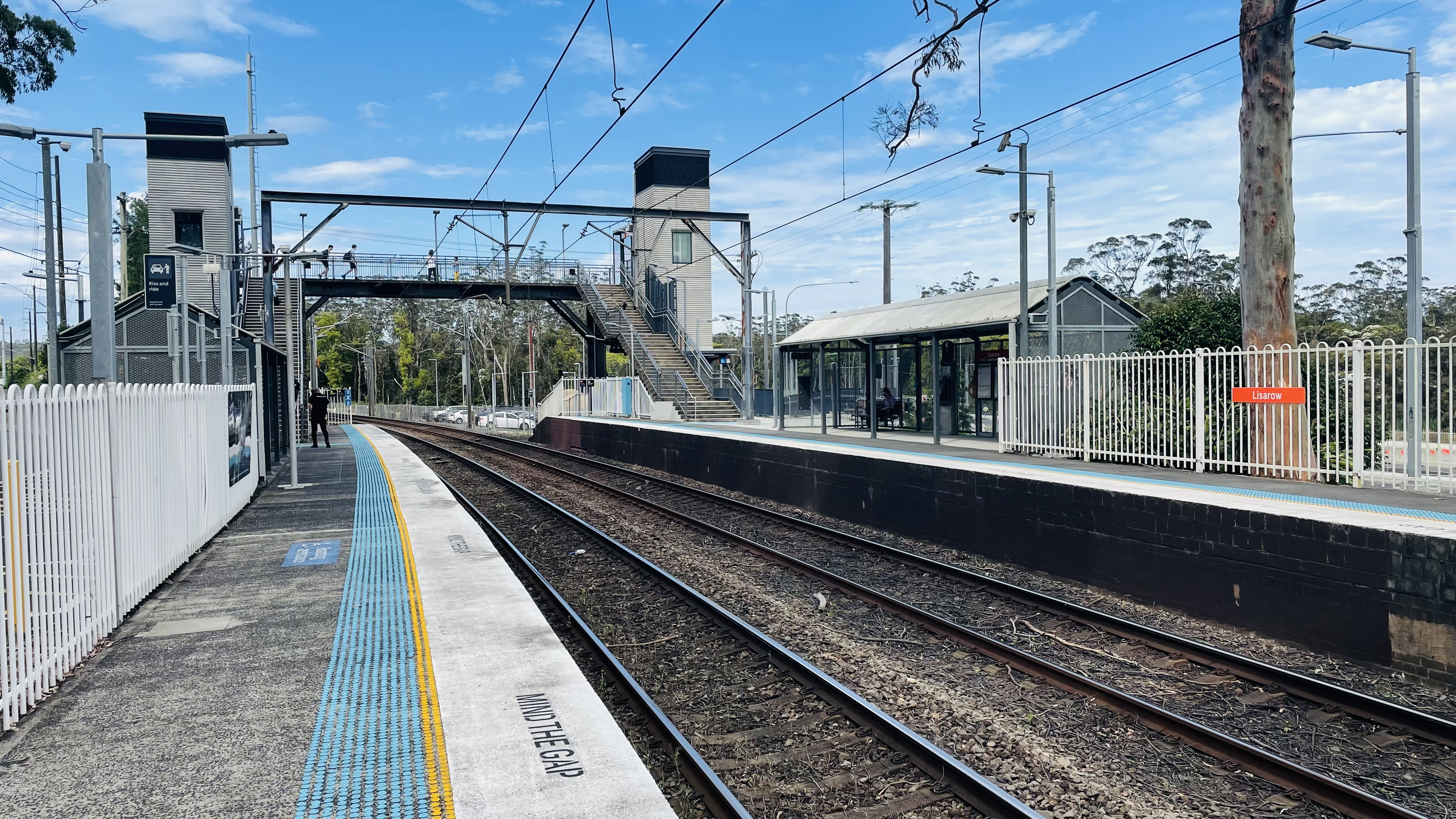
Lisarow

Ourimbah

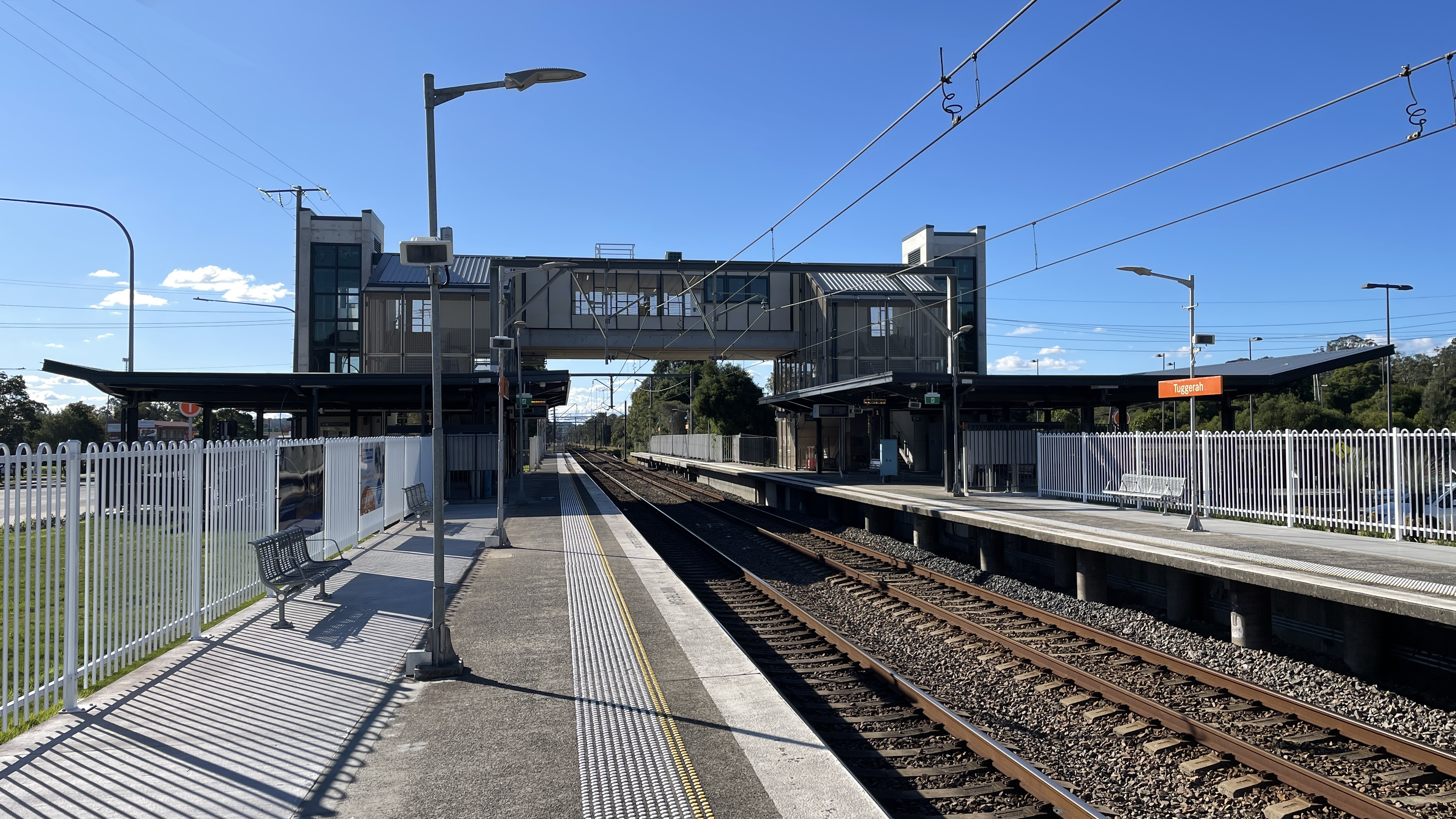
Tuggerah

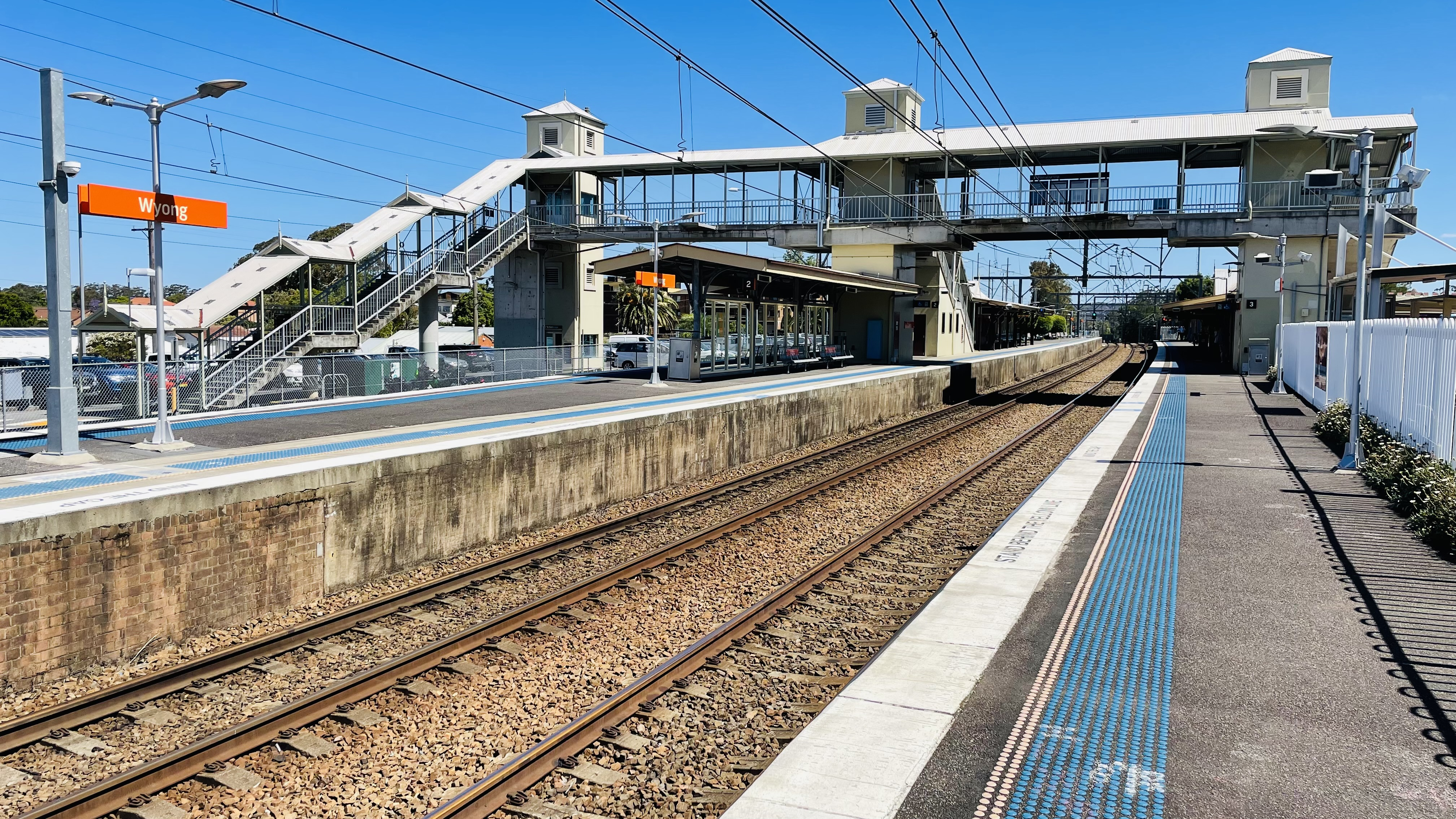
Wyong

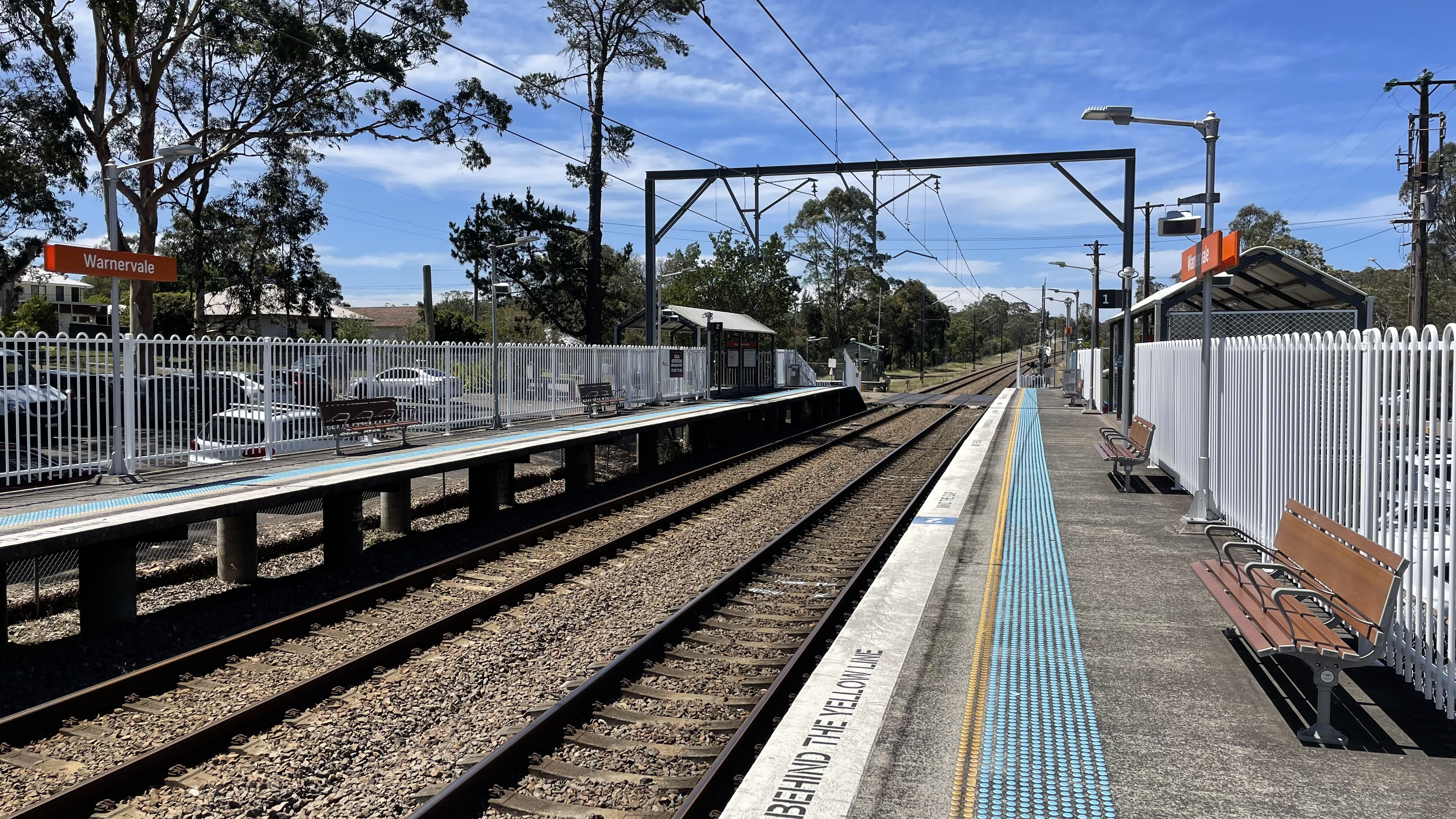
Warnervale

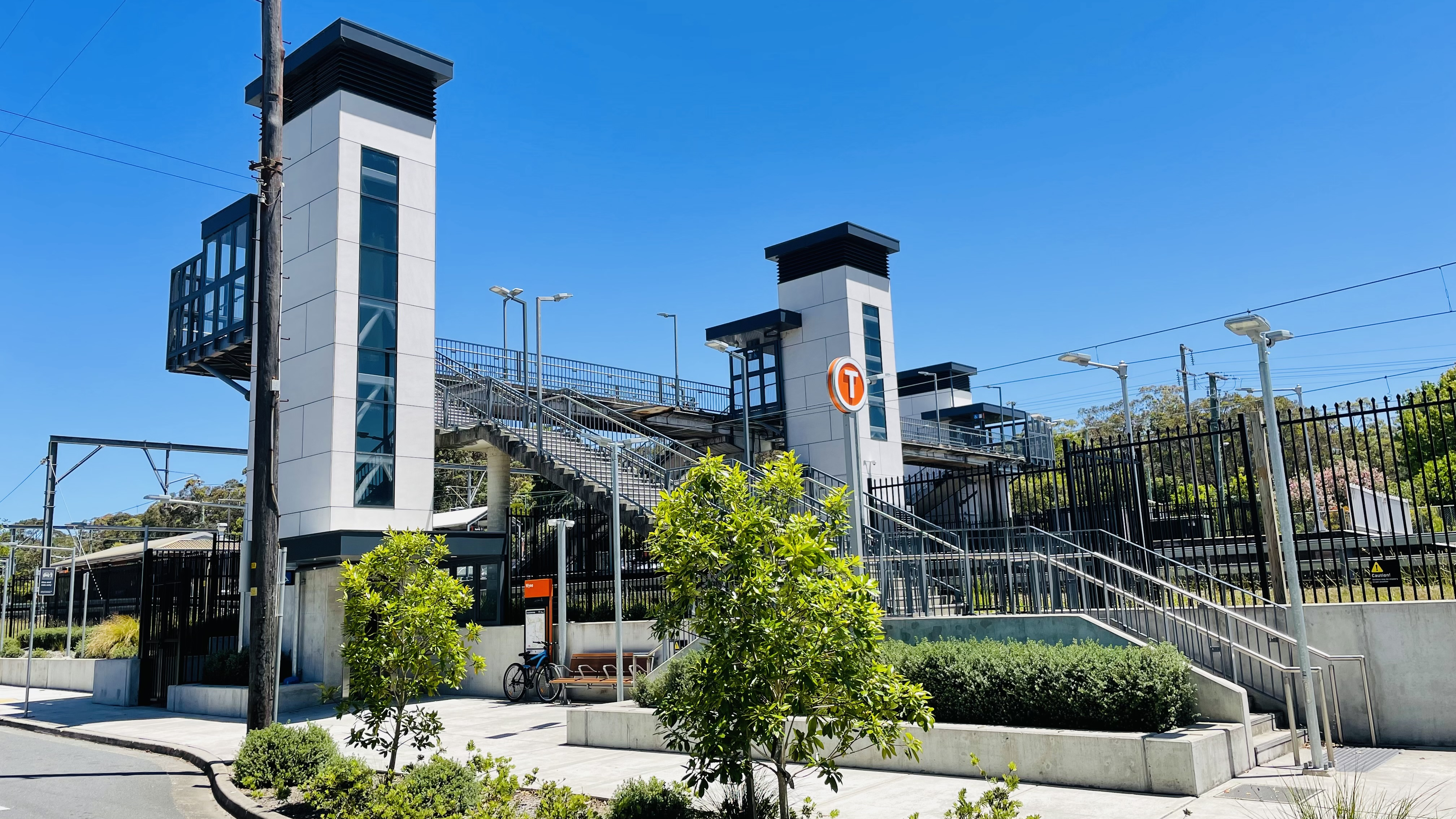
Wyee

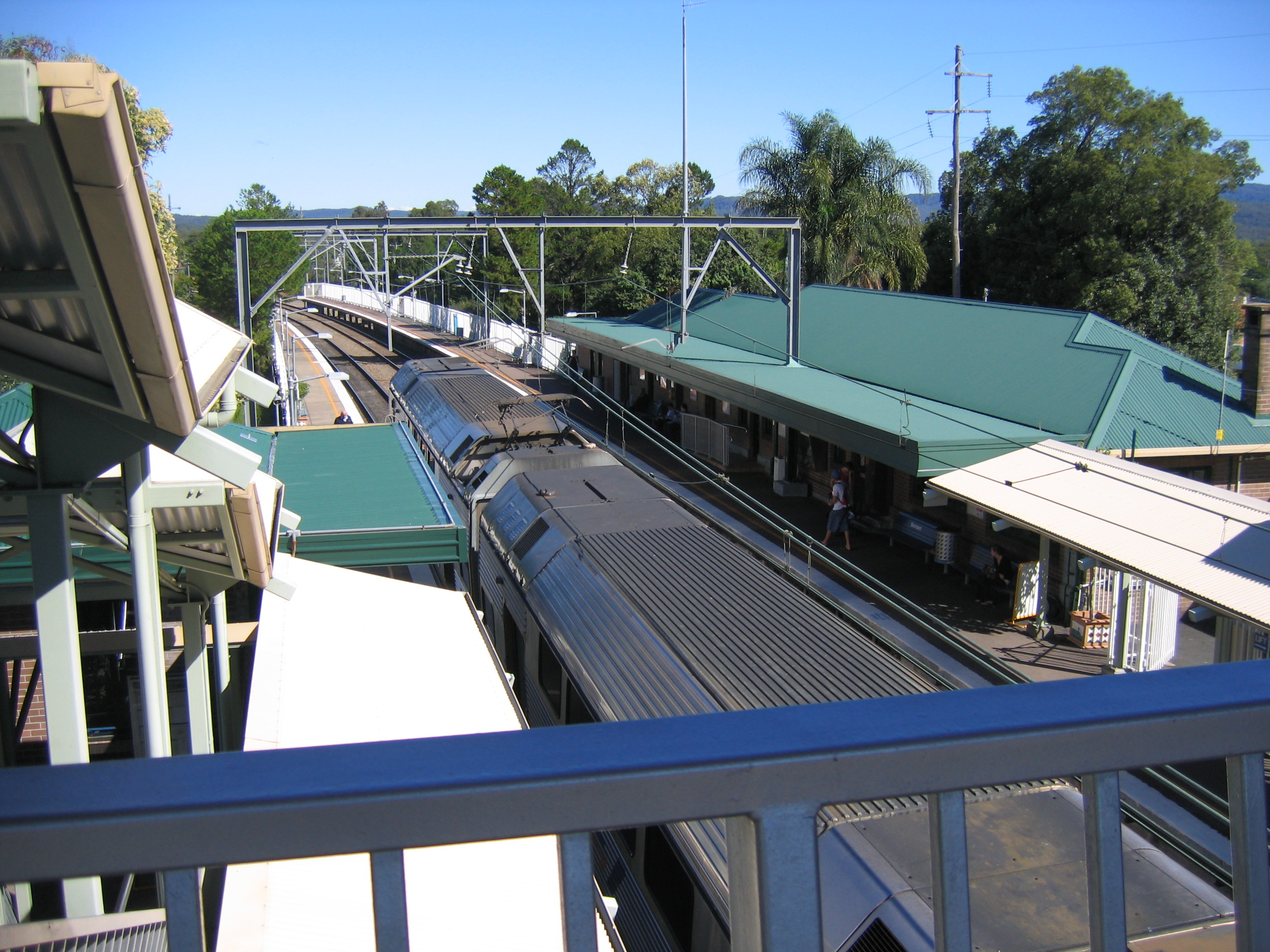
Morisset

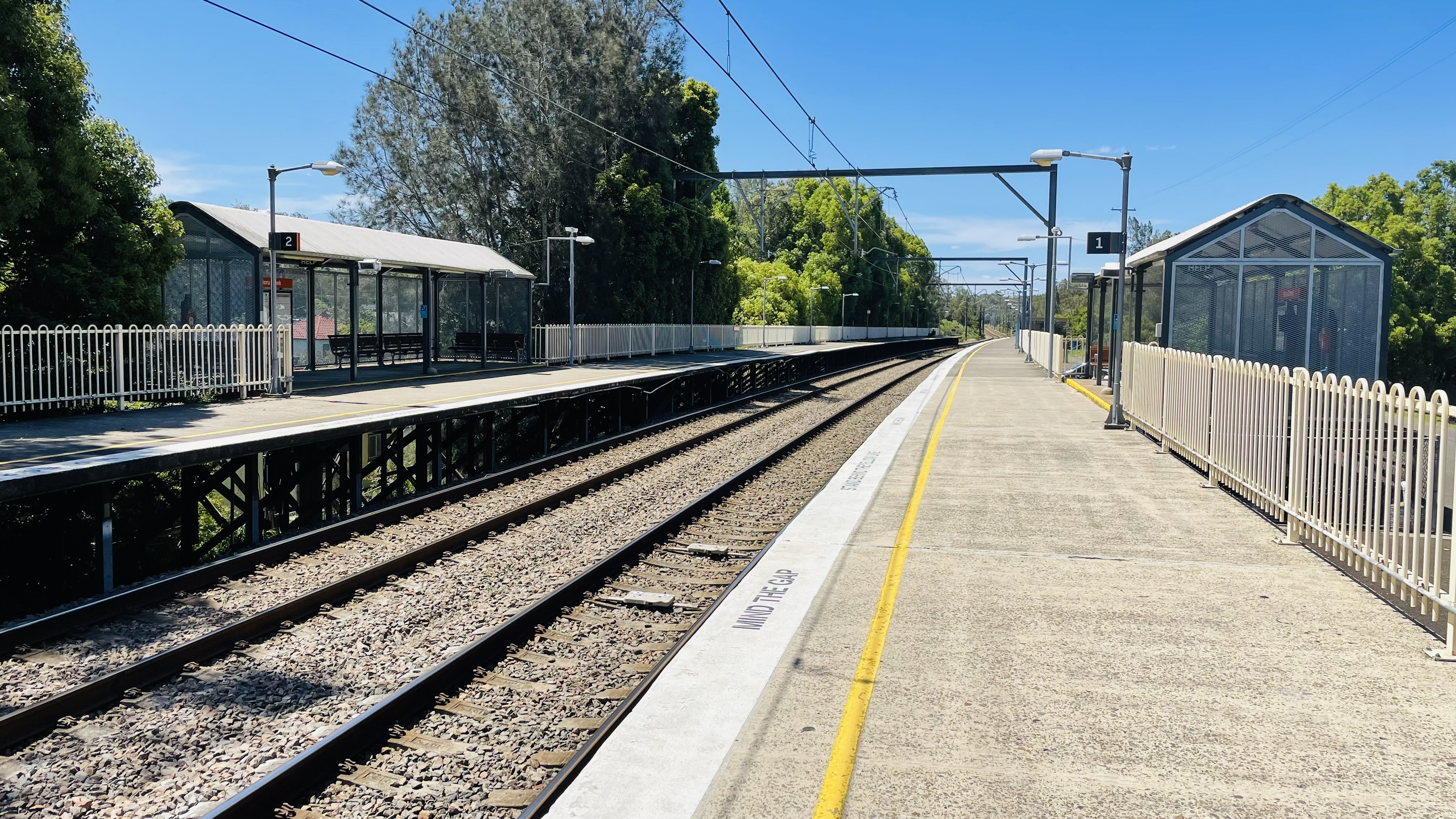
Dora Creek

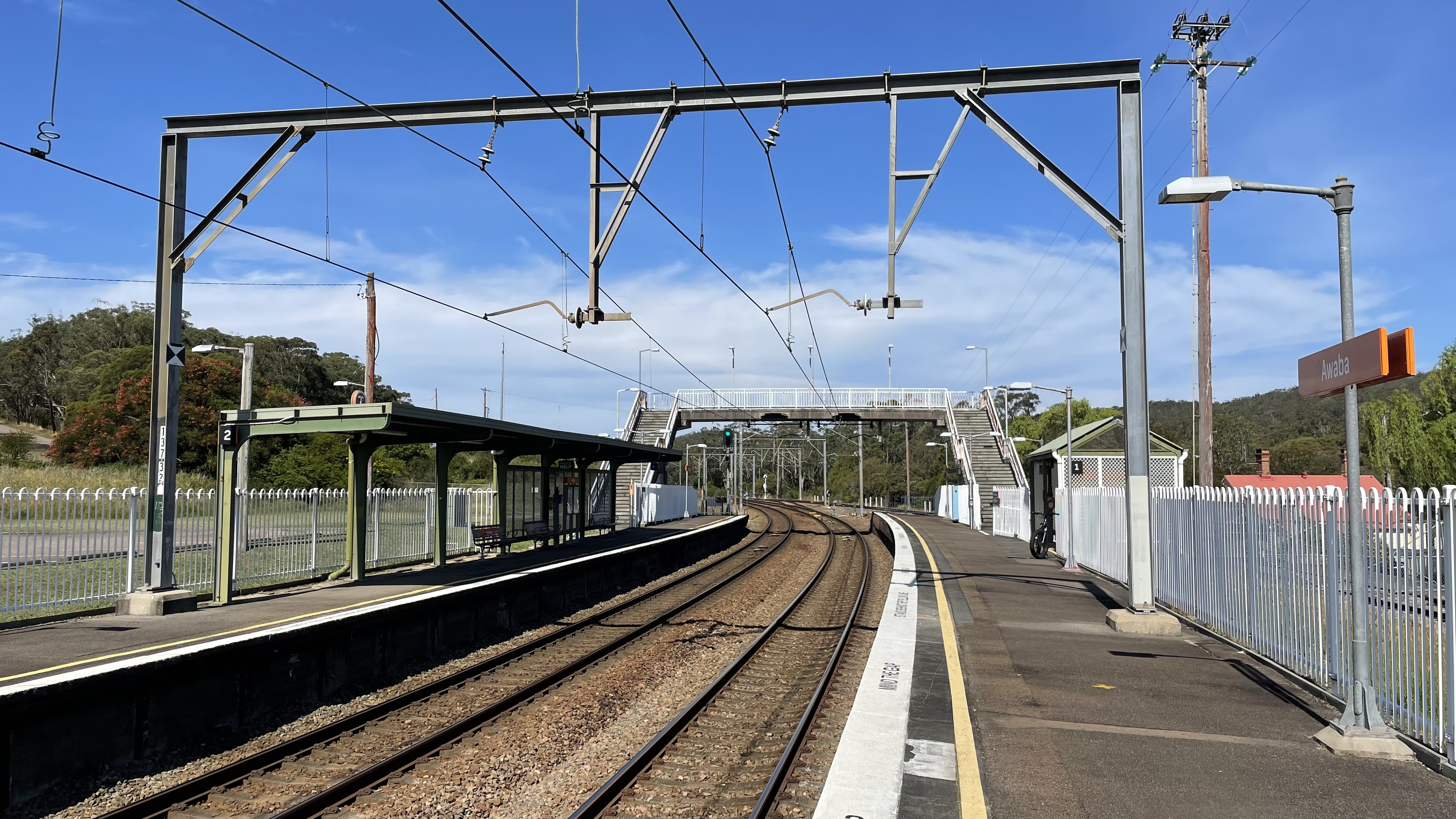
Awaba

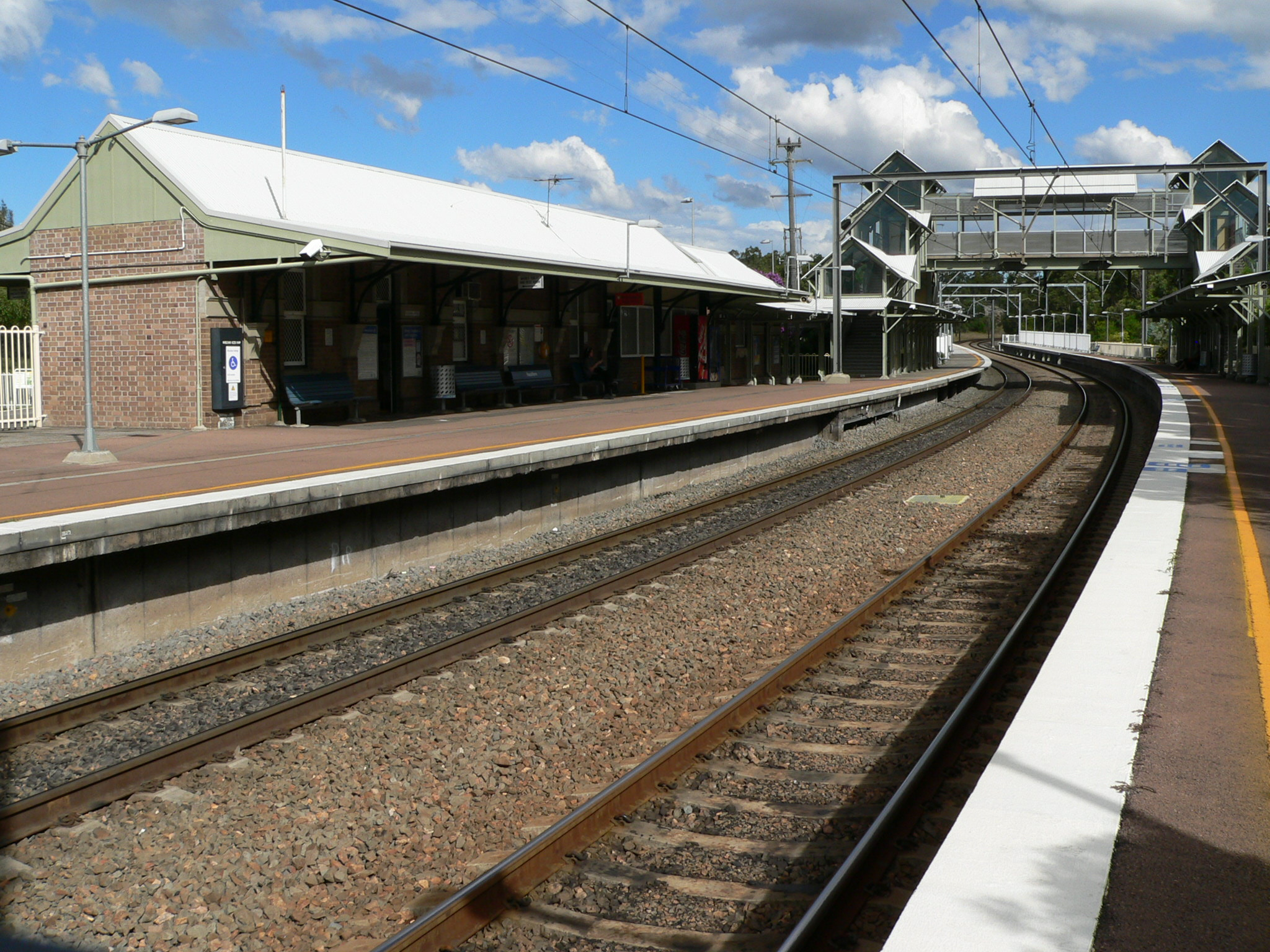
Fassifern

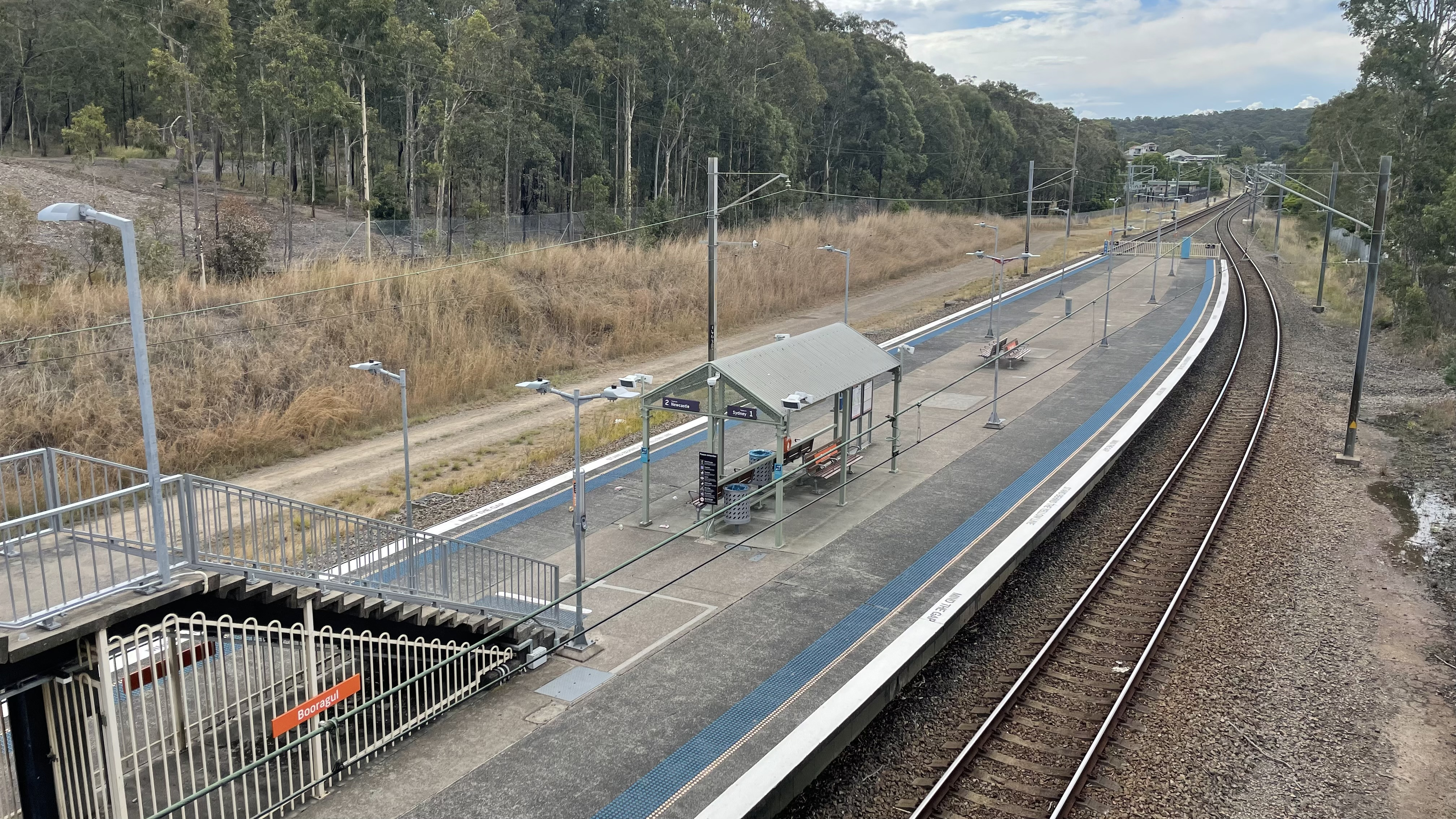
Booragul

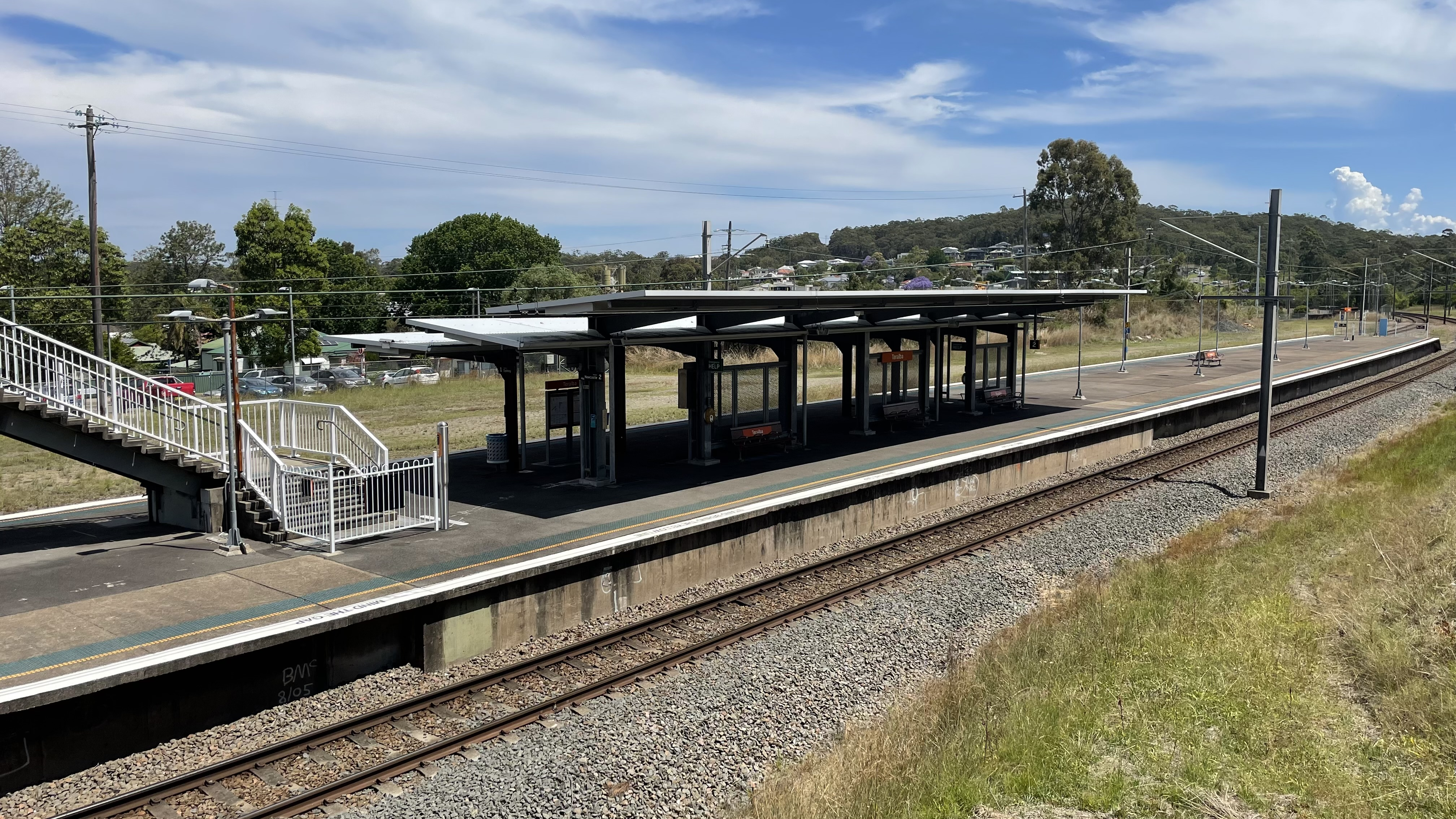
Teralba

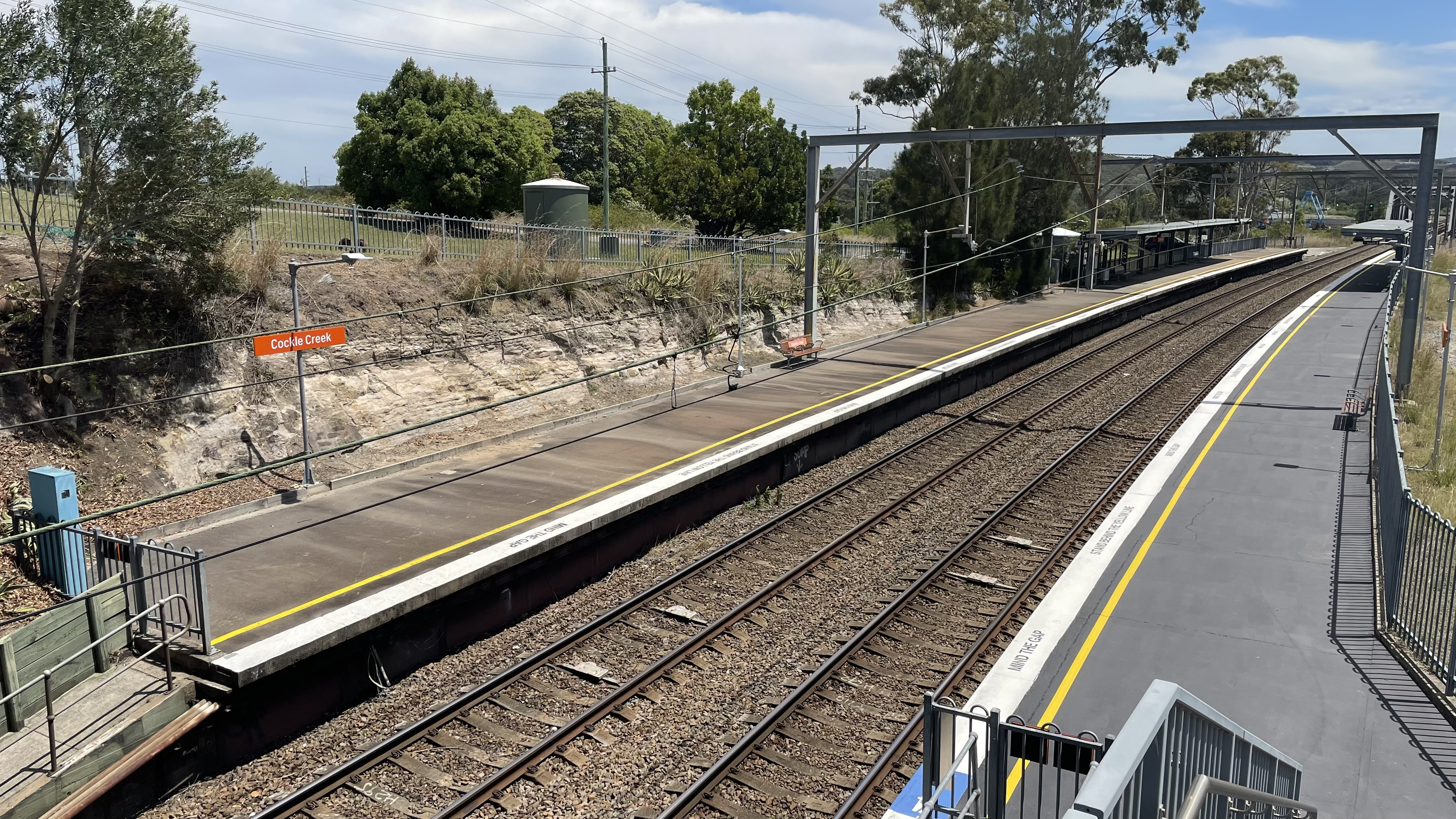
Cockle Creek

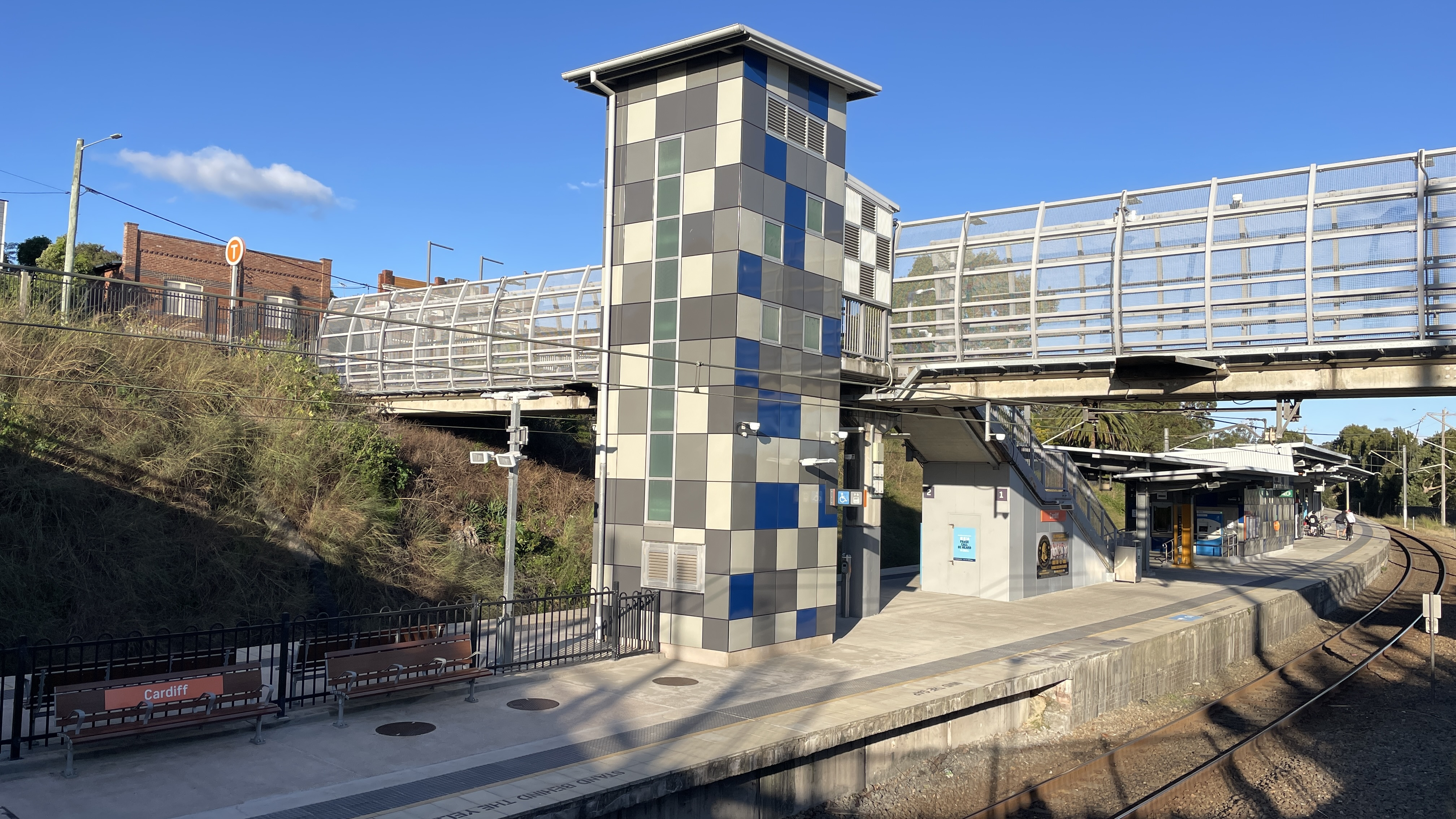
Cardiff

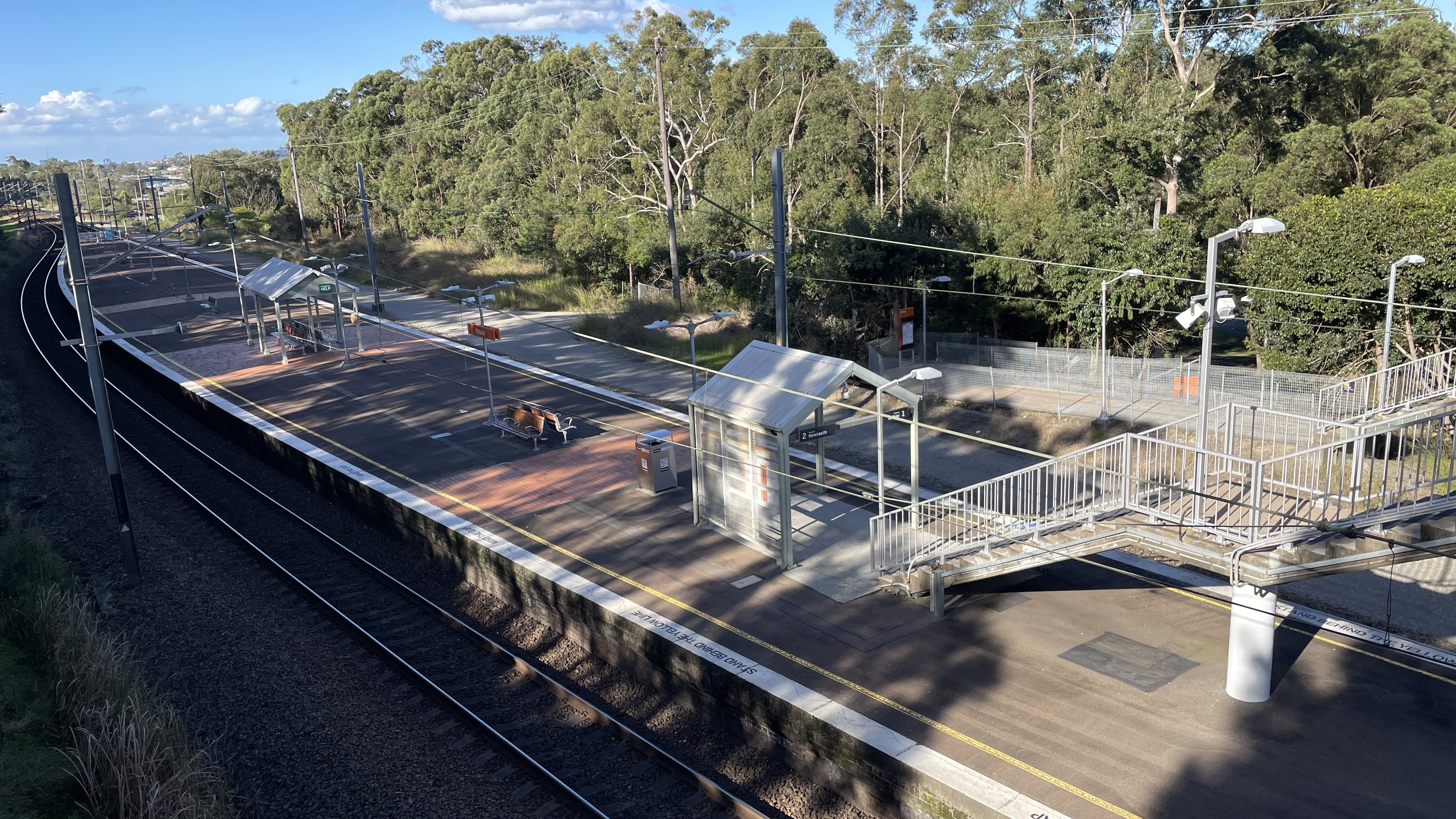
Kotara

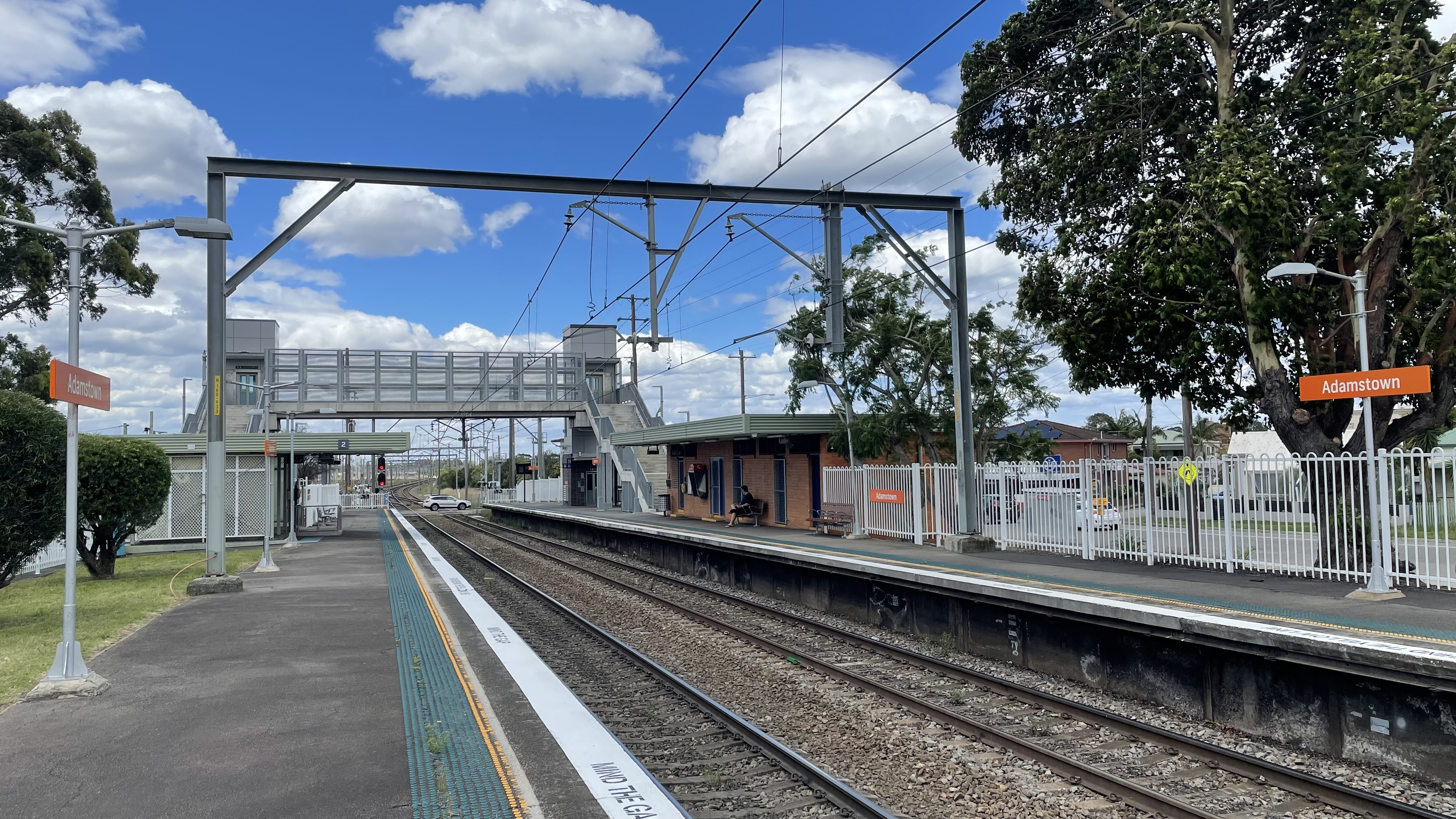
Adamstown

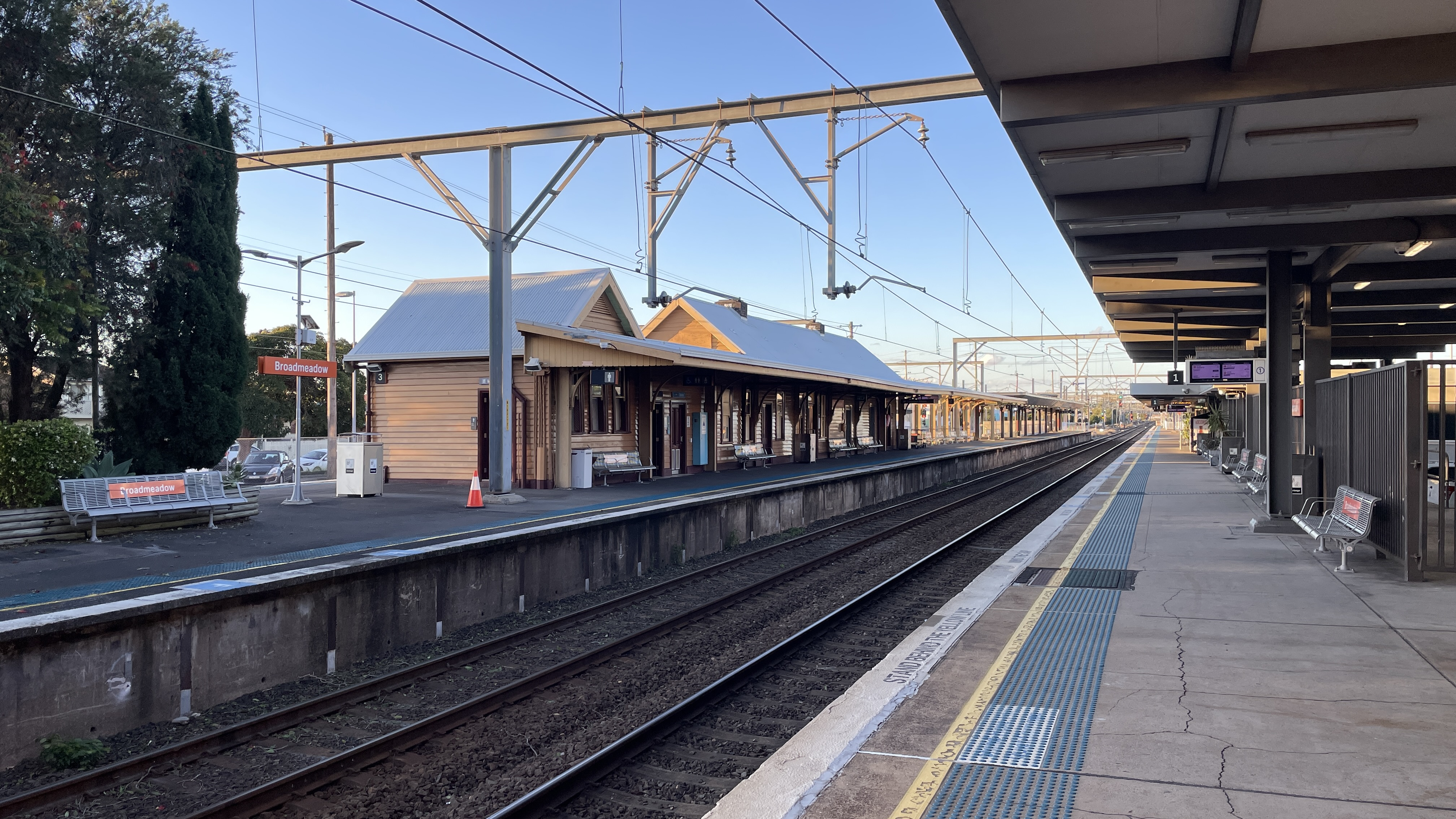
Broadmeadow

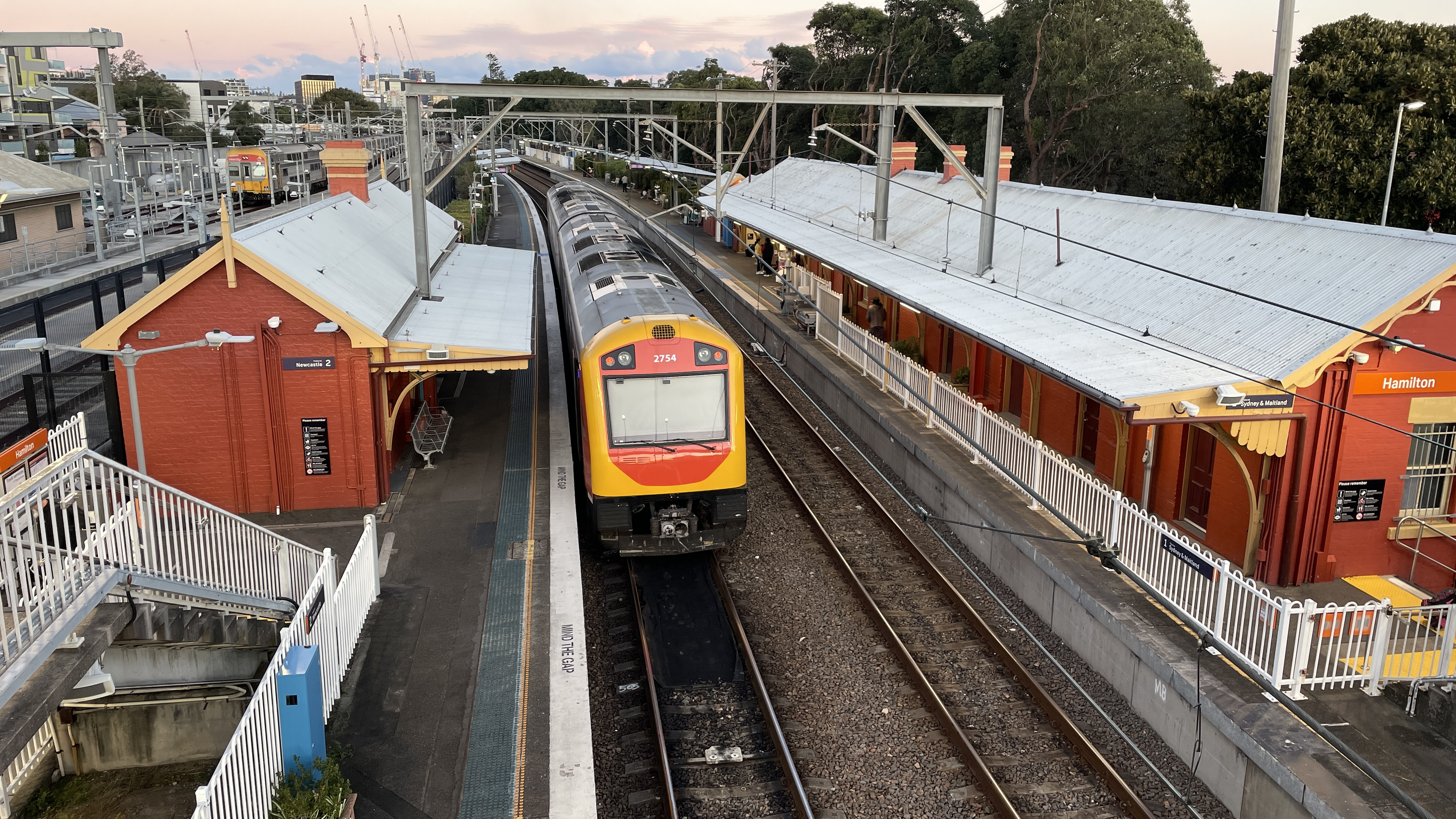
Hamilton

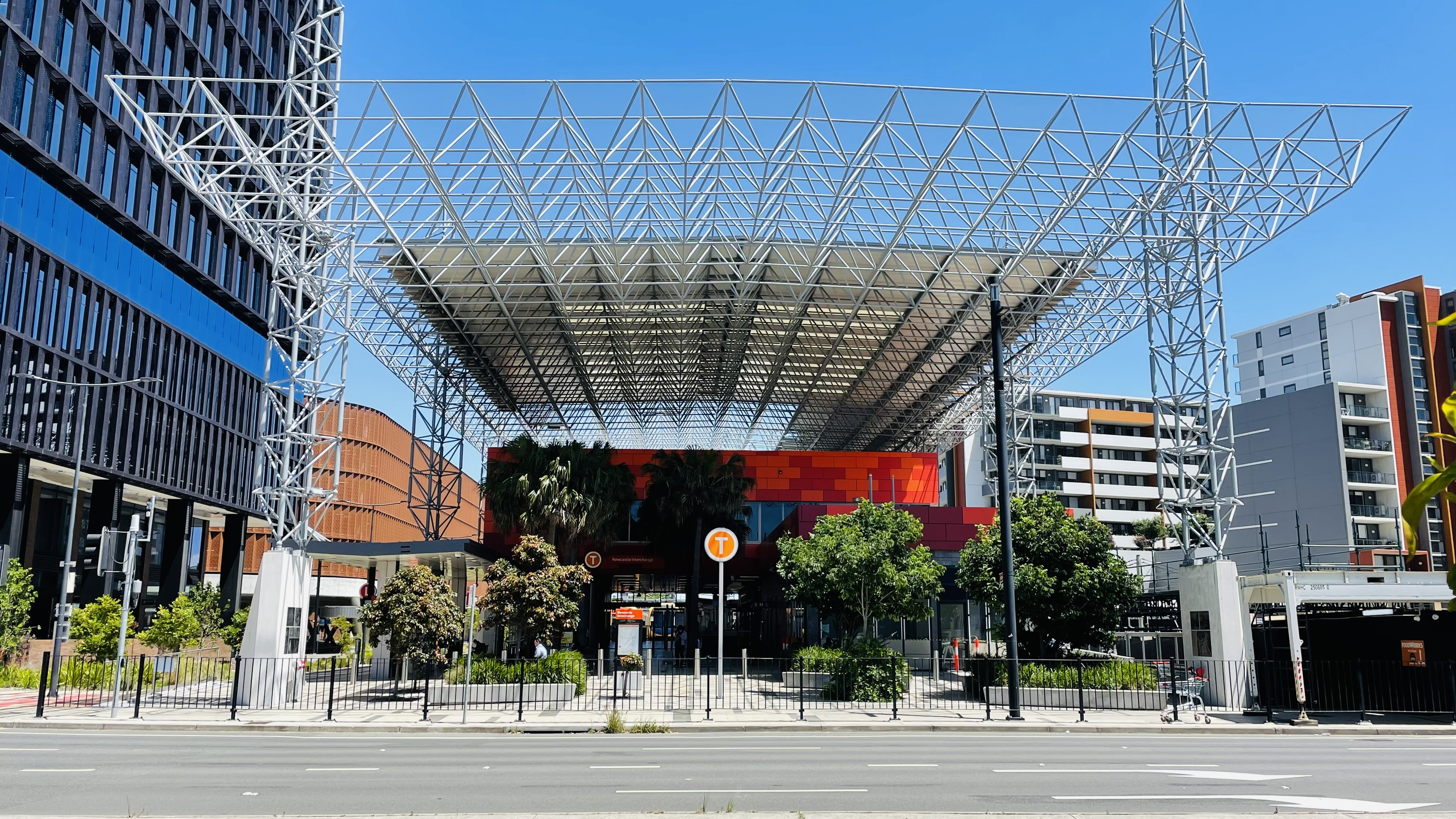
Newcastle Interchange

== Patronage ==
The following table shows the patronage of each line of the NSW TrainLink Intercity network for the year ending 30 June 2026, based on Opal tap on and tap off data.

2025–26 NSW TrainLink Intercity patronage by line
Blue Mountains Line	6,634,999
Central Coast & Newcastle Line	12,765,284
Hunter Line	839,041
South Coast Line	7,445,930
Southern Highlands Line	553,390

== See also ==
- Main Northern railway line – for details of history and construction.
- Woy Woy Tunnel
- Hawkesbury River railway bridge
