= Willi Willi Caves =

Caves in New South Wales, Australia

- Interactive map of Willi Willi Caves
- Location: Willi Willi, New South Wales, Australia
- Coordinates: 30°57′19″S 152°26′36″E
- Geology: Limestone

Willi Willi Caves
- Location: New South Wales
- Governing body: NSW National Parks & Wildlife Service

Willi Willi Caves Nature Reserve covers 8 ha and is located on the Mid North Coast of New South Wales on the lower slope of a ridge in the upper Macleay River catchment, 35 km to the west of Kempsey.

Willi Willi Caves Nature Reserve protects part of a limestone karst system.

The Australian Speleological Federation (ASF 1985) lists some 37 entrances in the reserve with the Willi Willi Bat Cave being the main feature. This cave is basically one large chamber with a number of branching tunnels connected to it and is used as a maternity cave by the common bent-wing bat.

== See also ==
- List of caves in Australia
