= Mermaids Cave =

Cave in New South Wales, Australia

Coordinates: 33°38′46″S 150°16′37″E

Mermaids Cave is an undercut sandstone cave located in the Blue Mountains of New South Wales, Australia. It was named in 1882 and was also known as Mermaid's Glen. It is accessible by a short walking trail from the Megalong Valley road.

A scene from Mad Max Beyond Thunderdome was filmed there.
